= List of genetic disorders =

The following is a list of genetic disorders and if known, type of mutation and for the chromosome involved. Although the parlance "disease-causing gene" is common, it is the occurrence of an abnormality in the parents that causes the impairment to develop within the child. There are over 6,000 known genetic disorders in humans.

== Most common ==
Human karyotype with annotated bands and sub-bands as used for the nomenclature of chromosome abnormalities. It shows dark and white regions as seen on G banding. Each row is vertically aligned at centromere level. It shows 22 homologous autosomal chromosome pairs, both the female (XX) and male (XY) versions of the two sex chromosomes, as well as the mitochondrial genome (at bottom left).

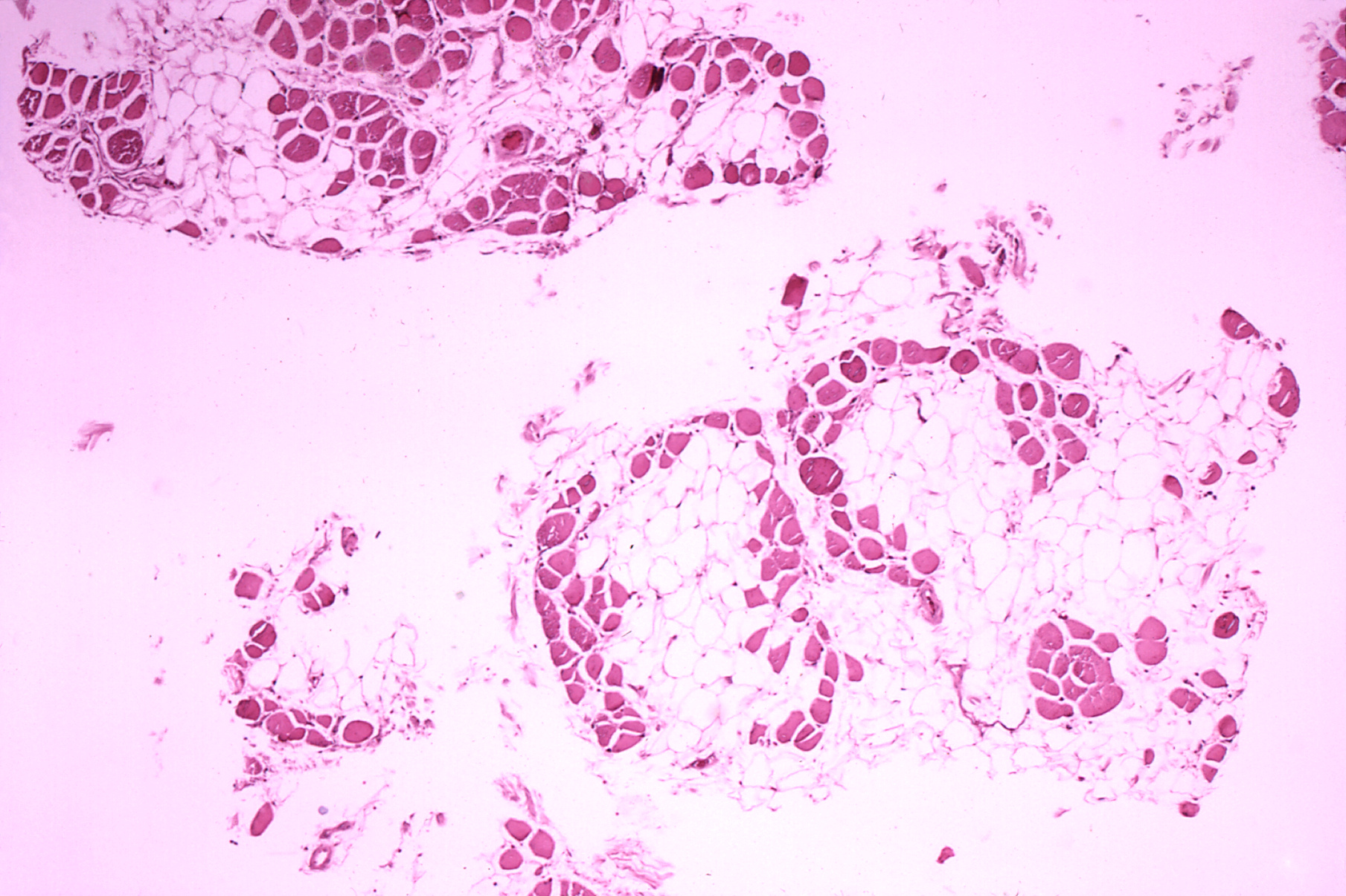
Duchenne muscular dystrophy

- P – Point mutation, or any insertion/deletion entirely inside one gene
- D – Deletion of a gene or genes
- Dup - Duplication of a gene or genes
- C – Whole chromosome extra, missing, or both (see chromosome abnormality)
- T – Trinucleotide repeat disorders: gene is extended in length

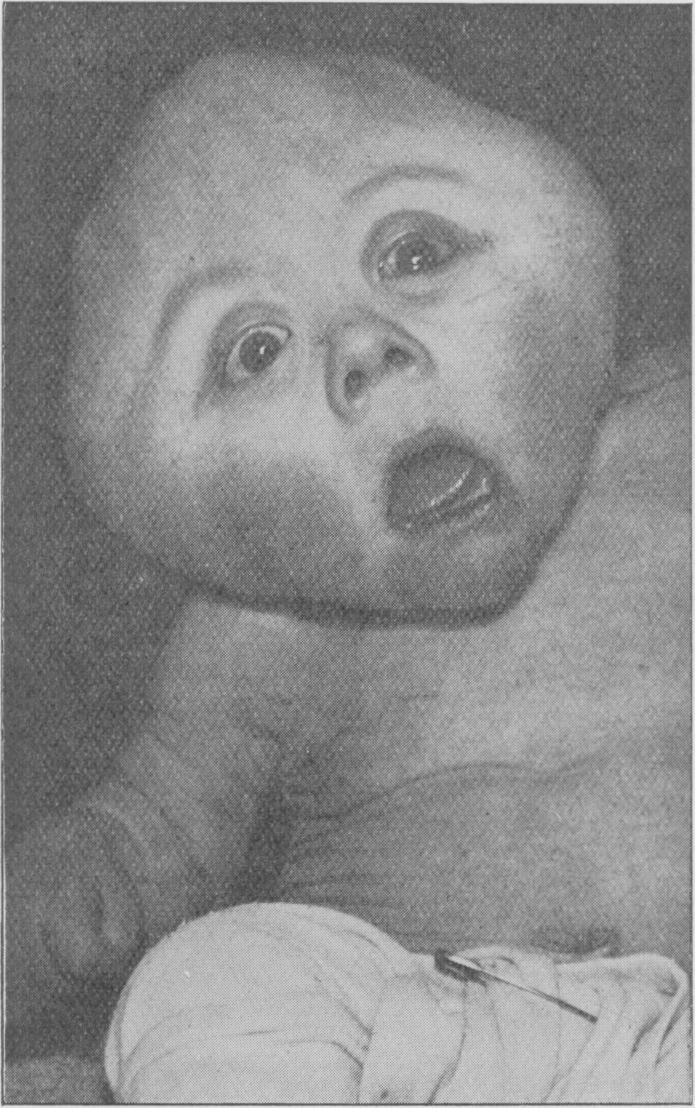
Craniosynostosis can be found in several disorders, like Carpenter Syndrome

| Disorder | Chromosome | Mutation |
|---|---|---|
| Angelman syndrome | 15q | DCP |
| Canavan disease | 17p | |
| Charcot–Marie–Tooth disease | 17p12 | Dup |
| Color blindness | X | P |
| Cri du chat syndrome | 5 | D |
| Cystic fibrosis | 7q | P |
| DiGeorge syndrome | 22q | D |
| Down syndrome | 21 | C |
| Duchenne muscular dystrophy | Xp | D |
| Familial hypercholesterolemia | 19 | P |
| Haemochromatosis type 1 | 6 | P |
| Hemophilia | X | P |
| Klinefelter syndrome | X | C |
| Neurofibromatosis | 17q/22q/? | |
| Phenylketonuria | 12q | P |
| Polycystic kidney disease | 16 (PKD1) or 4 (PKD2) | P |
| Prader–Willi syndrome | 15q | DCP |
| Scheuermann's disease | 1q21-q22 or 7q22 | |
| Sickle cell disease | 11p | P |
| Spinal muscular atrophy | 5q | DP |
| Tay–Sachs disease | 15q | P |
| Trisomy X | X | C |
| Turner syndrome | X | C |

== Full genetic disorders list ==
| Disorder | Chromosome or gene | Type | Reference | Prevalence |
|---|---|---|---|---|
| 1p36 deletion syndrome | 1 | D | | 1:5,000-10,000 |
| 1q21.1 deletion syndrome | 1q21.1 | D | | 1:6,500 |
| 2q37 deletion syndrome | 2q37 | D | | <1:1,000,000 |
| 5q deletion syndrome | 5q | D | | 1:20,000 |
| 5,10-methenyltetrahydrofolate synthetase deficiency | MTHFS | | | |
| 7p22.1 microduplication syndrome | 7p22.1 | | | <1:1,000,000 |
| 16p11.2 deletion syndrome | 16p11.2 | D | | 1:2,000-1:5,000 |
| 17q12 microdeletion syndrome | 17q12 | | | 1:14,000-62,500 |
| 17q12 microduplication syndrome | 17q12 | | | |
| 18p deletion syndrome | 18p | D | | 1:50,000 |
| 21-hydroxylase deficiency | 6p21.3 | recessive | | 1:15,000 |
| Alpha 1-antitrypsin deficiency | 14q32 | co-dominant, | | 1:2,500-5,000 |
| AAA syndrome (achalasia–addisonianism–alacrima syndrome) | AAAS | recessive | | 1:1,000,000 |
| Aarskog–Scott syndrome | FGD1 | X-linked recessive | | 1:25,000 |
| ABCD syndrome | EDNRB | recessive | | 1:18,000-20,000 |
| Absence deformity of leg-cataract syndrome | | | | |
| Aceruloplasminemia | CP (3p26.3) | recessive | | 1:2,000,000 |
| Acheiropodia | LMBR1 | recessive | | |
| Achondrogenesis type II | COL2A1 (12q13.11) | dominant | | 1:40,000-60,000 |
| Achondroplasia | FGFR3 (4p16.3) | dominant | | 1:27,500 |
| Acute intermittent porphyria | HMBS | dominant and recessive forms | | 1:500-50,000 |
| Adenylosuccinate lyase deficiency | ADSL | recessive | | |
| Adrenoleukodystrophy | ABCD1 (X) | recessive | | 1:17,000 |
| Alagille syndrome | JAG1, NOTCH2 | dominant | | 1:30,000-50,000 |
| ADULT syndrome | TP63 | dominant | | |
| Aicardi–Goutières syndrome | TREX1, RNASEH2A, RNASEH2B, RNASEH2C, SAMHD1, ADAR, IFIH1 | | | 1:19,500,000 |
| Albinism | | | | 1:18,000-20,000 |
| Alexander disease | GFAP | | | 1:15,600,000 |
| Alfi's syndrome | 9p | monosomy | | 1:50,000 |
| Alkaptonuria | HGD | | | 1:250,000-1,000,000 |
| Alport syndrome | 10q26.13 COL4A3, COL4A4, and COL4A5 | | | 1:5,000-10,000 |
| Alternating hemiplegia of childhood | ATP1A3 | | | 1:1,000,000 |
| Aortic arch anomaly - peculiar facies - intellectual disability | | dominant | | |
| Amish lethal microcephaly | SLC25A19 | recessive | | |
| Amyotrophic lateral sclerosis – Frontotemporal dementia | C9orf72, SOD1, FUS, TARDBP, CHCHD10, MAPT | | | 1:100,000 |
| Angel-shaped phalango-epiphyseal dysplasia | GDF5 | dominant | | |
| Alström syndrome | ALMS1 | | | 1:8,600,000 |
| Alzheimer's disease | PSEN1, PSEN2, APP, APOEε4 | | | 1:177 |
| Amelogenesis imperfecta | | | | 1:14,000 |
| Aminolevulinic acid dehydratase deficiency porphyria | ALAD | | | 1:780,000,000 |
| Androgen insensitivity syndrome | | | | 1:20,000-50,000 |
| Angelman syndrome | UBE3A | | | 1:12,000-20,000 |
| Aphalangy-syndactyly-microcephaly syndrome | | dominant | | |
| Apert syndrome | FGFR2 | | | 1:65,000-80,000 |
| Arthrogryposis–renal dysfunction–cholestasis syndrome | VPS33B | | | 1:78,000,000 |
| Arboleda-Tham Syndrome | KAT6A(8p11.21) | Dominant | | |
| Ataxia telangiectasia | ATM | | | 1:40,000-1,000,000 |
| Axenfeld syndrome | PITX2, FOXO1A, FOXC1, PAX6 | | | 1:200,000 |
| Bainbridge–Ropers syndrome | ASXL3 | de novo | | |
| Beare–Stevenson cutis gyrata syndrome | 10q26, FGFR2 | | | 1:390,000,000 |
| Beckwith–Wiedemann syndrome | IGF-2, CDKN1C, H19, KCNQ1OT1 | | | 1:15,000 |
| Benjamin syndrome | | | | 1:20,000,000 |
| biotinidase deficiency | BTD | | | 1:110,000,000 |
| Björnstad syndrome | BCS1L | | | 1:260,000,000 |
| Blepharophimosis intellectual disability syndromes | | | | |
| Bloom syndrome | 15q26.1 | | | 1:480,000 |
| Birt–Hogg–Dubé syndrome | 17 FLCN | | | 1:19,500,000 |
| Brody myopathy | ATP2A1 | | | 1:10,000,000 |
| Brunner syndrome | MAOA | | | 1:500,000,000 |
| CADASIL syndrome | NOTCH3 | P | | 1:156,000,000 |
| Cat eye syndrome | 22 | | | 1:74,000 |
| CATSHL syndrome | FGFR3 | dominant/recessive | | |
| CRASIL syndrome | HTRA1 | | | 1:156,000,000 |
| Chronic granulomatous disorder | | | | 1:200,000 |
| Campomelic dysplasia | X 17q24.3–q25.1 | C | | 1:40,000-200,000 |
| Camptodactyly-taurinuria syndrome | | dominant | | |
| Canavan disease | ASPA | | | 1:6,400-13,500 |
| Carpenter syndrome | RAB23 | | | 1:1,000,000 |
| CDKL5 deficiency disorder | CDKL5 | | | 1:40,000-60,000 |
| Central diabetes insipidus | AVP, PCSK1 | autosomal dominant, autosomal recessive, X-linked dominant | | 1:25,000 |
| Cerebral dysgenesis–neuropathy–ichthyosis–keratoderma syndrome (CEDNIK) | SNAP29 | | | <1:1,000,000 |
| Cleft palate short stature vertebral anomalies syndrome | | | | |
| Combined malonic and methylmalonic aciduria (CMAMMA) | ACSF3 | recessive | | 1:30,000 |
| Combined malonic and methylmalonic aciduria (CMAMMA) | MLYCD | recessive | | |
| Congenital muscular dystrophy-infantile cataract-hypogonadism syndrome | | recessive | | |
| Cystic fibrosis | CFTR (7q31.2) | D or S | | 1:100,000 |
| Charcot–Marie–Tooth disease | PMP22, MFN2 | | | 1:2,500 |
| CHARGE syndrome | CHD7 | | | 1:8,500-10,000 |
| Chédiak–Higashi syndrome | LYST | recessive | | 1:39,000,000 |
| Chondrodysplasia, Grebe type | GDF5 | autosomal recessive | | |
| Cleidocranial dysostosis | RUNX2 | | | 1:7,800 |
| Cockayne syndrome | ERCC6, ERCC8 | | | 1:2,600-3,900 |
| Coffin–Lowry syndrome | X RPS6KA3 | | | 1:40,000-50,000 |
| Cohen syndrome | COH1 | | | 1:7,800,000 |
| Collagenopathy, types II and XI | COL11A1, COL11A2, COL2A1 | | | |
| Congenital insensitivity to pain with anhidrosis (CIPA) | NTRK1 | | | |
| Congenital muscular dystrophy | multiple | dominant or recessive | | |
| Corneal dystrophy-perceptive deafness syndrome | SLC4A11 | autosomal recessive | | |
| Cornelia de Lange syndrome (CDLS) | HDAC8, SMC1A, NIPBL, SMA3, RAD21 | | | 1:10,000-30,000 |
| Cowden syndrome | PTEN | | | 1:200,000 |
| CPO deficiency (coproporphyria) | CPOX | | | |
| Cranio-lenticulo-sutural dysplasia | 14q13–q21 | | | |
| Cri du chat | 5p15.2 | D | | 1:37,000-50,000 |
| Crohn's disease | 16q12 | P | | |
| Crouzon syndrome | FGFR2, FGFR3 | | | 1.6:100,000 |
| Crouzonodermoskeletal syndrome (Crouzon syndrome with acanthosis nigricans) | FGFR3 | | | 1:1,000,000 |
| Currarino syndrome | HLXB9 | dominant | | 1:100,000 |
| Darier's disease | ATP2A2 | | | 1:30,000-100,000 |
| Dent's disease (Genetic hypercalciuria) | Xp11.22 CLCN5, OCRL | | | |
| Denys–Drash syndrome | WT1 | | | |
| De Grouchy syndrome | 18q | D | | |
| DHX30 syndrome | 3 | dominant | | |
| Dolichonychia | | | | |
| Down syndrome | 21 | C | | 1:1,000-1,100; 1:1,200 (U.S.) |
| Diaphanospondylodysostosis | BMPER, 7p14.3 | recessive | | <1:1,000,000 |
| DiGeorge syndrome | 22q11.2 | D | | 1:4,000 |
| Distal hereditary motor neuropathies, multiple types | HSPB8, HSPB1, HSPB3, GARS, REEP1, IGHMBP2, SLC5A7, DCTN1, TRPV4, SIGMAR1 | | | |
| Distal muscular dystrophy | Dysferlin, TIA1, GNE (gene), MYH7, Titin, MYOT, MATR3, unknown | Dominant or recessive | | |
| Duchenne muscular dystrophy | Dystrophin | X-linked recessive | | |
| Dravet syndrome | SCN1A, SCN2A | | | 1:20,000-40,000 |
| Ectrodactyly-polydactyly syndrome | | | | |
| Edwards syndrome | 18 | trisomy | | 1:5,000 |
| Ehlers–Danlos syndrome | COL1A1, COL1A2, COL3A1, COL5A1, COL5A2, TNXB, ADAMTS2, PLOD1, B4GALT7, DSE | dominant | | 1:5,000 |
| Emanuel syndrome | 11, 22 | partial trisomy | | |
| Emery–Dreifuss syndrome | EMD, LMNA, SYNE1, SYNE2, FHL1, TMEM43 | | | |
| Epidermolysis bullosa | KRT5, KRT14, DSP, PKP1, JUP, PLEC1, DST, EXPH5, TGM5, LAMA3, LAMB3, LAMC2, COL17A1, ITGA6, ITGA4, ITGA3, COL7A1, FERMT1 | dominant or recessive | | 11.08:1,000,000 |
| Erythropoietic protoporphyria | FECH | | | 1:75,000-200,000 |
| Fanconi anemia (FA) | FANCA, FANCB, FANCC, FANCD1, FANCD2, FANCE, FANCF, FANCG, FANCI, FANCJ, FANCL, FANCM, FANCN, FANCP, FANCS, RAD51C, XPF | | | 1:130,000 |
| Fabry disease | GLA (Xq22.1) | P | | 1:117,000-476,000 |
| Factor V Leiden thrombophilia | | | | |
| Fatal familial insomnia | PRNP | dominant | | |
| Familial adenomatous polyposis | APC | | | 1:10,000-15,000 |
| Familial dysautonomia | IKBKAP | | | |
| Familial Creutzfeld–Jakob disease | PRNP | dominant | | |
| Familial episodic pain syndrome | TRPA1, SCN10A, SCN11A | dominant | | |
| Familial thoracic aortic aneurysm and aortic dissection | FOXE3, SMAD2, LOX, MAT2A, ELN, HEY2, TGFB3, TGFBR1, TGFBR2, FBN1, ACTA2, MYLK, SMAD3, PRKG1, MFAP5, TGFB2, SMAD4, MYH11 | dominant | | |
| Feingold syndrome | MYCN | | | |
| FG syndrome | MED12 | | | |
| FBXW7 neurodevelopmental syndrome | FBXW7 | | | |
| Fibular aplasia-ectrodactyly syndrome | | dominant | | |
| Fine-Lubinsky syndrome | MAF | recessive | | |
| Fragile X syndrome | FMR1 | T | | 1:4,000 males 1:8,000 females |
| Friedreich's ataxia | FXN | T | | 1:50,000 (U.S.) |
| G6PD deficiency | | X-linked recessive | | |
| Galactosemia | GALT, GALK1, GALE | | | |
| Gaucher disease | GBA (1) | | | 1:20,000 |
| Gerstmann–Sträussler–Scheinker syndrome | PRNP | dominant | | |
| Gillespie syndrome | PAX6 | | | |
| Glutaric aciduria, type I and type 2 | GCDH, ETFA, ETFB, ETFDH | recessive | | |
| Gollop-Wolfgang complex | | | | 1–9:1,000,000 |
| GRACILE syndrome | BCS1L | | | |
| GRIN2B-related neurodevelopmental disorder | GRIN2B | | | |
| Griscelli syndrome | MYO5A, RAB27A, MLPH | | | |
| Gustavson syndrome | | | | |
| Hailey–Hailey disease | ATP2C1 (3) | | | |
| Harlequin type ichthyosis | ABCA12 | | | |
| Hemochromatosis type 1 | HFE (chromosome 6) | recessive | | 1:200 (Northern Europe), 1:300 (Northern America) |
| Hemochromatosis type 2A | HJV (or HFE2A) (chromosome 1) | recessive | | |
| Hemochromatosis type 2B | HAMP (or HFE2B) (chromosome 19) | recessive | | |
| Haemochromatosis type 3 | TFR2 (or HFE3) (chromosome 7) | recessive | | |
| Hemochromatosis type 4 | SLC40A1 (or HFE4) (chromosome 2) | dominant | | |
| Hemochromatosis type 5 | FTH1 (chromosome 11) | dominant | | |
| Hemophilia | FVIII | | | 1:7,500 males (hemophilia A) 1:40,000 males (hemophilia B) |
| Hepatoerythropoietic porphyria | UROD | | | |
| Hereditary coproporphyria | 3q12 | P | | |
| Hereditary hemorrhagic telangiectasia (Osler–Weber–Rendu syndrome) | ENG, ACVRL1, MADH4 | | | 1:5,000 |
| Hereditary inclusion body myopathy | GNE, MYHC2A, VCP, HNRPA2B1, HNRNPA1 | | | |
| Hereditary multiple exostoses | EXT1, EXT2, EXT3 | | | 1:50,000 |
| Hereditary spastic paraplegia (infantile-onset ascending hereditary spastic paralysis) | AP4M1, AP4S1, AP4B1, AP4E1 | autosomal dominant, autosomal recessive or X-linked recessive | | 2-6:100,000 |
| Hermansky–Pudlak syndrome | HPS1, HPS3, HPS4, HPS5, HPS6, HPS7, AP3B1 | | | 1:500,000 |
| Hereditary neuropathy with liability to pressure palsies (HNPP) | PMP22 | | | |
| Heterotaxy | NODAL, NKX2-5, ZIC3, CCDC11, CFC1, SESN1 | | | |
| Homocystinuria | CBS (gene) | recessive | | |
| Huntington's disease | chromosome 4 HTT gene | autosomal dominant | | 1:10,000 in US |
| Hunter syndrome | IDS | | | 1:100,000-150,000 males |
| Hurler syndrome | IDUA | | | 1:100,000 |
| Hutchinson–Gilford progeria syndrome | LMNA | | | 1:18,000,000 |
| Hyperlysinemia | AASS | recessive | | |
| Hyperoxaluria, primary | AGXT, GRHPR, DHDPSL | | | |
| Hyperphenylalaninemia | 12q | | | |
| Hypoalphalipoproteinemia (Tangier disease) | ABCA1 | | | |
| Hypochondrogenesis | COL2A1 | | | |
| Hypochondroplasia | FGFR3 (4p16.3) | | | |
| Ichthyosis-intellectual disability-dwarfism-renal impairment | | | | |
| Immunodeficiency–centromeric instability–facial anomalies syndrome (ICF syndrome) | 20q11.2 | | | |
| Incontinentia pigmenti | IKBKG (Xq28) | P | | |
| Infantile cerebral and cerebellar atrophy with postnatal progressive microcephaly | MED17 | recessive | | |
| Ischiopatellar dysplasia | TBX4 | dominant | | |
| Isodicentric 15 | 15q11–14 | Inv dup | | 1:30,000 |
| IQSEC2-related disorder | IQSEC2 | X-linked recessive | | <1:1,000,000 |
| PRICKLE1-related progressive myoclonus epilepsy with ataxia | PRICKLE1 | dominant or recessive | | |
| Jackson–Weiss syndrome | FGFR2 | | | |
| Jacobsen syndrome | 11 | | | 1:100,000 |
| Joubert syndrome | INPP5E, TMEM216, AHI1, NPHP1, CEP290, TMEM67, RPGRIP1L, ARL13B, CC2D2A, OFD1, TMEM138, TCTN3, ZNF423, AMRC9 | | | |
| Juvenile-onset dystonia | ACTB, IMPDH2 | dominant | | |
| Juvenile primary lateral sclerosis (JPLS) | ALS2 | | | |
| Keloid disorder | | | | |
| KIF1A-Associated neurological disorder | KIF1A (2q37.3) | Dominant negative | | |
| Kleefstra syndrome | 9q34 | D | | |
| Kniest dysplasia | COL2A1 | | | 1:1,000,000 |
| Kosaki overgrowth syndrome | PDGFRB | | | |
| Krabbe disease | GALC | | | 1:100,000 |
| Kufor–Rakeb syndrome | ATP13A2 | | | |
| LCAT deficiency | LCAT | | | |
| Lesch–Nyhan syndrome | HPRT (X) | | | 1:380,000 |
| Li–Fraumeni syndrome | TP53 | | | |
| Limb-Girdle Muscular Dystrophy | Multiple | dominant or recessive | | 1:14,500-123,000 |
| Lynch syndrome | MSH2, MLH1, MSH6, PMS2, PMS1, TGFBR2, MLH3 | | | 1:279 |
| Lipoprotein lipase deficiency | | recessive | | 1:1,000,000 |
| Malignant hyperthermia | RYR1 (19q13.2) | dominant | | 1:5,000-100,000 |
| Maple syrup urine disease | BCKDHA, BCKDHB, DBT, DLD | recessive | | |
| Marfan syndrome | 15q | dominant | | 1:5,000-10,000 |
| Maroteaux–Lamy syndrome | ARSB | recessive | | 1:43,261-1,505,160 |
| McCune–Albright syndrome | 20 q13.2–13.3 | | | 1:100,000-1,000,000 |
| McLeod syndrome | XK (X) | | | 0.5-1:100,000 |
| MEDNIK syndrome | AP1S1 | D | | |
| Mediterranean fever, familial | MEFV | | | |
| Menkes disease | ATP7A (Xq21.1) | | | 1:100,000-250,000 |
| Methemoglobinemia | | | | |
| Methylmalonic acidemia | MMAA, MMAB, MMACHC, MMADHC, LMBRD1, MUT | recessive | | 1:48,000 |
| Micro syndrome | RAB3GAP (2q21.3) | | | |
| Microcephaly | ASPM (1q31) | P | | |
| Miller-Dieker syndrome | 17p13.3 | D | | 1:100,000 |
| Morquio syndrome | GALNS, GLB1 | | | 1:200,000-300,000 |
| Mowat–Wilson syndrome | ZEB2 (2) | | | |
| Muenke syndrome | FGFR3 | | | 1:30,000 |
| Multiple endocrine neoplasia type 1 (Wermer's syndrome) | MEN1 | dominant | | |
| Multiple endocrine neoplasia type 2 | RET | dominant | | |
| Muscular dystrophy | multiple | AR, AD, X-linked | | |
| Muscular dystrophy, Duchenne and Becker type | | | | |
| Myostatin-related muscle hypertrophy | MSTN | | | |
| Myotonic dystrophy | DMPK, CNBP | dominant or T | | 1:8,000 |
| Natowicz syndrome | HYAL1 | | | <1:1,000,000 |
| Nephrogenic diabetes insipidus | AVPR2, AQP2 | autosomal dominant, autosomal recessive, X-linked recessive | | 1:25,000 |
| Neurofibromatosis type I | 17q11.2 | | | |
| Neurofibromatosis type II | NF2 (22q12.2) | | | |
| Niemann–Pick disease | SMPD1, NPA, NPB, NPC1, NPC2 | | | 1:250,000 (types A and B) 1:150,000 (type C) |
| Nonketotic hyperglycinemia | GLDC, AMT, GCSH | recessive | | 1:60,000 |
| Nonsyndromic deafness | | | | |
| Noonan syndrome | PTPN11, KRAS, SOS1, RAF1, NRAS, HRAS, BRAF, SHOC2, MAP2K1, MAP2K2, CBL | dominant | | 1:1,000 |
| Norman–Roberts syndrome | RELN | recessive | | |
| Ogden syndrome | X | P | | |
| Omenn syndrome | RAG1, RAG2 | recessive | | |
| Osteogenesis imperfecta | COL1A1, COL1A2, IFITM5 | dominant | | 1:15,000-20,000 |
| Ostravik-Lindemann-Solberg syndrome | 2p15 | autosomal recessive | | |
| Pantothenate kinase-associated neurodegeneration | PANK2 (20p13–p12.3) | recessive | | 1-3:1,000,000 |
| Patau syndrome (Trisomy 13) | 13 | trisomy | | |
| PCC deficiency (propionic acidemia) | PC | recessive | | 1:250,000 |
| Porphyria cutanea tarda (PCT) | UROD | dominant | | 1:10,000 |
| Pendred syndrome | PDS (7) | recessive | | |
| Peutz–Jeghers syndrome | STK11 | dominant | | 1:25,000-300,000 |
| Pfeiffer syndrome | FGFR1, FGFR2 | dominant | | 1:100,000 |
| Phelan-McDermid syndrome | 22q13 | D | | |
| Phenylketonuria | PAH | recessive | | 1:12,000 |
| Pipecolic acidemia | AASDHPPT | recessive | | |
| Pitt–Hopkins syndrome | TCF4 (18) | dominant, de novo | | 1:11,000-41,000 |
| Polycystic kidney disease | PKD1 (16) or PKD2 (4) | P | | |
| Polyendocrine metabolic ovarian syndrome (PMOS) | | | | |
| Porphyria | | | | 1-100:50,000 |
| Prader–Willi syndrome | 15 | paternal imprinting | | 1:10,000-30,000 |
| Primary ciliary dyskinesia (PCD) | DNAI1, DNAH5, TXNDC3, DNAH11, DNAI2, KTU, RSPH4A, RSPH9, LRRC50 | recessive | | 1:32,000 |
| Primary pulmonary hypertension | | | | |
| Protein C deficiency | PROC | dominant | | 1:20,000 |
| Protein S deficiency | PROS1 | dominant | | |
| Proximal 18q deletion syndrome | 18q | D | | |
| Pseudo-Gaucher disease | | | | |
| Pseudoxanthoma elasticum | ABCC6 | recessive | | 1:25,000 |
| Retinitis pigmentosa | RP1, RP2, RPGR, PRPH2, IMPDH1, PRPF31, CRB1, PRPF8, TULP1, CA4, HPRPF3, ABCA4, EYS, CERKL, FSCN2, TOPORS, SNRNP200, PRCD, NR2E3, MERTK, USH2A, PROM1, KLHL7, CNGB1, TTC8, ARL6, DHDDS, BEST1, LRAT, SPARA7, CRX | dominant or recessive | | 1:4,000 |
| Rett syndrome | MECP2 | dominant, often de novo | | 1:8,500 females |
| Roberts syndrome | ESCO2 | recessive | | |
| Rubinstein–Taybi syndrome (RSTS) | CREBBP | dominant | | 1:125,000-300,000 |
| Sandhoff disease | HEXB | recessive | | |
| Sanfilippo syndrome | SGSH, NAGLU, HGSNAT, GNS | | | 1:70,000 |
| Scheuermann's disease | 1q21-q22 or 7q22 | autosomal dominant | | 1:45 |
| Schwartz–Jampel syndrome | HSPG2 | recessive | | |
| Shprintzen–Goldberg syndrome | FBN1 | dominant | | |
| Sickle cell anemia | 11p15 | P | | |
| Siderius X-linked intellectual disability syndrome | PHF8 | X-Linked Recessive | | |
| Sideroblastic anemia | ABCB7, SLC25A38, GLRX5 | recessive | | |
| Sjogren-Larsson syndrome | ALDH3A2 | Autosomal-recessive | , , | |
| Skin fragility-woolly hair-palmoplantar keratoderma syndrome | DSP | | | |
| Sly syndrome | GUSB | recessive | | 1:250,000 |
| Smith–Lemli–Opitz syndrome | DHCR7 | recessive | | 1:20,000-60,000 |
| Smith–Magenis syndrome | 17p11.2 | dominant | | 1:15,000-25,000 |
| Snyder–Robinson syndrome | Xp21.3-p22.12 | recessive | | <1:1,000,000 |
| Sphingosine phosphate lyase insufficiency syndrome | 10q22.1 | Autosomal-recessive | | <1:6,000,000 |
| Spinal muscular atrophy | 5q | | | 1:10,000 |
| Spinocerebellar ataxia (types 1–29) | ATXN1, ATXN2, ATXN3, PLEKHG4, SPTBN2, CACNA1A, ATXN7, ATXN8OS, ATXN10, TTBK2, PPP2R2B, KCNC3, PRKCG, ITPR1, TBP, KCND3, FGF14 | dominant, recessive or T | | |
| Split hand split foot-nystagmus syndrome | | dominant | | |
| Spondyloepiphyseal dysplasia congenita (SED) | COL2A1 | dominant | | |
| SSB syndrome (SADDAN) | FGFR3 | dominant | | |
| Stargardt disease (macular degeneration) | ABCA4, CNGB3, ELOVL4, PROM1 | dominant or recessive | | 1-1.28:10,000 |
| Stickler syndrome (multiple forms) | COL11A1, COL11A2, COL2A1, COL9A1 | dominant or recessive | | 1:7,500-9,000 (U.S.) |
| Strudwick syndrome (spondyloepimetaphyseal dysplasia, Strudwick type) | COL2A1 | dominant | | |
| Tay–Sachs disease | HEXA (15) | recessive | | |
| Tetrahydrobiopterin deficiency | GCH1, PCBD1, PTS, QDPR, MTHFR, DHFR | recessive | | |
| Thanatophoric dysplasia | FGFR3 | dominant | | 1:60,000 |
| Thickened earlobes-conductive deafness syndrome | | | | |
| Treacher Collins syndrome | 5q32–q33.1 (TCOF1, POLR1C, or POLR1D) | dominant | | 1:50,000 |
| Tuberous sclerosis complex (TSC) | TSC1, TSC2 | dominant | | 7-12:100,000 |
| Turner syndrome | X | monosomy | | 1:2,000-2,500 live female births |
| Usher syndrome | MYO7A, USH1C, CDH23, PCDH15, USH1G, USH2A, GPR98, DFNB31, CLRN1 | recessive | | 3-6:100,000 (type I) |
| Variegate porphyria | PPOX | dominant | | |
| Viljoen-Kallis-Voges syndrome | | recessive | | |
| von Hippel–Lindau disease | VHL | dominant | | 1:36,000 |
| von Willebrand disease | VWF | dominant | | 1:10,000 |
| Waardenburg syndrome | PAX3, MITF, WS2B, WS2C, SNAI2, EDNRB, EDN3, SOX10 | dominant | | 1:42,000 |
| Warkany syndrome 2 | 8 | trisomy | | |
| Weiss-Kruszka syndrome | ZNF462 (9q31.2) | autosomal dominant | | |
| Weissenbacher–Zweymüller syndrome | COL11A2 | recessive | | |
| Weyer's ulnar ray/oligodactyly syndrome | | recessive | | |
| Williams syndrome | 7q11.23 | dominant | | 1:10,000 |
| Wilson disease | ATP7B | recessive | | 1:30,000 |
| Woodhouse–Sakati syndrome | C2ORF37 (2q22.3–q35) | recessive | | |
| Wolf–Hirschhorn syndrome | 4p16.3 | dominant, often de novo | | 1:50,000 |
| Xeroderma pigmentosum | 15 ERCC4 | recessive | | |
| X-linked intellectual disability and macroorchidism (fragile X syndrome) | X | | | |
| X-linked spinal-bulbar muscle atrophy (spinal and bulbar muscular atrophy) | X | | | |
| Xp11.2 duplication syndrome | Xp11.2 | D | | 1:1,000,000 |
| X-linked severe combined immunodeficiency (X-SCID) | X | | | |
| X-linked sideroblastic anemia (XLSA) | ALAS2 (X) | | | |
| 47,XXX (triple X syndrome) | X | C | | 1:1,000 females |
| XXXX syndrome (48, XXXX) | X | | | 1:50,000 females |
| XXXXX syndrome (49,XXXXX) | X | | | 1:85,000-250,000 females |
| XXXXY syndrome (49,XXXXY) | X | | | 1:85,000-100,000 males |
| XYY syndrome (47,XYY) | Y | | | 1:1,000 male births |
| XXYY syndrome (48,XXYY) | X, Y | | | 1:18,000-40,000 males |
| XYYY syndrome (48,XYYY) | Y | | | <1:1,000,000 males |
| XXXY syndrome (48,XXXY) | X | | | 1:17,000-50,000 males |
| XYYYY syndrome (49,XYYYY) | Y | | | <1:1,000,000 males |
| Zellweger syndrome | PEX1, PEX2, PEX3, PEX5, PEX6, PEX10, PEX12, PEX13, PEX14, PEX16, PEX19, PEX26 | recessive | | 1:50,000-75,000 |
