= Oligodactyly =

Developmental anomaly of fewer fingers and toes

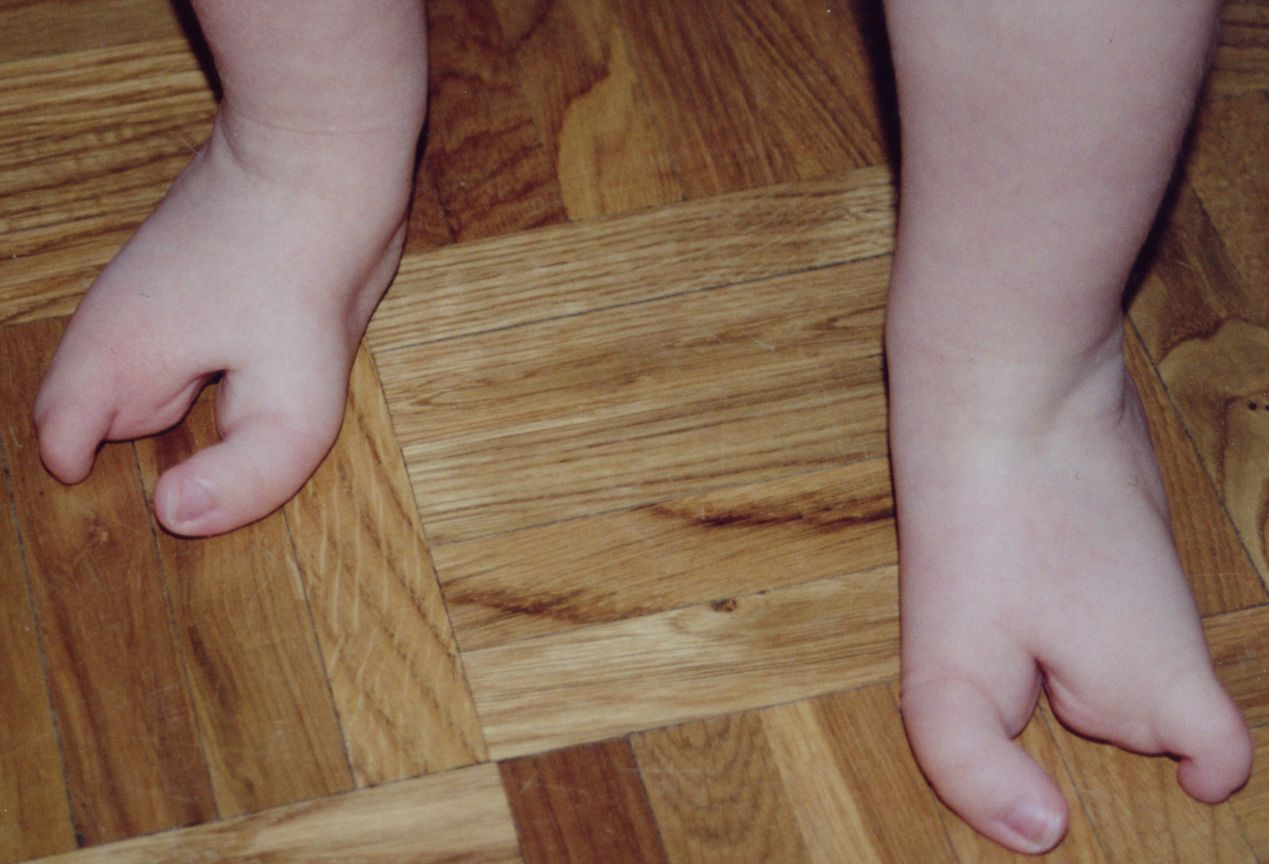
- Oligodactyly as a result of ectrodactyly on the feet of a one-year-old child
- Specialty: Medical genetics

Oligodactyly (from Greek ὀλίγος (olígos) 'few' and δάκτυλος (daktylos) 'finger') is the presence of fewer than five digits (fingers or toes) on a hand or foot.

It is quite often incorrectly called hypodactyly; the Greek prefixes hypo- and hyper- are used for continuous scales (e.g. in hypoglycaemia and hyperthermia), as opposed to discrete or countable scales, where oligo- and poly- should be used (e.g. in oligarchy and polygamy). Oligodactyly is therefore the opposite of polydactyly. Very rare, this medical condition usually has a genetic or familial cause.

Oligodactyly is sometimes a sign or symptom of several syndromes including Poland syndrome and Weyer ulnar ray syndrome. It is a type of dysmelia.

Ectrodactyly is an extreme instance of oligodactyly, involving the absence of one or more central digits of the hand or foot and is also known as split hand/split foot malformation (SHFM). The hands and feet of people with ectrodactyly are often described as "claw-like" and may include only the thumb and one finger (usually either the little finger, ring finger, or a syndactyly of the two) with similar abnormalities of the feet.

Severity of hand malformations in Cornelia de Lange syndrome, all individuals with a severe phenotype on the NIPBL gene exhibit oligodactyly, extreme clinodactyly and proximally-placed thumbs; while mutation negative individuals exhibit only clinodactyly and/or polydactyly in some severe cases.

People with oligodactyly often have full use of the remaining digits and adapt well to their condition. They are not greatly hindered in their daily activities, if at all. Even those with the most extreme forms are known to engage in tasks that require fine control, such as writing and bootmaking as well as working as a cab driver.

The Vadoma people of Zimbabwe have a high frequency of oligodactyly.

== In popular culture ==
Many animated cartoon characters have only four fingers because the hands are more easily drawn that way. It also differentiates them from real people. Walt Disney depicted Snow White with five fingers while the Seven Dwarfs are drawn with four. Extraterrestrials are often drawn with three fingers. Japanese cartoon characters typically have five fingers: this is because many Japanese have tetraphobia, and to prevent an offensive reference to the tradition of cutting a finger off as punishment.
