= Nathanael Koh =

Singaporean composer (born 2010)

Nathanael Koh (born 20 March 2010) is a Singaporean child prodigy.

== Early life and education ==
Koh was born in Singapore on 20 March 2010. About a year later, he was diagnosed with global developmental delay. He began playing the piano at the age of three. He later switched to music theory on his teacher's recommendation due to his weak fingers. Koh learned to play the clarinet and the saxophone. From 2015 to 2020, Koh and his family lived in Otago, New Zealand. He studied music composition at the Australian National University and graduated in 2023, becoming the university's youngest ever graduand.

== Career ==
Koh is currently a composer-in-residence at the Kids' Philharmonic@sg Orchestra.
