= Weiss-Kruszka syndrome =

Genetic disorder

Weiss-Kruszka Syndrome (also called WKS, WSKA, or ZNF462 disorder) is a rare genetic disorder caused by haploinsufficiency of the ZNF462 gene. It is characterized by metopic ridging or craniosynostosis, ptosis, nonspecific facial differences, developmental delay, and/or autistic features. As of August 2025, only 53 cases have been reported in medical literature.. About 95% of cases arise from de novo variants not present in either parent, but the condition can be inherited in an autosomal dominant manner. Weiss-Kruszka syndrome is catalogued in the Online Mendelian Inheritance in Man database under OMIM #617371 and #618619.

Individual with Weiss-Kruzska syndrome, showing unilateral ptosis, an exaggerated cupid's bow, and thick eyebrows

== Signs and symptoms ==
Weiss-Kruszka Syndrome manifests with a wide range of potential features. Most individuals with WKS exhibit a subset of these features. The features may be broadly categorized as being craniofacial, neurodevelopmental, or other.

=== Craniofacial features ===
Sources:

- Ptosis (drooping eyelid)
- Downslanting palpebral fissures
- Arched eyebrows
- Short, upturned nose with a bulbous tip
- Ear anomalies
- Metopic ridging or metopic craniosynostosis, producing a triangular-shaped forehead
- Exaggerated cupid's bow of the upper lip
- Epicanthal folds
- Hypertelorism (increased distance between eyes)
- Dental anomalies, including widely spaced teeth and hypodontia (missing teeth)

=== Neurodevelopmental features ===
Sources:

- Developmental delay (global, motor, or speech)
- Intellectual disability
- Autistic features or a formal autism spectrum disorder diagnosis
- Hypotonia
- Brain MRI abnormalities, most often involving the corpus callosum

=== Other features ===
Sources:

- Growth delay
- Feeding difficulties including acid reflux
- Congenital heart defects
- Hearing loss or impairment
- Minor limb anomalies, including fifth-finger clinodactyly and single palmar creases
- Skeletal anomalies, including pectus excavatum and scoliosis
- Palate anomalies
- Growth hormone deficiency

=== Frequency of reported features ===
Reported frequencies of key features among a 2025 pooled literature cohort of 53 individuals with molecularly confirmed Weiss–Kruszka syndrome are summarized below. Because these figures are drawn from published case reports rather than a population-based sample, they may not reflect true prevalence in all affected individuals.

Frequency of reported features (pooled cohort, n = 53)
Feature	Frequency
Demographics
Sex (female:male)	16/53 female (30%), 37/53 male (70%)
Inheritance	De novo: 36/53 (68%); inherited: 8/53 (15%)
Craniofacial
Ptosis	40/53 (75%)
Arched eyebrows	32/53 (60%)
Down-slanting palpebral fissures	30/53 (57%)
Exaggerated cupid's bow / wide philtrum	29/53 (55%)
Short, upturned nose with bulbous tip	27/53 (51%)
Ear anomalies	27/53 (51%)
Metopic ridging or craniosynostosis	23/53 (43%)
Epicanthal folds	20/53 (38%)
Neurodevelopmental
Developmental delay	40/53 (75%)
Intellectual disability	29/53 (55%)
Autism spectrum disorder	18/53 (34%)
Hypotonia	16/53 (30%)
Cranial MRI abnormalities	12/53 (23%)
Other
Congenital heart disease	17/53 (32%)
Feeding issues	16/53 (30%)
Limb anomalies	14/53 (26%)

== Genetics ==
Weiss-Kruszka syndrome is caused by heterozygous loss-of-function variants in ZNF462 (zinc finger protein 462, also known by synonyms DKFZP762N2316, KIAA1803, and ZFP462 ) or by deletions of this region. ZNF462 is located on chromosome 9q31.2.

ZNF462 encodes a protein with 23 C2H2 zinc finger domains that contributes to DNA binding and gene regulation. It is known to be involved in chromatin remodeling, transcriptional regulation, and epigenetic regulation. In animal models, ZNF462 has been shown to play an important role during embryonic development. However, the molecular mechanism by which loss of ZNF462 produces the features of Weiss-Kruszka syndrome is not known.

Most reported pathogenic variants are nonsense or frameshift changes predicted to trigger nonsense-mediated mRNA decay or produce a truncated protein. Missense and splice-site variants have also been reported. As of a 2023 review of the Human Gene Mutation Database, approximately 80% of reported ZNF462 variants are located in exon 3.

Approximately 95% of cases arise from an apparently de novo variant. In the remainder, the variant is inherited from an affected parent in an autosomal dominant pattern, with each child of an affected individual having a 50% chance of inheriting it; parental germline mosaicism has been reported in at least one family. No genotype–phenotype correlation has been established: relatives carrying the same variant have shown substantially different severity, so a given ZNF462 variant cannot be used on its own to predict clinical course.

== Diagnosis ==
No formal diagnostic criteria have been established. Weiss–Kruszka syndrome is suspected clinically in individuals with metopic ridging or synostosis, ptosis, nonspecific facial dysmorphism, developmental delay and/or autistic features, and corpus callosum abnormalities on brain MRI. Diagnosis is confirmed by molecular genetic testing identifying a heterozygous pathogenic variant in ZNF462 or a heterozygous 9q31.2 deletion involving the gene. Because the phenotype overlaps with other intellectual disability syndromes, most reported individuals were diagnosed through exome sequencing or chromosomal microarray analysis rather than targeted single-gene testing.

== Management ==
No disease-specific treatment exists. Published management recommendations, largely following GeneReviews, include:

- Referral to a craniofacial team or neurosurgeon for craniosynostosis
- Standard ophthalmologic treatment of ptosis
- Early intervention services and individualized education plans for developmental delay and intellectual disability
- Feeding therapy, with gastrostomy tube placement for persistent feeding difficulties or dysphagia
- Hearing aids and audiology follow-up
- Standard cardiology management for congenital heart defects
- Behavioral interventions such as applied behavior analysis for autism spectrum features
- Periodic surveillance: head circumference and shape in infancy and early childhood, growth and nutritional status, developmental progress, and ophthalmology and audiology evaluation as clinically indicated

One case report described recombinant human growth hormone therapy in a patient with short stature, with height velocity increasing from –3.49 SD to –1.15 SD over two years of treatment.

Genetic counseling is recommended because of the autosomal dominant inheritance pattern and a documented case of parental germline mosaicism. Prenatal and preimplantation genetic testing are available once a familial variant has been identified.

== Prognosis ==
Reported outcomes range from independent adult living with support to lifelong residential care, including among individuals with the same or similar variants. Whether life expectancy is reduced is not known; one affected individual has been reported alive at age 67.

== Epidemiology ==
Population prevalence is unknown. Case reports and series published through 2025 describe 53 affected individuals drawn mainly from European and Chinese cohorts. Pooled case data have shown an approximate 2:1 male-to-female ratio among reported individuals.

== History ==
ZNF462 was first implicated in human disease in 2003, when Ramocki and colleagues described a balanced translocation disrupting the genes KIAA1803 (ZNF462) and ASXL2 in a patient with absence of the corpus callosum and ocular colobomas. Weiss–Kruszka syndrome was delineated as a distinct clinical entity in 2017 by Weiss, Kruszka, and colleagues, who described haploinsufficiency of ZNF462 in a case series with craniofacial anomalies, corpus callosum dysgenesis, ptosis, and developmental delay. A 2019 follow-up study by Kruszka and colleagues further characterized the phenotype. The condition is catalogued in OMIM as entry 618619; ZNF462 itself is catalogued separately as OMIM 617371.

== See also ==
- List of genetic disorders
