= Familial thoracic aortic aneurysm and aortic dissection =

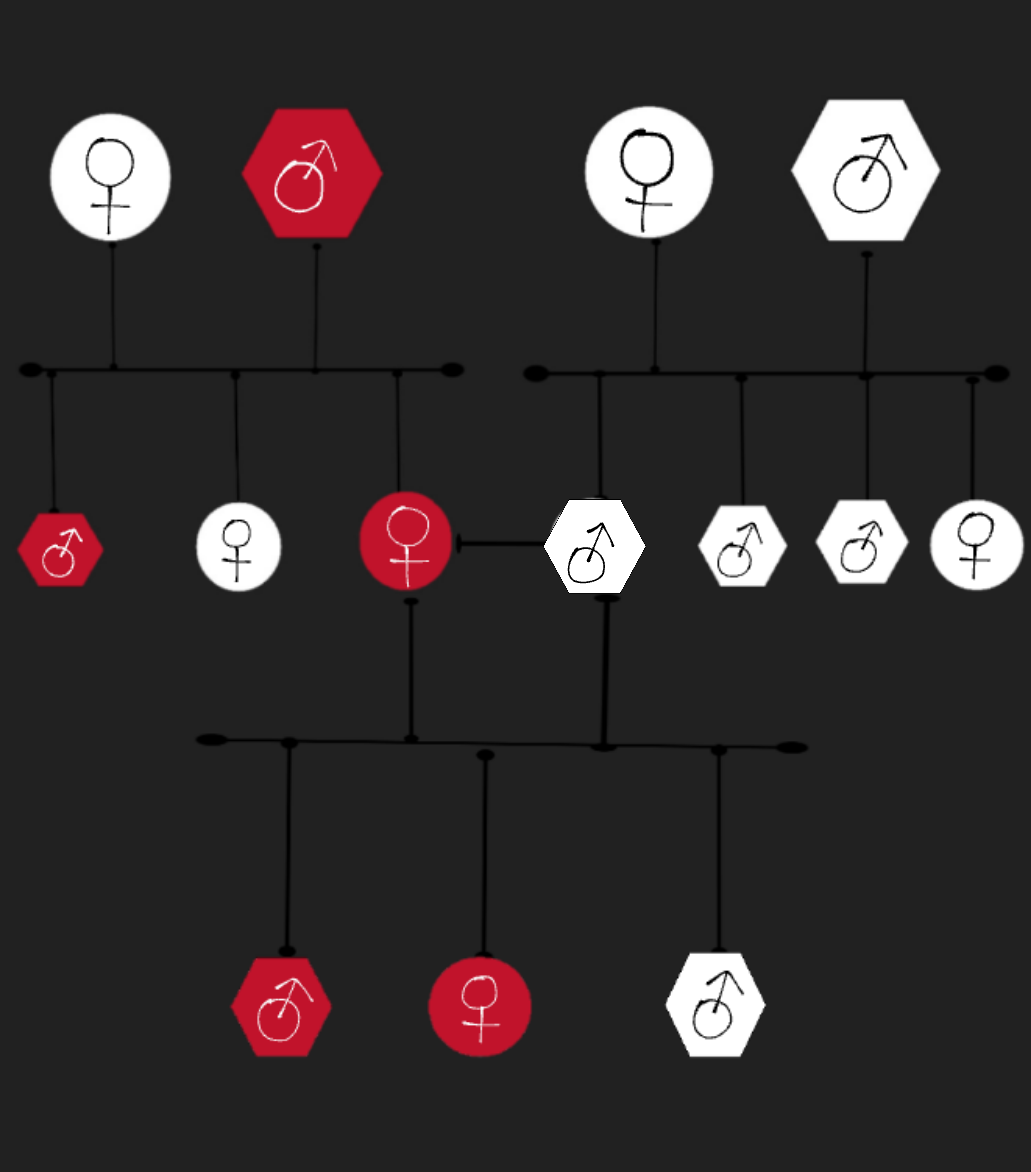
- This disorder is inherited in an autosomal dominant fashion.
- Specialty: Medical genetics, Cardiology
- Symptoms: high frequency of thoracic aortic aneurysms and aortic dissections in the family (including oneself)
- Complications: Aortic rupture
- Usual onset: Adolescence to early adulthood
- Duration: Life-long
- Causes: Genetic mutation
- Prognosis: Poor
- Frequency: Not known

Familial thoracic aortic aneurysm and aortic dissection is a very rare vascular genetic disorder, it's characterized by recurrent thoracic aortic aneurysms and aortic dissections within a family, these mentioned complications affect one or more aortic segments without any other disease being associated with them. People with this disorder have a higher chance of having a potentially fatal aortic rupture. This disorder is the cause of 20% of thoracic aortic aneurysms

Some families affected by this condition have shown mild versions of some symptoms that are associated with Marfan syndrome and Loeys-Dietz syndrome, these signs include tall stature, joint hypermobility, cutaneous stretch marks, and either pectus excavatum or pectus carinatum. Less common symptoms in other affected families include scoliosis, congenital heart defects, inguinal hernia, and/or livedo reticularis.

== Etiology ==
This disorder is caused by mutations in one or more of the following genes:

- FOXE3 (located on 1p33)
- SMAD2 (located on 18q21.1)
- LOX (located on 5q23.3-31.2)
- MAT2A (located on 2p11.2)
- ELN (located on 7q11.23)
- HEY2 (located on 6q22.31)
- TGFB3 (located on 14q24.3)
- TGFBR1 (located on 9q22.33)
- TGFBR2 (located on 3p24.1)
- FBN1 (located on 15q21.1)
- ACTA2 (located on 10q23.31
- MYLK (located on 3q21.1)
- SMAD3 (located on 15q22.33)
- PRKG1 (located on 10q11.23-q21.1)
- MFAP5 (located on 12p13.31)
- TGFB2 (located on 1q41)
- SMAD4 (located on 18q21.2)
- MYH11 (located on 16p13.11)

This disorder is inherited in an autosomal dominant manner, meaning only one copy of a mutated gene is needed in order for the disease to develop.
