= FBXW7 neurodevelopmental syndrome =

- Other names: FBXW7 neurodevelopmental disorder
- Specialty: Medical genetics, Neurology
- Symptoms: Multi-systemic
- Complications: Social skill issues, constant uncomfortability, muscle problems
- Usual onset: Birth
- Duration: Lifelong
- Causes: Genetic mutation in the FBXW7 gene, in chromosome 4q
- Risk factors: Having a parent with the condition
- Prevention: none
- Prognosis: Good (with treatment), Medium (without treatment)
- Frequency: rare, only 35 cases have been reported in medical literature
- Deaths: -

FBXW7 neurodevelopmental syndrome is a very rare genetic disorder characterized by gastrointestinal, brain, and muscle anomalies accompanied by intellectual disabilities and developmental delays.

== Signs and symptoms ==
A study done in 2022 found that nearly all patients with this condition had intellectual disabilities and developmental delays, ranging from borderline to severe. 62% of FBXW7 patients had hypotonia, 46% had feeding difficulties and regular constipation, and 23% of them had epilepsy. Brain imaging revealed anomalies in the structure of the cerebellum, the nervous fibres, and white matter. Reduction of the gene associated with this condition in a fly model resulted in an intellectually impaired fly which didn't fly away when exposed to stimulus.

== Causes ==
This condition is associated with either nonsense/frameshift/splice-site/missense mutations or heterozygous deletions of the tumor suppressor FBXW7 gene, in chromosome 4. These mutations (most commonly the missense ones) were concentrated in the substrate binding surface of the WD40 domain, they (the mutations) are thought to reduce substrate binding balance.

== Epidemiology ==
This condition has been described in 35 individuals from 32 families in 7 countries worldwide.

The age of the people affected ranged from 2 years old to 44 years old.

== History ==
This condition was first discovered in April 2022 by Sarah E M Stephenson et al. 35 people were gathered from across the world and their genomes were analyzed.
