= SGPL1 =

Enzyme

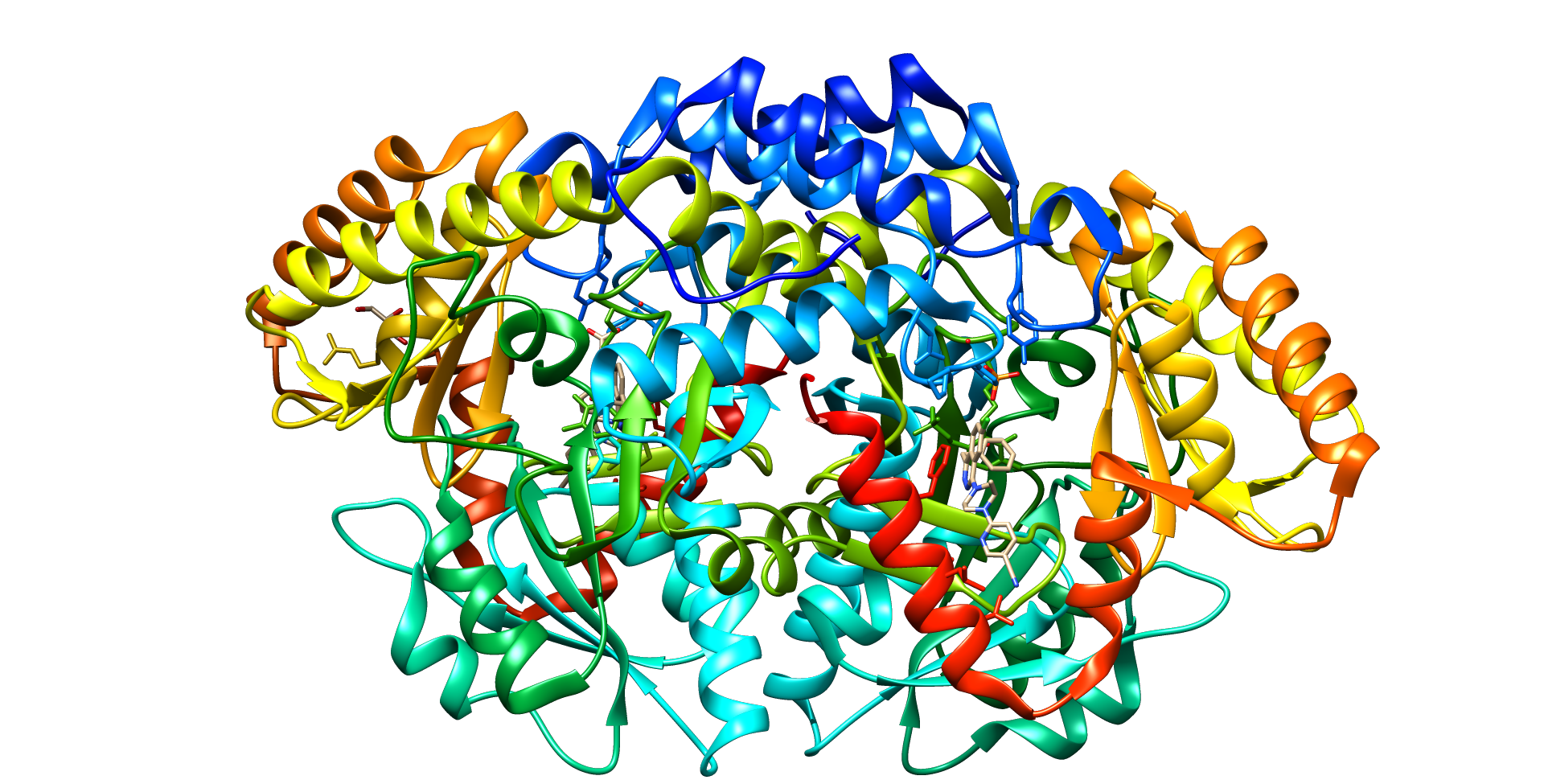

Identifiers
- Aliases: SGPL1, S1PL, SPL, sphingosine-1-phosphate lyase 1
- External IDs: OMIM: 603729; MGI: 1261415; GeneCards: SGPL1
Available structures
PDB	Ortholog search: PDBe RCSB
PDB	List of PDB id codes 4Q6R
Enzyme activity
EC #	BRENDA	ExPASy	KEGG	MetaCyc
4.1.2.27	↗	↗	↗	↗

Gene location (Human)
Chr.	Chromosome 10 (human)
Band	10q22.1	Start	70,815,948 bp
Band	10q22.1	End	70,881,184 bp

Gene location (Mouse)
Chr.	Chromosome 10 (mouse)
Band	10 B4|10 32.14 cM	Start	60,934,421 bp
Band	10 B4|10 32.14 cM	End	60,983,482 bp
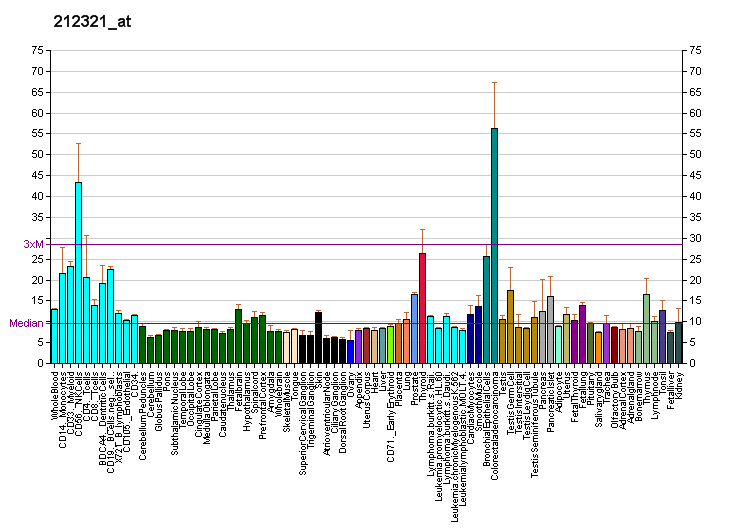

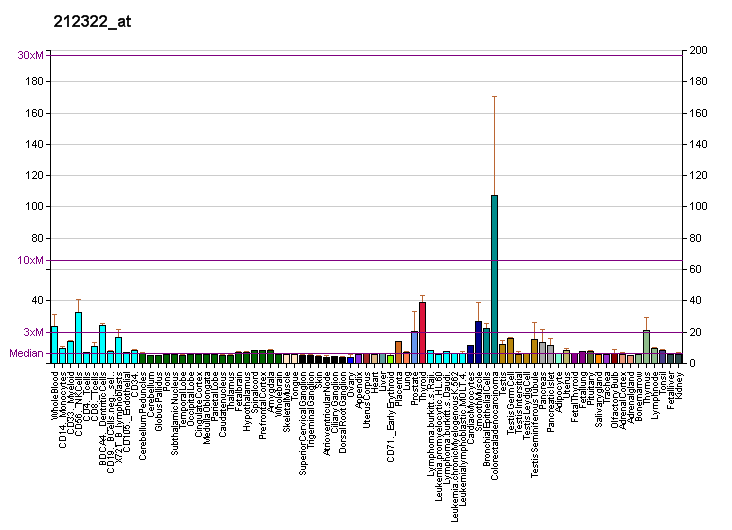

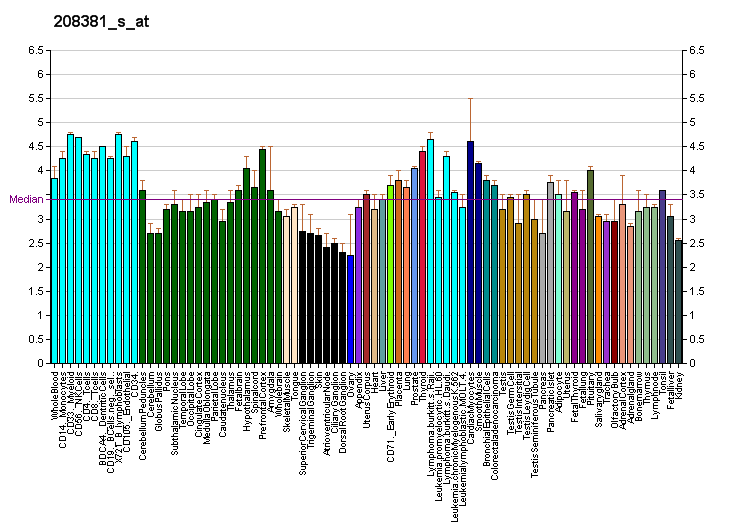
RNA expression pattern
Bgee	Human / Mouse (ortholog); Top expressed in: skin of thigh; gingival epithelium; sural nerve; ventricular zone; skin of arm; germinal epithelium; islet of Langerhans; secondary oocyte; epithelium of nasopharynx; ganglionic eminence / Top expressed in: transitional epithelium of urinary bladder; olfactory epithelium; stroma of bone marrow; gastrula; decidua; lip; thymus; jejunum; granulocyte; skin of external ear; More reference expression data
BioGPS	More reference expression data
Gene ontology
Molecular function	protein binding; catalytic activity; lyase activity; pyridoxal phosphate binding; carboxy-lyase activity; sphinganine-1-phosphate aldolase activity
Cellular component	integral component of membrane; endoplasmic reticulum membrane; membrane; integral component of endoplasmic reticulum membrane; endoplasmic reticulum
Biological process	fibroblast migration; roof of mouth development; luteinization; Leydig cell differentiation; estrogen metabolic process; androgen metabolic process; kidney development; ceramide metabolic process; regulation of multicellular organism growth; lipid metabolism; carboxylic acid metabolic process; skeletal system morphogenesis; sphingolipid biosynthetic process; post-embryonic development; fatty acid metabolic process; female gonad development; vasculogenesis; nitrogen compound metabolic process; spermatogenesis; apoptotic signaling pathway; platelet-derived growth factor receptor signaling pathway; face morphogenesis; apoptotic process; sphingolipid metabolic process; sphingolipid catabolic process; hemopoiesis; ameboidal-type cell migration
Sources:Amigo / QuickGO
Orthologs
Databases	NCBI: entry; OMA: entry
Species	Human	Mouse
Entrez	8879	20397
Ensembl	ENSG00000166224	ENSMUSG00000020097
UniProt	O95470	Q8R0X7
RefSeq (mRNA)	NM_003901	NM_009163; NM_001316673; NM_001316674
RefSeq (protein)	NP_003892	NP_001303602; NP_001303603; NP_033189
Location (UCSC)	Chr 10: 70.82 – 70.88 Mb	Chr 10: 60.93 – 60.98 Mb
PubMed search
- Wikidata
View/Edit Human	View/Edit Mouse

Sphingosine-1-phosphate lyase 1 is an enzyme that, in humans, is encoded by the SGPL1 gene.

== Pathology ==
A mutation in the gene can lead to sphingosine phosphate lyase insufficiency syndrome, which can cause steroid-resistant nephrotic syndrome with multisystemic manifestations, as such as ichthyosis, acanthosis, adrenal insufficiency, immunodeficiency, and neurologic defects.
