= Cyanocobalamin reductase (cyanide-eliminating) =

Identifiers
- EC no.: 1.16.1.6
- CAS no.: 131145-00-1

Databases
- BRENDA: enzyme data
- ExPASy: NiceZyme view
- KEGG: enzyme entry
- MetaCyc: metabolic pathway
- Rhea: reactions
- PDB structures: RCSB PDB PDBe PDBsum
Search
- PMC: articles
- PubMed: articles
- NCBI: proteins

In enzymology, a cyanocobalamin reductase (cyanide-eliminating) (EC 1.16.1.6) is an enzyme that catalyzes the chemical reaction

cob(I)alamin + cyanide + NADP^{+} $\rightleftharpoons$ cyanocob(III)alamin + NADPH + H^{+}

The 3 substrates of this enzyme are cob(I)alamin, cyanide, and NADP^{+}, whereas its 3 products are cyanocob(III)alamin, NADPH, and H^{+}.

This enzyme belongs to the family of oxidoreductases, specifically those that oxidize metal ions and use NAD+ or NADP+ as an electron acceptor (for that oxidization reaction). The systematic name of this enzyme class is cob(I)alamin, cyanide:NADP+ oxidoreductase. Other names in common use include cyanocobalamin reductase, cyanocobalamin reductase (NADPH, cyanide-eliminating), cyanocobalamin reductase (NADPH, CN-eliminating), and NADPH:cyanocob(III)alamin oxidoreductase (cyanide-eliminating). This enzyme participates in porphyrin and chlorophyll metabolism. It uses one cofactor, FAD.

Humans have one gene producing a protein with this enzymatic activity, MMACHC. This enzyme also has alkylcobalamin reductase activity.
