= GRIN2B-related neurodevelopmental disorder =

- Other names: GRIM2B-associated disorder
- Specialty: Medical genetics, Pediatry, Neurology
- Symptoms: Mainly developmental delays, intellectual disabilities, craniofacial dysmorphisms, behavioural problems and muscle tone anomalies
- Complications: Learning disability, communication delay, social ineption
- Usual onset: Birth
- Duration: Lifelong
- Causes: Genetic mutation
- Diagnostic method: Genetic testing and physical examination
- Prevention: None
- Prognosis: Medium
- Frequency: Rare, only 100 cases have been described in medical literature
- Deaths: -

GRIN2B-related neurodevelopmental disorder is a rare neurodevelopmental disorder that is characterized by developmental delays and intellectual disabilities of variable degrees, muscle tone anomalies, feeding difficulties, and behavioral problems.

== Signs and symptoms ==
The following list comprises most of the symptoms people with GRIN2B show:

- Intellectual disability (mild to severe)
- Developmental delay (mild to severe)
- Hypotonia
- Epilepsy
- Autism spectrum disorder
- Autistic-like behavior
- Microcephaly
- Hyperactivity
- Stereotypy
- Spasticity
- Feeding difficulties

Less common symptoms include:

- Visual impairment
- Dystonia
- Dyskinesia
- Other choreiform movement disorder

== Causes ==
This condition is caused by mutations in the GRIN2B gene, located in chromosome 12.

This gene instructs how to make a protein called GluN2B, a type of NMDA receptor, which is found in brain neurons during ante-natal brain development. It is involved in correct brain development and function, regulating memory, synaptic plasticity and the ability of learning.

== Epidemiology ==
Around 100 cases have been described in medical literature.
