= PLEKHG4 =

Protein-coding gene in the species Homo sapiens

Identifiers
- Aliases: PLEKHG4, ARHGEF44, PRTPHN1, SCA4, pleckstrin homology and RhoGEF domain containing G4
- External IDs: OMIM: 609526; MGI: 2142544; GeneCards: PLEKHG4

Gene location (Human)
Chr.	Chromosome 16 (human)
Band	16q22.1	Start	67,277,510 bp
Band	16q22.1	End	67,289,499 bp

Gene location (Mouse)
Chr.	Chromosome 8 (mouse)
Band	8|8 D3	Start	106,099,906 bp
Band	8|8 D3	End	106,109,494 bp
RNA expression pattern
Bgee	Human / Mouse (ortholog); Top expressed in: right testis; left testis; gonad; left ovary; right ovary; cartilage tissue; testicle; tibial nerve; epithelium of lactiferous gland; lactiferous duct / Top expressed in: spermatocyte; body of femur; calvaria; seminiferous tubule; neural layer of retina; gastrula; tail of embryo; embryo; embryo; cerebellar cortex; More reference expression data
BioGPS	n/a
Orthologs
Databases	NCBI: entry; OMA: entry
Species	Human	Mouse
Entrez	25894	102075
Ensembl	ENSG00000196155	ENSMUSG00000014782
UniProt	Q58EX7	n/a
RefSeq (mRNA)	NM_001129727; NM_001129728; NM_001129729; NM_001129731; NM_015432	NM_001081333; NM_175321; NM_001364406
RefSeq (protein)	NP_001123199; NP_001123200; NP_001123201; NP_001123203	n/a
Location (UCSC)	Chr 16: 67.28 – 67.29 Mb	Chr 8: 106.1 – 106.11 Mb
PubMed search
- Wikidata
View/Edit Human	View/Edit Mouse

Puratrophin-1 is a protein that in humans is encoded by the PLEKHG4 gene.
