= 7p22.1 microduplication syndrome =

Genetic disorder

- Other names: Trisomy 7p22.1
- Specialty: Medical genetics
- Symptoms: intellectual disabilities, speech and motor delay, facial dysmorphisms
- Usual onset: Birth
- Duration: Life-long
- Causes: Duplication of the p22.1 region in chromosome 7

7p22.1 microduplication syndrome (also called Trisomy 7p22.1) is a genetic disorder which is characterized by cranial and facial dysmorphisms, intellectual disability, and motor-speech delays. It is caused by a duplication of the p22.1 region of chromosome 7.

== Signs and symptoms ==
The symptoms of this syndrome are (but are not limited to) cranio-facial dysmorphisms such as macrocephaly, frontal bossing, low-set ears, hypertelorism, etc., intellectual disabilities, speech and motor delays, and heart, ocular, renal and skeletal defects (such as patent foramen ovale {heart} or brachydactyly type D {skeletal} ).

== Causes ==
This condition (as the name implies) is caused by a 430 kB duplication of the p22.1 region of chromosome 7. This mutation is autosomal recessive, meaning that a baby would need 1 copy of a mutated gene from both parents in order to show symptoms of the disorder.

== Epidemiology ==
Only 60 cases of 7p22.1 microduplication syndrome have been recorded in medical literature.
