= Amish lethal microcephaly =

- Other names: Microcephaly, Amish type
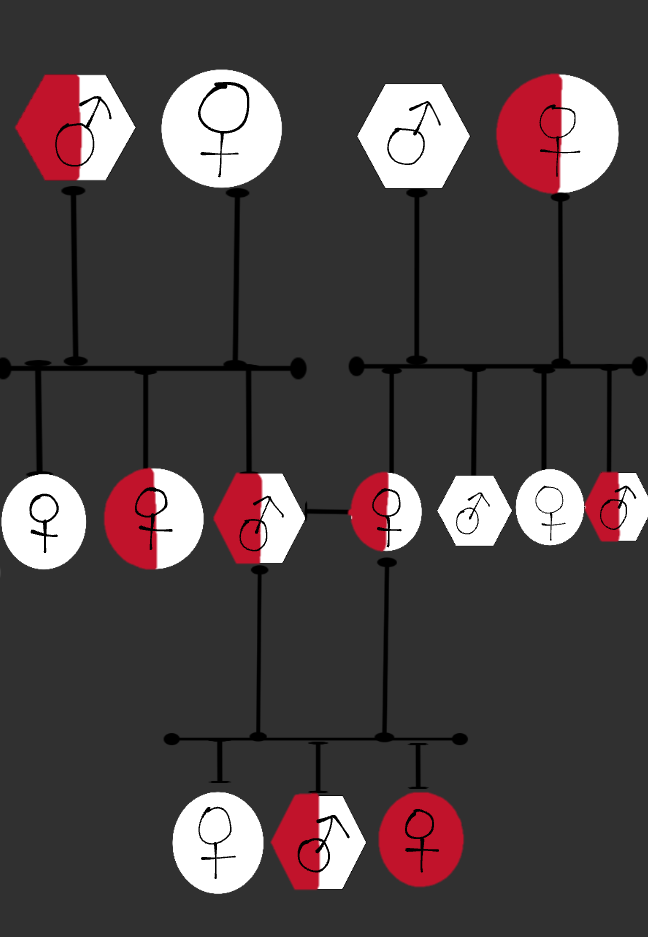
- Amish lethal microcephaly is inherited in an autosomal recessive fashion.
- Specialty: Medical genetics
- Symptoms: liver, brain and craniofacial abnormalities
- Complications: Death
- Usual onset: Birth
- Duration: affected baby's entire life-span
- Causes: Genetic mutation and Founder effect
- Differential diagnosis: Microcephaly, Sudden infant death syndrome
- Prevention: None
- Frequency: 1 in 500 babies inside Old Order Amish communities in Pennsylvania

Amish lethal microcephaly is a rare genetic disorder which is characterized by severe microcephaly (small head) from birth, brain hypoplasia (underdeveloped brain), micrognathia (small chin), irritability (at second or third month of age), seizures, problems controlling their body temperature, high levels of alpha-ketogluraic acid in their urine, and less commonly hepatomegaly (large liver). Babies with this condition typically die when they are 6 months old. This disorder was named after the Amish because it was discovered in Old Order Amish communities in Pennsylvania, where it affects 1 in 500 babies. Additionally, 1 in 11 people in those communities are unaffected carriers of the recessive mutation that causes the disorder. No cases of the disorder have been found outside this population.

This disorder is caused by mutations in the SLC25A19 gene in chromosome 17q25, it follows an autosomal recessive inheritance pattern
