= HYAL1 =

Protein-coding gene in the species Homo sapiens

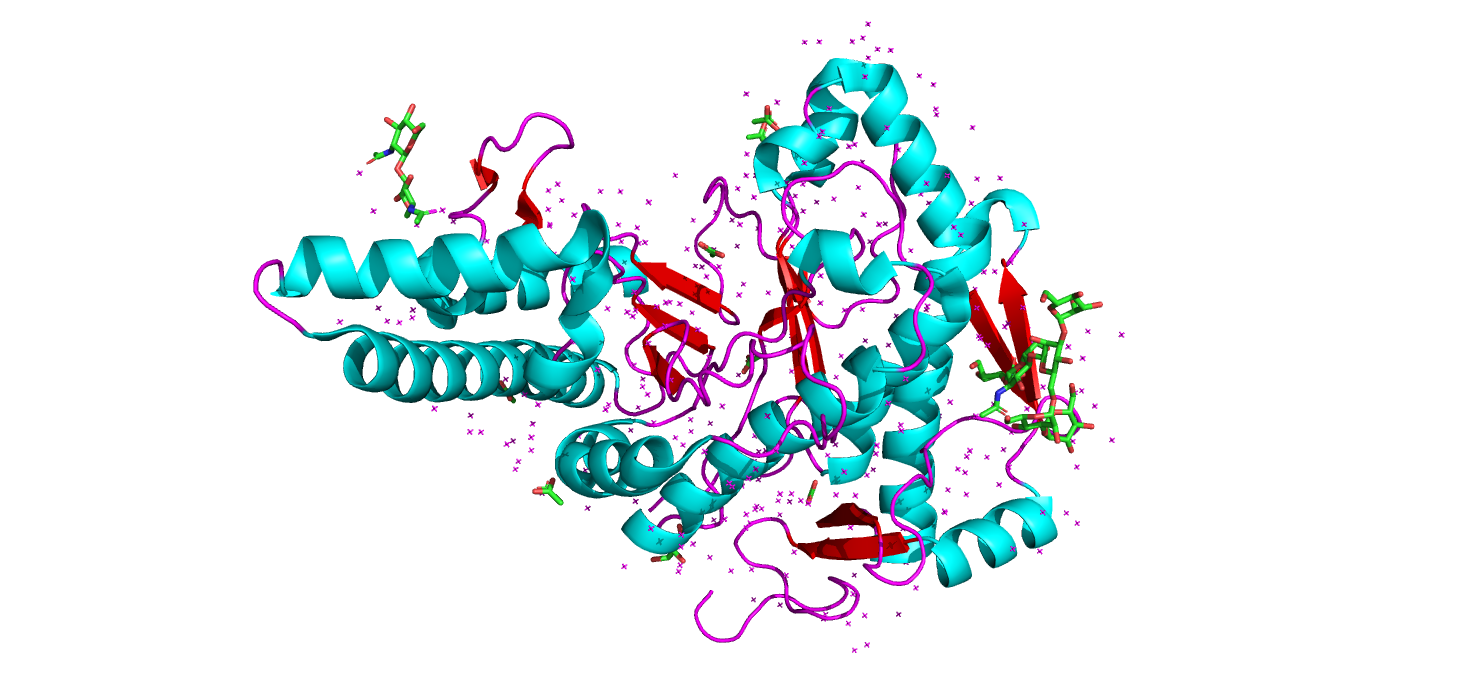

Identifiers
- Aliases: HYAL1, HYAL-1, LUCA1, NAT6, MPS9, hyaluronoglucosaminidase 1, hyaluronidase 1
- External IDs: OMIM: 607071; MGI: 96298; GeneCards: HYAL1
Available structures
PDB	Ortholog search: PDBe RCSB
PDB	List of PDB id codes 2PE4
Enzyme activity
EC #	BRENDA	ExPASy	KEGG	MetaCyc
3.2.1.35	↗	↗	↗	↗

Gene location (Human)
Chr.	Chromosome 3 (human)
Band	3p21.31	Start	50,299,890 bp
Band	3p21.31	End	50,312,381 bp

Gene location (Mouse)
Chr.	Chromosome 9 (mouse)
Band	9 F1|9 58.17 cM	Start	107,454,126 bp
Band	9 F1|9 58.17 cM	End	107,458,909 bp
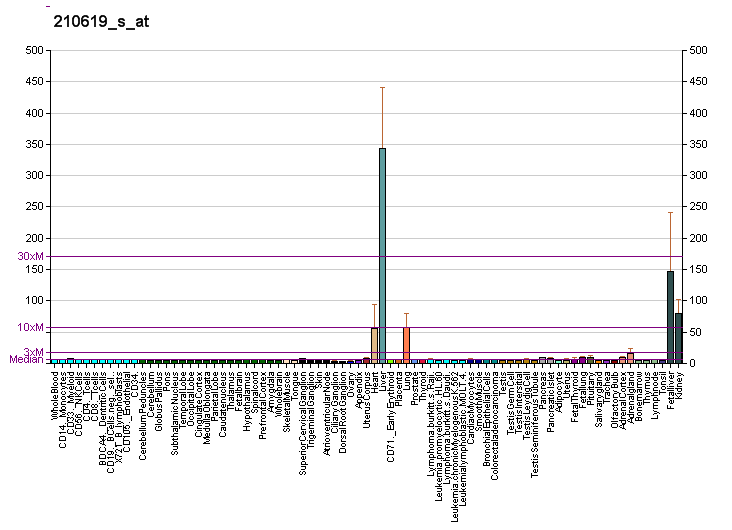
RNA expression pattern
Bgee	Human / Mouse (ortholog); Top expressed in: right lobe of liver; spleen; apex of heart; left ventricle; human kidney; right lung; upper lobe of left lung; right adrenal gland; right adrenal cortex; left adrenal gland / Top expressed in: hepatobiliary system; liver; proximal tubule; urinary bladder; white adipose tissue; genital tubercle; esophagus; lip; lung; zone of skin; More reference expression data
BioGPS	More reference expression data
Gene ontology
Molecular function	transcription factor binding; hydrolase activity, acting on glycosyl bonds; catalytic activity; hydrolase activity; hyaluronan synthase activity; hyalurononglucosaminidase activity
Cellular component	cytoplasm; hyaluranon cable; extracellular region; lysosomal lumen; lysosome; extracellular exosome; cytoplasmic vesicle; extracellular space
Biological process	hyaluronan biosynthetic process; hyaluronan catabolic process; positive regulation of hyaluranon cable assembly; positive regulation of epithelial cell proliferation; response to reactive oxygen species; response to antibiotic; cellular response to tumor necrosis factor; positive regulation of epithelial cell migration; cellular response to platelet-derived growth factor stimulus; positive regulation of growth; cellular response to fibroblast growth factor stimulus; positive regulation of angiogenesis; cellular response to pH; cartilage development; positive regulation of cell growth; cellular response to UV-B; negative regulation of cell growth; cellular response to interleukin-1; chondroitin sulfate catabolic process; embryonic skeletal joint morphogenesis; metabolism; inflammatory response; positive regulation of cell adhesion; hyaluronan metabolic process; positive regulation of G1/S transition of mitotic cell cycle; carbohydrate metabolic process; response to virus; viral entry into host cell
Sources:Amigo / QuickGO
Orthologs
Databases	NCBI: entry; OMA: entry
Species	Human	Mouse
Entrez	3373	15586
Ensembl	ENSG00000114378	ENSMUSG00000010051
UniProt	Q12794	Q91ZJ9
RefSeq (mRNA)	NM_033159; NM_153281; NM_153282; NM_153283; NM_153284 NM_153285; NM_153286	NM_008317; NM_001331161
RefSeq (protein)	NP_149349; NP_695013; NP_695014; NP_695015; NP_695017	NP_001318090; NP_032343
Location (UCSC)	Chr 3: 50.3 – 50.31 Mb	Chr 9: 107.45 – 107.46 Mb
PubMed search
- Wikidata
View/Edit Human	View/Edit Mouse

Hyaluronidase-1 is an enzyme that in humans is encoded by the HYAL1 gene.

== Function ==
This gene encodes a lysosomal hyaluronidase. Hyaluronidases intracellularly degrade hyaluronan, one of the major glycosaminoglycans of the extracellular matrix. Hyaluronan is thought to be involved in cell proliferation, migration and differentiation. This enzyme is active at an acidic pH and is the major hyaluronidase in plasma. Mutations in this gene are associated with mucopolysaccharidosis type IX, or hyaluronidase deficiency. The gene is one of several related genes in a region of chromosome 3p21.3 associated with tumor suppression. Multiple transcript variants encoding different isoforms have been found for this gene.

== Structure ==
HYAL1 was first purified from human plasma and urine. The enzyme is 435 amino acids long with a molecular weight of 55-60 kDa.

The crystal structure of HYAL1 was determined by Chao, Muthukumar, and Herzberg. The enzyme is composed of two closely associated domains: a N-terminal catalytic domain (Phe22-Thr352) and a smaller C-terminal domain (Ser353-Trp435). The catalytic domain adopts a distorted (β/α)_{8} barrel fold similar to that of bee venom hyaluronidase. Within the catalytic domain, residues such as Tyr247, Asp129, Glu131, Asn350, and Tyr202 play important roles in the cleavage of the β1→4 linkage between N-acetylglucosamine and glucuronic acid units in hyaluronan.

== Mechanism ==
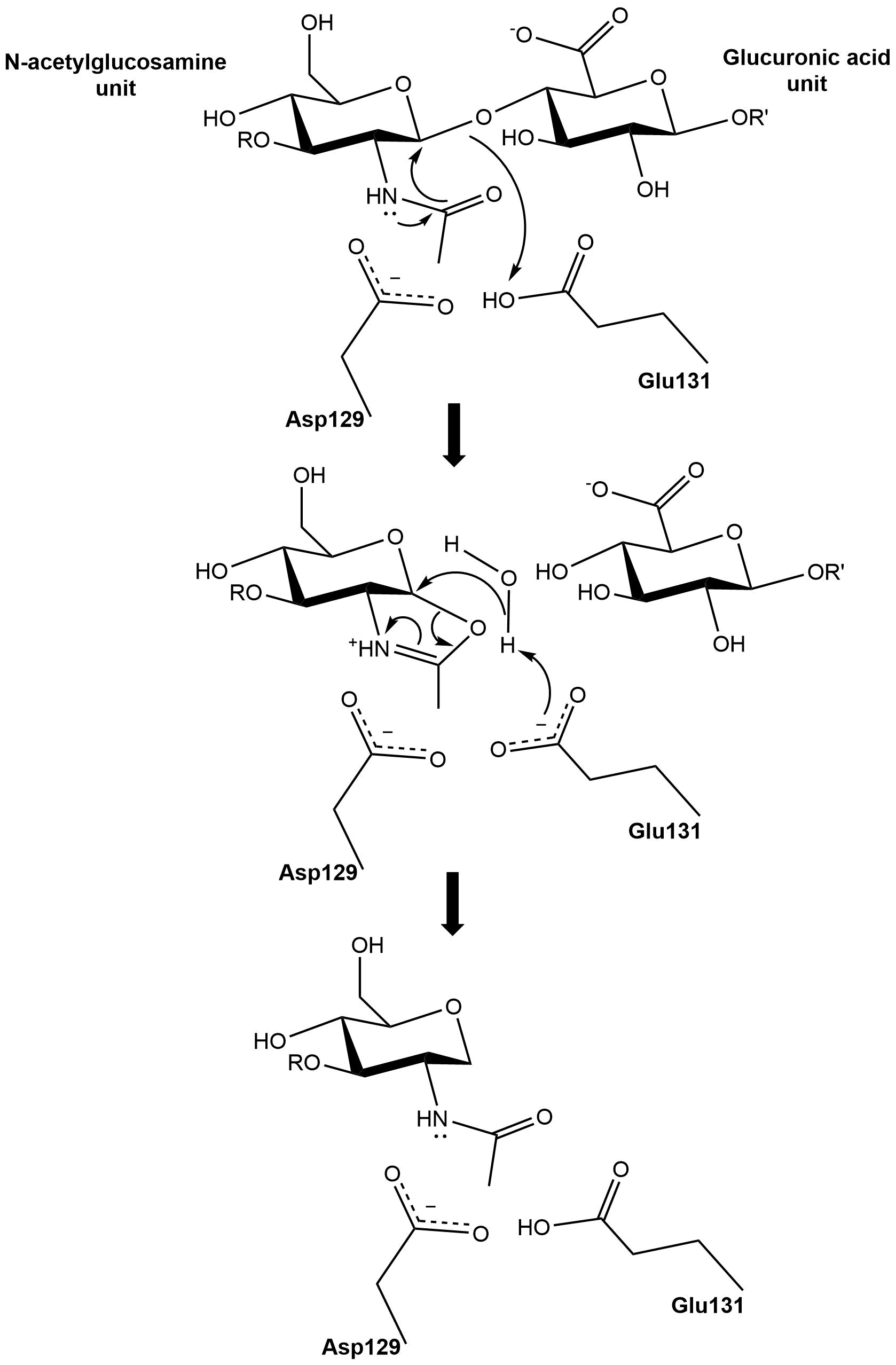
Mechanism of hyaluronan degradation.

HYAL1 is responsible for the hydrolysis of intracellular hyaluronan of all sizes into fragments as small as tetrasaccharides.

In the optimal pH state of 4.0, Asp129 and Glu131 share a proton. Intermolecular resonance in the amide bond in the N-acetylglucosamine unit of the bound hyaluronan polymer leads to a transition state with a positive charge on the nitrogen and an oxyanion nucleophile, which is stabilized by hydrogen bond interactions with Tyr247, that can perform an intramolecular attack on the electrophilic carbon. This attack forms a 5-membered ring that is stabilized by the negative charge of Asp129 that forms as the leaving hydroxyl group of the glucuronic acid unit takes the proton from Glu131. The now negatively charged Glu131 is primed to activate a water molecule for the hydrolysis of the intermolecular ring intermediate to restore N-acetylglucosamine.

Tyr202 and Asn350, while not directly involved in the β1→4 linkage cleavage, were identified to be important to HYAL1 function. HYAL1 uses Tyr202 as a substrate binding determinant and also requires proper glycosylation of Asn350 for full enzymatic function.

The optimal pH range for HYAL1 function is 4.0 to 4.3, though HYAL1 is still 50-80% active at pH 4.5.

== Disease Relevance ==
HYAL1 is implicated in several types of cancers, likely due to the angiogenic effects of HYAL1-cleaved hyaluronan fragments. In bladder, prostate, and head and neck carcinomas, elevated hyaluronan and HYAL1 levels are found in tumor cells, tissues, and related body fluids (e.g. urine for bladder cancer and saliva for head and neck cancer). Urinary hyaluronan and hyaluronidase levels, measured by the HA-HAase test, have ~88% accuracy in detecting bladder cancer, regardless of the tumor grade and stage.

In breast cancer, HYAL1 is also overexpressed in cell lines MDA-MB-231 and MCF-7 and invasive duct cancer tissues and metastatic lymph nodes. Higher HYAL1 expression has also been detected in primary tumor tissue from patients with subsequent brain metastases versus those without.

== See also ==
- Hyaluronidase deficiency
