= Skin fragility-woolly hair-palmoplantar keratoderma syndrome =

Skin fragility-woolly hair-palmoplantar keratoderma
- Specialty: Medical genetics
- Prevention: none
- Frequency: very rare, only 2 cases have been described in medical literature
- Deaths: -

Skin fragility-woolly hair-palmoplantar keratoderma syndrome is a very rare genetic disorder which is characterized by fragile skin which shows itself as blisters and erosion due to trauma that wouldn't typically cause those type of lesions, woolly hair with alopecia, nail dysplasia, widespread or local palmoplantar keratoderma associated with painful fissuring. Only 2 cases from two families have been described in medical literature.

== Genetics ==
Through the only two described patients, this disorder was found to be caused by homozygous or compound heterozygous mutations in the desmoplakin gene, in chromosome 6.

== Etiology ==
It was first discovered in 2002 by Whittock et al. when they described 2 un-related patients with the symptoms mentioned above.
