= Hyaluronidase deficiency =

- Other names: Mucopolysaccharidosis type IX
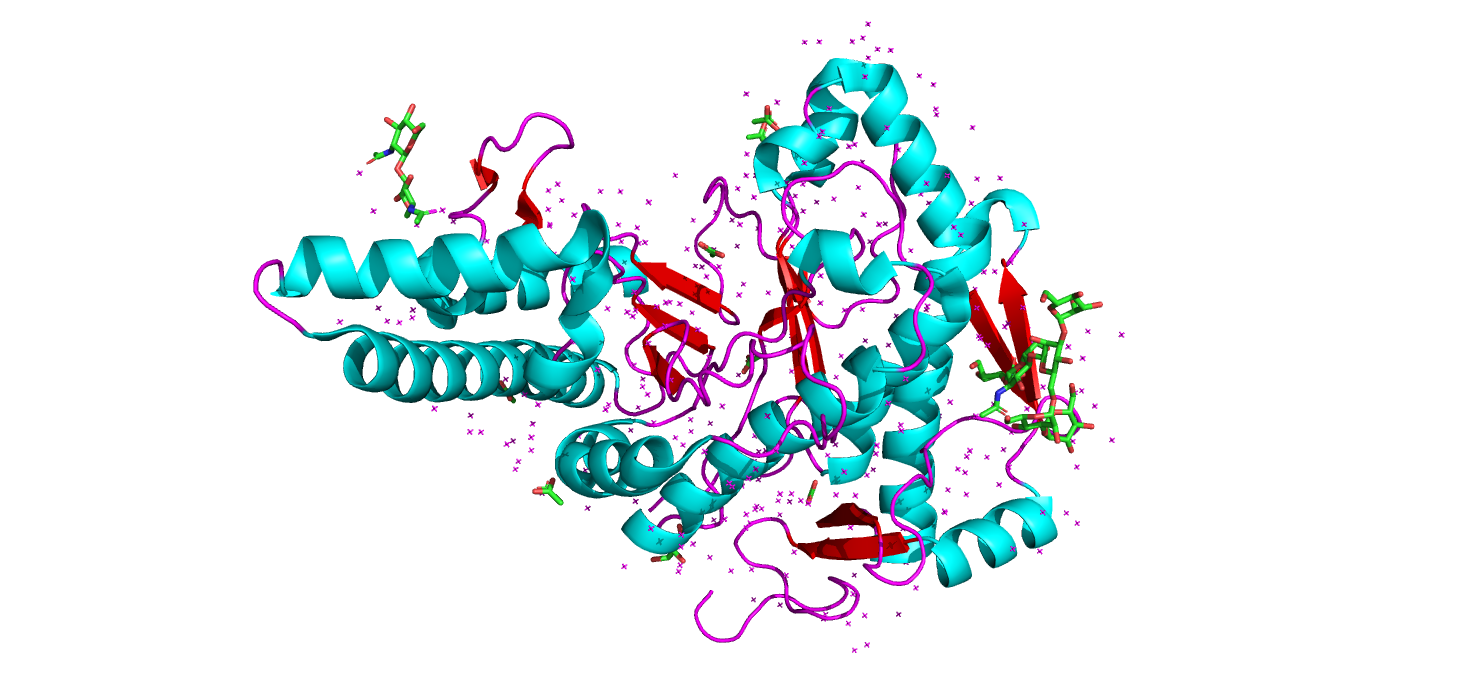
- Specialty: Dermatology
- Symptoms: short stature, mildly dysmorphic facial features, soft tissue masses, knee and hip pain
- Usual onset: Childhood
- Causes: Deficiency of the enzyme hyaluronidase
- Frequency: less than 1 in 1,000,000

Hyaluronidase deficiency, also known as Mucopolysaccharidosis type IX or MPS IX, is a condition caused by mutations in the HYAL1 gene, and is characterized by multiple soft-tissue masses.

== Signs and symptoms ==
As hyaluronidase deficiency is an extremely rare disorder, a clear clinical picture of the disease has not been formed. However, the following symptoms may occur:

- Multiple soft tissue masses which may experience temporary episodes of painful swelling.
- Temporary episodes of generalized cutaneous swelling.
- Frequent episodes of otitis media.
- Short stature.
- Mildy dysmorphic facial features such as a flattened nasal bridge, a bifid (split) uvula, and a submucosal cleft palate.
- Joint movement and intellectual ability are unaffected.

== Diagnosis ==
It is diagnosed through a combination of a thorough clinical evaluation in which characteristic findings are identified, specialized tests that can detect things like excessive levels of mucopolysaccharides and enzym essays to see if there is a deficiency in the enzyme hyaluronidase.

== Treatment ==
At the moment, there are no effective treatments against hyaluronidase deficiency. The only treatment possible is symptomatic and meant to manage and alleviate individual symptoms.

== See also ==
- Morquio syndrome
- Hunter syndrome
- Hurler syndrome
- Skin lesion
