= PRICKLE1 =

Protein-coding gene in the species Homo sapiens

Identifiers
- Aliases: PRICKLE1, EPM1B, RILP, prickle planar cell polarity protein 1
- External IDs: OMIM: 608500; MGI: 1916034; GeneCards: PRICKLE1

Gene location (Human)
| Chr. | Chromosome 12 (human) |
| Band | 12q12 | Start | 42,456,757 bp |
| Band | 12q12 | End | 42,590,355 bp |

Gene location (Mouse)
| Chr. | Chromosome 15 (mouse) |
| Band | 15|15 E3 | Start | 93,396,995 bp |
| Band | 15|15 E3 | End | 93,493,772 bp |
RNA expression pattern
| Bgee | Human / Mouse (ortholog); Top expressed in: buccal mucosa cell; tendon of biceps brachii; lateral nuclear group of thalamus; spinal ganglia; endothelial cell; trigeminal ganglion; myocardium of left ventricle; parietal pleura; internal globus pallidus; cardiac muscle tissue of right atrium / Top expressed in: digit; phalanx of foot; zygote; secondary oocyte; phalanx of second toe; phalanx of fourth toe; middle finger; primary oocyte; phalanx of big toe; phalanx of middle finger; More reference expression data |
| BioGPS | n/a |
Gene ontology
| Molecular function | zinc ion binding; metal ion binding; protein binding |
| Cellular component | nuclear membrane; nucleus; membrane; cytoplasm; cytosol |
| Biological process | negative regulation of canonical Wnt signaling pathway; positive regulation of protein ubiquitination; coronary vasculature development; positive regulation of proteasomal ubiquitin-dependent protein catabolic process; neural tube closure; aorta development; negative regulation of cardiac muscle cell myoblast differentiation; negative regulation of transcription, DNA-templated; Wnt signaling pathway, planar cell polarity pathway; protein import into nucleus |
Sources:Amigo / QuickGO
Orthologs
| Databases | NCBI: entry; OMA: entry |
| Species | Human | Mouse |
| Entrez | 144165 | 106042 |
| Ensembl | ENSG00000139174 | ENSMUSG00000036158 |
| UniProt | Q96MT3 | Q3U5C7 |
| RefSeq (mRNA) | NM_001144881; NM_001144882; NM_001144883; NM_153026 | NM_001033217; NM_001364846 |
| RefSeq (protein) | NP_001138353; NP_001138354; NP_001138355; NP_694571 | NP_001028389; NP_001351775 |
| Location (UCSC) | Chr 12: 42.46 – 42.59 Mb | Chr 15: 93.4 – 93.49 Mb |
| PubMed search |
- Wikidata
| View/Edit Human | View/Edit Mouse |

Prickle planar cell polarity protein 1 is a protein that in humans is encoded by the PRICKLE1 gene.

== Function ==
This gene encodes a nuclear receptor that may be a negative regulator of the Wnt/beta-catenin signaling pathway. The encoded protein localizes to the nuclear membrane and has been implicated in the nuclear trafficking of the transcription repressors REST/NRSF and REST4. Mutations in this gene have been linked to PRICKLE1-related progressive myoclonus epilepsy and autism. Alternate splicing results in multiple transcript variants. A pseudogene of this gene is found on chromosome 3.
