= Camptodactyly, tall stature, and hearing loss syndrome =

Camptodactyly-tall stature-hearing loss syndrome
- Other names: CATSHL syndrome
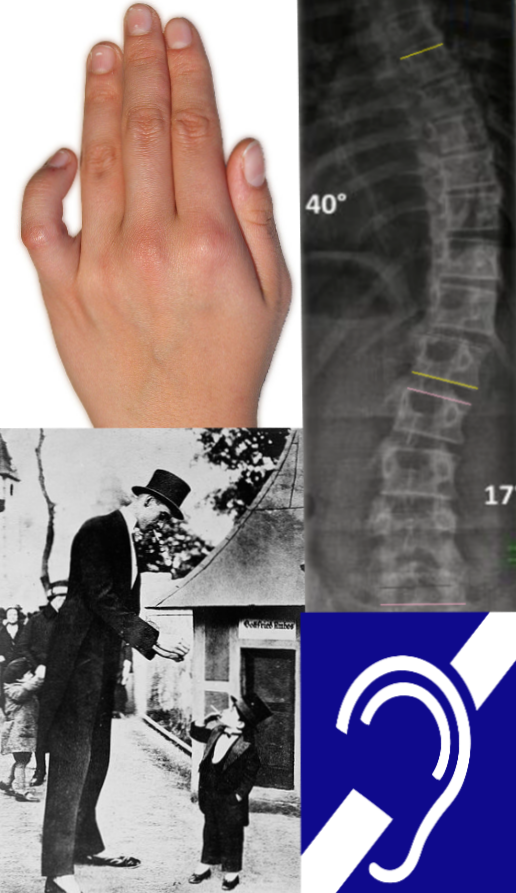
- Specialty: Medical genetics
- Symptoms: camptodactyly, hearing loss and tall height
- Complications: hearing impairment
- Usual onset: birth
- Duration: life-long
- Causes: Genetic mutation
- Diagnostic method: physical examination, genetic testing
- Prevention: none
- Prognosis: good
- Frequency: very rare, only 30 cases have been documented in medical literature

Camptodactyly, tall stature, and hearing loss syndrome, also known as CATSHL syndrome, is a rare genetic disorder which consists of camptodactyly, tall height, scoliosis, and hearing loss. Occasionally, developmental delay and intellectual disabilities are reported. About 30 (live) people with the disorder have been recorded in medical literature to date (May 2022); 27 people from a four-generation Utah family and 2 brothers from consanguineous Egyptian parents. This disorder is caused by autosomal dominant (rarely recessive) missense mutations in the FGFR3 gene.

== Symptoms ==
The main symptoms of this disease are:

- Lower limb joint abnormality
- Camptodactyly
- Hearing loss
- Scoliosis
- Tall stature

Occasionally:

- Intellectual disability and developmental delay

== Cause ==
CASTHL syndrome is caused by a dominant loss-of-function missense mutation of FGFR3 gene.

It is known that FGFR3 negatively regulates bone growth through negative regulation of endochondral ossification mechanism. In this disease this mechanism is disrupted.

== Diagnosis ==
CATSHL syndrome diagnosis can be suspected by phenotype, subsequently diagnosis can be confirmed by genetic testing.

== Treatment ==
This disease doesn’t have a cure, although symptomatic management is available.

== Prognosis ==
Prognosis is good, because death cases because of that disease hadn’t been identified.

== History ==
The mutation in mice that causes CATSHL-like symptoms was described by Colvin et al in 1996. First human cases have been reported by Toydemir et al in 2006 in a large Utah family.

== Prevalence ==
The frequency of that disease is unknown, although 30 cases have been recorded.
