= ALS2 =

Protein-coding gene in humans

Identifiers
- Aliases: ALS2, ALS2CR6, ALSJ, IAHSP, PLSJ, alsin Rho guanine nucleotide exchange factor, alsin Rho guanine nucleotide exchange factor ALS2
- External IDs: OMIM: 606352; MGI: 1921268; GeneCards: ALS2

Gene location (Human)
Chr.	Chromosome 2 (human)
Band	2q33.1	Start	201,700,267 bp
Band	2q33.1	End	201,782,112 bp

Gene location (Mouse)
Chr.	Chromosome 1 (mouse)
Band	1|1 C1.3	Start	59,202,085 bp
Band	1|1 C1.3	End	59,276,390 bp
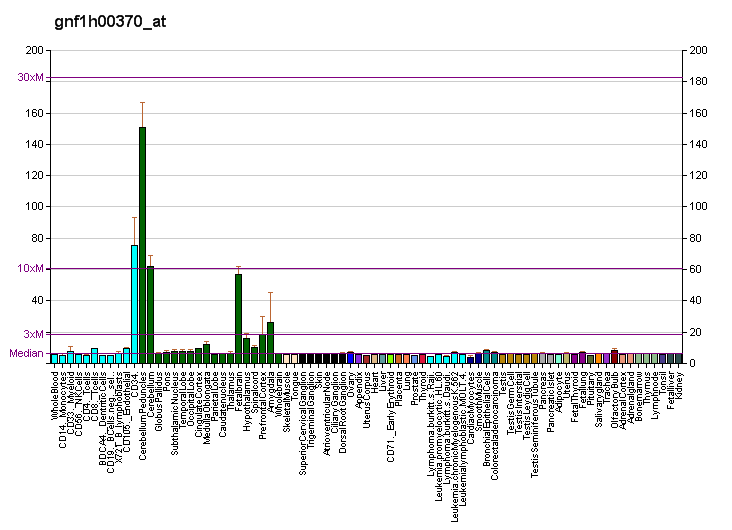
RNA expression pattern
Bgee	Human / Mouse (ortholog); Top expressed in: cerebellum; cerebellar cortex; cerebellar hemisphere; right hemisphere of cerebellum; cerebellar vermis; tibialis anterior muscle; myocardium of left ventricle; cardiac muscle tissue of right atrium; deltoid muscle; sural nerve / Top expressed in: neural layer of retina; dentate gyrus of hippocampal formation granule cell; cerebellar cortex; morula; zygote; muscle of thigh; right kidney; ventricular zone; yolk sac; primary visual cortex; More reference expression data
BioGPS	More reference expression data
Gene ontology
Molecular function	protein homodimerization activity; guanyl-nucleotide exchange factor activity; protein serine/threonine kinase activator activity; protein binding
Cellular component	cytoplasm; vesicle; centrosome; membrane; postsynaptic density; intracellular membrane-bounded organelle; growth cone; ruffle; dendritic spine; axon; soma; dendrite; early endosome; neuron projection; lamellipodium; cytosol; protein-containing complex
Biological process	protein localization; neuron projection morphogenesis; synaptic transmission, glutamatergic; axonogenesis; locomotory behavior; vesicle organization; regulation of GTPase activity; cell death; in utero embryonic development; behavioral fear response; response to oxidative stress; endosome organization; endosomal transport; positive regulation of GTPase activity; receptor recycling; neuromuscular junction development; Rac protein signal transduction; regulation of Rho protein signal transduction; regulation of endosome size; positive regulation of Rac protein signal transduction; positive regulation of protein kinase activity; positive regulation of protein serine/threonine kinase activity
Sources:Amigo / QuickGO
Orthologs
Databases	NCBI: entry; OMA: entry
Species	Human	Mouse
Entrez	57679	74018
Ensembl	ENSG00000003393	ENSMUSG00000026024
UniProt	Q96Q42	Q920R0
RefSeq (mRNA)	NM_001135745; NM_020919	NM_001159948; NM_028717; NM_146109
RefSeq (protein)	NP_001129217; NP_065970	NP_001153420; NP_082993; NP_666221
Location (UCSC)	Chr 2: 201.7 – 201.78 Mb	Chr 1: 59.2 – 59.28 Mb
PubMed search
- Wikidata
View/Edit Human	View/Edit Mouse

Alsin is a protein that in humans is encoded by the ALS2 gene. ALS2 orthologs have been identified in all mammals for which complete genome data are available.

== See also ==
- Juvenile primary lateral sclerosis
- Amyotrophic lateral sclerosis
