= PRICKLE1-related progressive myoclonus epilepsy with ataxia =

- Other names: Progressive myoclonus epilepsy-ataxia syndrome
- Specialty: Medical genetics
- Symptoms: Myoclonus, epilepsy, and ataxia
- Usual onset: Mid/late childhood
- Duration: Lifelong
- Causes: Genetic mutation
- Prevention: None
- Prognosis: Medium
- Frequency: very rare, only 17 cases from families across Western Asia and the Middle East have been described in medical literature
- Deaths: -

PRICKLE1-related progressive myoclonus epilepsy with ataxia is a very rare genetic disorder which is characterized by myoclonic epilepsy and ataxia.

== Signs and symptoms ==
Ataxia is usually one of the first symptoms of this disorder, followed by early/mid childhood-onset myoclonus, which can lead to dysarthria, and mid/late childhood-onset epilepsy. It is more common for the epileptic grand-mal seizures to begin at night. This is one of few genetic disorders which do not affect the intellect of the person afflicted by it.

== Causes ==
As its name suggests, this disorder is caused by mutations (usually a point one) of the PRICKLE1 gene, in chromosome 12. This gene produces a protein called "prickle homolog 1" which is thought (but not certainly known) to be essential in brain development. These mutations are inherited either by autosomal recessive or autosomal dominant inheritance.

== Treatment ==
This condition is usually managed with occupational therapy, physical therapy, and speech therapy, anti-seizure medications, and adaptive devices.

== Epidemiology ==
According to OMIM, only 17 cases from families in the Middle East and Western Asia (more specifically, Saudi Arabia and Jordan).
