= Infantile cerebral and cerebellar atrophy with postnatal progressive microcephaly =

- Specialty: Medical genetics
- Prevention: None
- Frequency: Higher among Jewish families in Caucasus, Israel
- Deaths: -

Infantile cerebral and cerebellar atrophy with postnatal progressive microcephaly is a rare hereditary autosomal recessive malformation syndrome of the central nervous system characterized by profound motor delays and intellectual disabilities, progressive microcephaly, hypertonia, spasticity, clonus and epilepsy. MRI findings include severe cerebellar and cerebral deterioration (atrophy) and impaired myelination. This condition is an example of consequences from the Founder effect, especially that of Jewish populations.

It has been described in 5 infants from 4 Israeli families of ethnic Caucasus Jewish descent. The genetic cause was found to be a homozygous mutation of the MED17 gene, located in chromosome 11, this mutation is called L371P.

In vitro functional expression assays of the L371P mutation showed that it results in a functionally inactive MED17 protein.
