= Mitochondrial thiamine pyrophosphate carrier =

Protein-coding gene in the species Homo sapiens

SLC25A19

Identifiers
- Aliases: SLC25A19, DNC, MCPHA, MUP1, THMD3, THMD4, TPC, solute carrier family 25 member 19
- External IDs: OMIM: 606521; MGI: 1914533; GeneCards: SLC25A19

Gene location (Human)
Chr.	Chromosome 17 (human)
Band	17q25.1	Start	75,272,981 bp
Band	17q25.1	End	75,289,510 bp

Gene location (Mouse)
Chr.	Chromosome 11 (mouse)
Band	11|11 E2	Start	115,505,004 bp
Band	11|11 E2	End	115,519,121 bp
RNA expression pattern
Bgee	Human / Mouse (ortholog); Top expressed in: left testis; right testis; stromal cell of endometrium; right adrenal cortex; left adrenal cortex; appendix; granulocyte; mucosa of transverse colon; apex of heart; lymph node / Top expressed in: neural layer of retina; right kidney; brown adipose tissue; saccule; temporal muscle; muscle of thigh; proximal tubule; superior frontal gyrus; primary visual cortex; sternocleidomastoid muscle; More reference expression data
BioGPS	n/a
Gene ontology
Molecular function	deoxynucleotide transmembrane transporter activity; thiamine pyrophosphate transmembrane transporter activity; thiamine transmembrane transporter activity; transmembrane transporter activity
Cellular component	integral component of membrane; nucleus; mitochondrion; membrane; mitochondrial inner membrane; integral component of mitochondrial inner membrane
Biological process	deoxynucleotide transport; transmembrane transport; thiamine-containing compound metabolic process; mitochondrial transport; thiamine pyrophosphate transmembrane transport; thiamine transmembrane transport; transport
Sources:Amigo / QuickGO
Orthologs
Databases	NCBI: entry; OMA: entry
Species	Human	Mouse
Entrez	60386	67283
Ensembl	ENSG00000125454	ENSMUSG00000020744
UniProt	Q9HC21	Q9DAM5
RefSeq (mRNA)	NM_001126121; NM_001126122; NM_021734	NM_001252384; NM_001252394; NM_001252395; NM_001252396; NM_026071
RefSeq (protein)	NP_001119593; NP_001119594; NP_068380	NP_001239313; NP_001239323; NP_001239324; NP_001239325; NP_080347
Location (UCSC)	Chr 17: 75.27 – 75.29 Mb	Chr 11: 115.51 – 115.52 Mb
PubMed search
- Wikidata
View/Edit Human	View/Edit Mouse

Mitochondrial thiamine pyrophosphate carrier is a protein that in humans is encoded by the SLC25A19 gene.

== Clinical significance ==
Mutations in the SLC25A19 gene are responsible for amish lethal microcephaly.

== See also ==
- Solute carrier family
