= MMACHC =

Protein found in humans

Identifiers
- Aliases: MMACHC, cblC, methylmalonic aciduria (cobalamin deficiency) cblC type, with homocystinuria, metabolism of cobalamin associated C
- External IDs: OMIM: 609831; MGI: 1914346; GeneCards: MMACHC
Available structures
PDB	Ortholog search: PDBe RCSB
PDB	List of PDB id codes 3SBY, 3SBZ, 3SC0, 3SOM
Enzyme activity
EC #	BRENDA	ExPASy	KEGG	MetaCyc
1.16.1.6	↗	↗	↗	↗
2.5.1.151	↗	↗	↗	↗

Gene location (Human)
Chr.	Chromosome 1 (human)
Band	1p34.1	Start	45,500,300 bp
Band	1p34.1	End	45,513,382 bp

Gene location (Mouse)
Chr.	Chromosome 4 (mouse)
Band	4|4 D1	Start	116,559,476 bp
Band	4|4 D1	End	116,565,603 bp
RNA expression pattern
Bgee	Human / Mouse (ortholog); Top expressed in: right lobe of liver; muscle of thigh; stromal cell of endometrium; ventricular zone; mucosa of transverse colon; testicle; right auricle of heart; left ventricle; prefrontal cortex; right adrenal gland / Top expressed in: myocardium of ventricle; sternocleidomastoid muscle; soleus muscle; digastric muscle; temporal muscle; tibialis anterior muscle; triceps brachii muscle; vastus lateralis muscle; extraocular muscle; gastrocnemius muscle; More reference expression data
BioGPS	n/a
Gene ontology
Molecular function	cobalamin binding; protein binding; FAD binding; demethylase activity; protein homodimerization activity; glutathione binding; cyanocobalamin reductase (cyanide-eliminating) activity; oxidoreductase activity
Cellular component	cytosol; cytoplasm
Biological process	demethylation; glutathione metabolic process; cobalamin biosynthetic process; cobalamin metabolic process
Sources:Amigo / QuickGO
Orthologs
Databases	NCBI: entry; OMA: entry
Species	Human	Mouse
Entrez	25974	67096
Ensembl	ENSG00000132763	ENSMUSG00000028690
UniProt	Q9Y4U1	Q9CZD0
RefSeq (mRNA)	NM_015506; NM_001330540	NM_025962
RefSeq (protein)	NP_001317469; NP_056321	NP_080238
Location (UCSC)	Chr 1: 45.5 – 45.51 Mb	Chr 4: 116.56 – 116.57 Mb
PubMed search
- Wikidata
View/Edit Human	View/Edit Mouse

Methylmalonic aciduria and homocystinuria type C protein (MMACHC) is a protein that in humans is encoded by the MMACHC gene.

== Function ==
The C-terminal region of the product of the MMACHC gene is similar to TonB, a bacterial protein involved in energy transduction for cobalamin uptake. The MMACHC gene product catalyzes the decyanation of cyanocobalamin as well as the dealkylation of alkylcobalamins including methylcobalamin and adenosylcobalamin. The MMACHC gene product is characterised as a cyanocobalamin reductase (cyanide-eliminating) and a alkylcobalamin reductase. It enables the interconversion of cyano- and alkylcobalamins.

== Clinical significance ==
Mutations are associated with combined homocystinuria and methylmalonic acidemia.
