= Juvenile-onset dystonia =

- Specialty: Medical genetics
- Symptoms: dystonia starting in late childhood-early teenage years
- Complications: Premature death is seen in some people with the disorder
- Usual onset: Late childhood-early adolescence
- Duration: Life-long
- Causes: Genetic mutation
- Risk factors: Having a parent with the disorder
- Diagnostic method: Physical evaluation
- Differential diagnosis: dystonia
- Prevention: none
- Treatment: Physical therapy
- Prognosis: Ok
- Frequency: Rare

Juvenile-onset dystonia is a disorder in which the muscles involuntarily contract, which in turn cause involuntary movements and rather abnormal postures. Symptoms of this disorder vary among the people who have it. In every patient, these symptoms start between the late-childhood or early adolescence of the people with the disorder (hence juvenile-onset). In most people with this disorder, the cause is unknown. It is a type of dystonia.

== Etymology ==
This disorder was first discovered by Marla Gearing et al., when she described pair of male twins which presented developmental delays of mild severity from birth, then started presenting symptoms of progressive dystonia at the age of 12 years old. One of the twins died at 21 years old and the other died at 22 years old. The exact prevalence of juvenile-onset dystonia is unknown, but at least 250,000 people in the United States are affected by dystonia itself (not necessarily the juvenile-onset form).

This disorder is at least partly genetic Autosomal dominant mutations in the ACTB gene sometimes are the underlying cause of familial cases of juvenile-onset dystonia. Another gene associated with the disorder is IMPDH2.
