= Familial episodic pain syndrome =

- Other names: FEPS
- Specialty: Medical genetics, Neurology
- Symptoms: Intense episodic pain occurring within people of the same families.
- Complications: Walking impairment.
- Usual onset: Depends on the type
- Types: FEPS type 1, 2 and 3.
- Causes: Autosomal dominant genetic mutation
- Prevention: None
- Treatment: Analgesics, anti-inflammatory medication.
- Prognosis: Medium
- Frequency: very rare, around 16 families have been described in medical literature.
- Deaths: -

Familial episodic pain syndrome, also known simply as FEPS, is a group of rare genetic peripheral neuropathies which are characterized by recurrent random episodes of intense pain which occur most often in the upper or lower parts of the body occurring in several members of the same family. They are often triggered by cold temperatures, physical exercise, fatigue, etc. It may or may not get better with age.

== Types ==
This disorder is distributed into three types:

=== FEPS Type 1 ===
This type of familial episodic pain syndrome is characterized by infancy-onset intense and debilitating upper-body episodic pain. It's caused by mutations in the TRPA1 gene, in chromosome 8. It was first described in 2010 by Kremeyer et al. in 21 affected members from a large 4-generation Colombian family. Transmission is autosomal dominant.

=== FEPS Type 2 ===
This type of familial episodic pain syndrome is characterized by adult-onset episodic paroxysmal pain in the distal lower limbs (feet). It's caused by mutations in the SCN10A gene, in chromosome 3. It was first described in 2012 by Faber et al in a 2-generation family (a man and his son), the proband developed episodic burning, intense pain in his feet at the age of 57 while his son developed it at the age of 39. Transmission is autosomal dominant.

=== FEPS Type 3 ===
This type of familial episodic pain syndrome is characterized by childhood-onset intense episodic pain on the lower and sometimes upper extremities, this pain typically lasts days and can be treated with anti-inflammatory medication, the pain episodes tend to lower in severity with age. It is caused by mutations in the SCN11A gene, in chromosome 3. It has been described in 13 and 10 members from two large Chinese families and 12 un-related patients. Transmission is autosomal dominant.
