= Sphingosine phosphate lyase insufficiency syndrome =

- Other names: Renal Endocrine Neurologic and Immune syndrome, Nephrotic Syndrome type 14
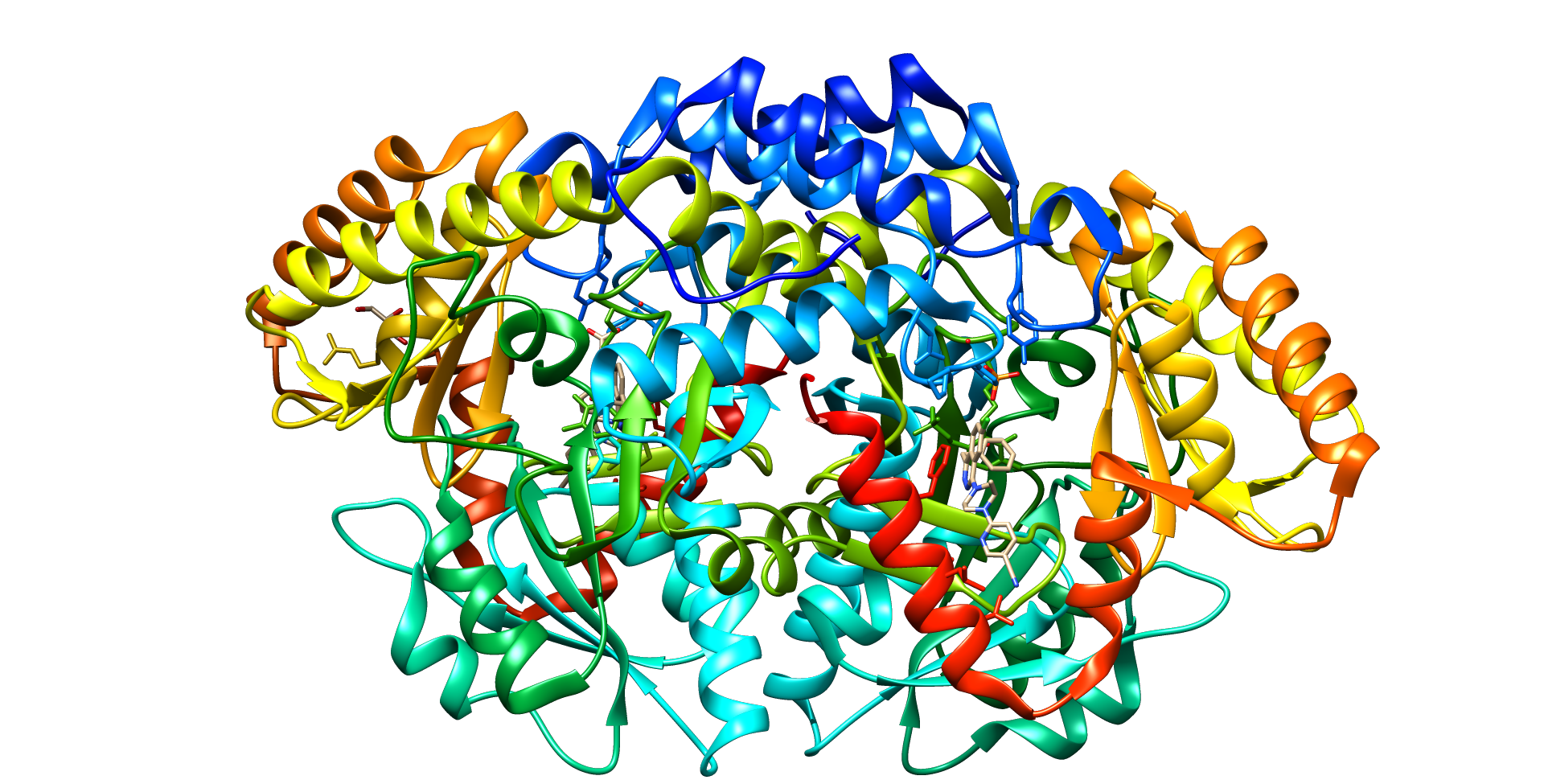
- Visualization of the SGPL1 protein.
- Specialty: Nephrology, endocrinology, neurology
- Symptoms: nephrotic syndrome, adrenal insufficiency,
- Complications: kidney failure
- Usual onset: childhood
- Duration: lifelong
- Causes: family history (genetics)
- Risk factors: family history (genetics)
- Diagnostic method: genetic testing
- Treatment: management to maintain function
- Prognosis: progressive
- Frequency: prevalence: 1 in 6,666,667

Sphingosine phosphate lyase insufficiency syndrome (SPLIS) is a rare autosomal recessive disorder caused by mutations in the SGPL1 gene located on human chromosome 10. It is also known as Renal, Endocrine, Neurologic and Imune Syndrome (RENI), or Nephrotic Syndrome, type 14 (NPHS14).

== Signs and symptoms ==
This disease can cause a variety of symptoms, including steroid-resistant nephrotic syndrome, endocrine deficiency (particularly adrenal insufficiency), neurological deficiency, immunodeficiency, skin manifestations, and failure to thrive.

== History ==
Sphingosine phosphate lyase deficiency was first identified in 2017 through genetic sequencing of several patients. A scientific study published in 2024 identified 76 cases diagnosed historically, including 31 in the year the disease was identified. With an estimated prevalence of 0.015 per 100,000, 11,000 to 12,000 people worldwide could be affected.

== Causes and genetics ==
Sphingosine-1-phosphate lyase is an enzyme required for the catabolism of sphingosine-1-phosphate, a cell signaling molecule. Various pathogenic variants in the gene encoding this enzyme result in a more or less severe deficiency of the enzyme, leading to an accumulation of sphingosine at the cellular level. This accumulation leads to biological dysfunction.

== Treatment and management ==
In 2025, treatment is primarily symptomatic, with hormone replacement therapy in cases of adrenal insufficiency, and dialysis or transplant in cases of kidney failure. Gene therapy is an avenue of research. For certain variants that produce a poorly functional enzyme, vitamin B6 supplementation may have an effect.

== See also ==
- Chromosome 10
- SGPL1
