= LMBRD1 =

Protein-coding gene in the species Homo sapiens

Identifiers
- Aliases: LMBRD1, C6orf209, LMBD1, MAHCF, NESI, LMBR1 domain containing 1
- External IDs: OMIM: 612625; MGI: 1915671; HomoloGene: 10156; GeneCards: LMBRD1; OMA:LMBRD1 - orthologs

Gene location (Human)
Chr.	Chromosome 6 (human)
Band	6q13	Start	69,672,757 bp
Band	6q13	End	69,867,236 bp

Gene location (Mouse)
Chr.	Chromosome 1 (mouse)
Band	1|1 A5	Start	24,717,711 bp
Band	1|1 A5	End	24,805,382 bp
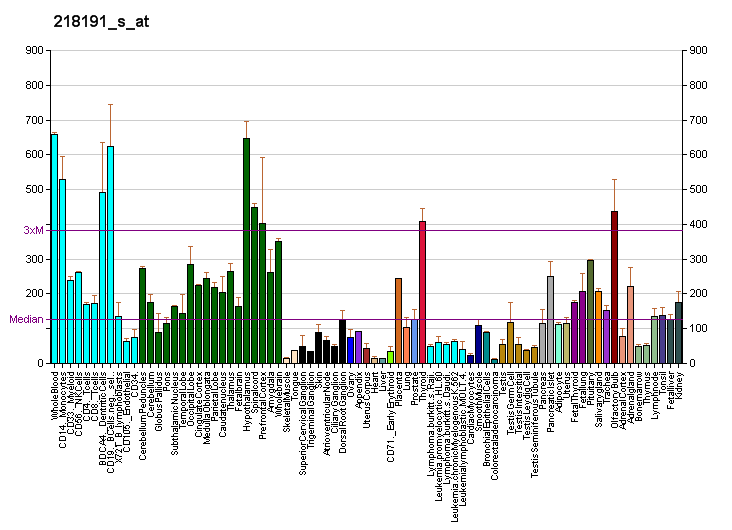
RNA expression pattern
Bgee	Human / Mouse (ortholog); Top expressed in: secondary oocyte; retinal pigment epithelium; islet of Langerhans; olfactory bulb; bronchial epithelial cell; corpus callosum; C1 segment; Epithelium of choroid plexus; skin of thigh; cerebellar vermis / Top expressed in: saccule; ectoderm; otic vesicle; otic placode; spermatid; Epithelium of choroid plexus; neural layer of retina; superior frontal gyrus; stroma of bone marrow; anterior horn of spinal cord; More reference expression data
BioGPS	More reference expression data
Gene ontology
Molecular function	cobalamin binding; insulin receptor binding; ABC-type vitamin B12 transporter activity
Cellular component	integral component of membrane; clathrin-coated endocytic vesicle; lysosomal membrane; plasma membrane; lysosome; membrane
Biological process	cobalamin metabolic process; insulin receptor internalization; negative regulation of glucose import; negative regulation of insulin receptor signaling pathway; negative regulation of protein kinase B signaling; viral process; cobalamin transport; transport
Sources:Amigo / QuickGO
Orthologs
Species	Human	Mouse
Entrez	55788	68421
Ensembl	ENSG00000168216	ENSMUSG00000073725
UniProt	Q9NUN5	Q8K0B2
RefSeq (mRNA)	NM_018368; NM_001363722; NM_001367271; NM_001367272	NM_026719; NM_001310483
RefSeq (protein)	NP_060838; NP_001350651	NP_001297412; NP_080995
Location (UCSC)	Chr 6: 69.67 – 69.87 Mb	Chr 1: 24.72 – 24.81 Mb
PubMed search
- Wikidata
View/Edit Human	View/Edit Mouse

Probable lysosomal cobalamin transporter is a protein that in humans is encoded by the LMBRD1 gene.
