= CCDC11 =

Protein-coding gene in humans

Coiled-Coil Domain Containing 11, also known as CCDC11, is a protein, that is encoded by CCDC11 gene located at chromosome 18 in humans.

== Overview ==
The CCDC11 gene is located on chromosome 18q21.1 and is made of 39303 BP. The CCDC11 protein is made of 514 amino acids and has a mass of 61835 Da. Its aliases include coiled-coil domain containing protein 11, FLJ32743, OTTHUMP00000163503.

== Homology ==
CCDC has orthologs all the way back to betaproteobacteria which is a class of Proteobacteria. The following table represents a small selection of orthologs found using searches in BLAST and BLAT. This is by no means a comprehensive list; however, it shows the diversity of species that CCDC11 is found.

Species	Organism Common Name	NCBI Accession	Length (AAs)	Sequence identity	Sequence similarity
Homo sapiens	Human	NP_659457	514	100%	100%
Pan troglodytes	Chimpanzee	XP_523923.3	514	99%	99%
Callithrix jacchus	Marmoset	XP_002757278.1	514	92%	95%
Ailuropoda melanoleuca	Panda	XP_002939158.1	514	83%	91%
Canis familiaris	Dog	XP_547689.3	514	82%	91%
Bos taurus	Cow	XP_002697813.1	514	81%	91%
Loxodonata africana	Elephant	XP_003406348.1	514	80%	91%
Rattus norvegicus	Rat	XP_001053914.2	514	71%	87%
Mus musculus	Mouse	NP_083224.2	514	70%	87%
Ornithorhynchus anatinus	Platypus	XP_001509001.2	465	49%	72%
Monodelphis domestica	Opossum	XP_001372850.2	507	47%	70%
Xenopus tropicalis	Frog	NP_001120281.1	516	39%	65%
Anolis carolinensis	Lizard	XP_003227331.1	514	37%	62%
Nematostella vectensis	Sea anemone	XP_001628275.1	440	36%	58%
Branchiostoma floridae	Lancelet	XP_002609924.1	528	35%	61%
Trichoplax adhaerens	Trichoplax	XP_002111027.1	514	33%	60%
Danio rerio	Zebra fish	NP_001038595.2	519	32%	58%
Amphimedon queenslandica	Sponge	XP_003389146.1	513	31%	60%

== Gene neighborhood ==
The below image from NCBI shows the gene neighborhood of CCDC11 on chromosome 18. CCDC11 has methyl-CPG binding domain protein 1, MBD1, upstream and myosin VB3, MYO5B, downstream. All CCDC11, MBD1 and MYO5B are oriented negatively. Note the close proximity between MBD1 and CCDC11.

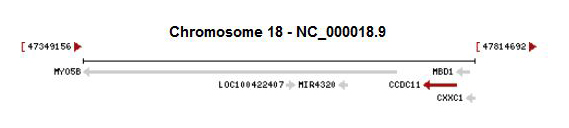

== Predicted Post-Translational Modification ==
Tools on the ExPASy Proteomics site predict the following post-translational modifications:

Tool	Predicted Modification	Homo sapiens	Mus musculus	Bos taurus
YinOYang	O-β-GlcNAc	T239, S510	T239	T239, S509, T510
NetPhos	phosphorylation	T8, T17, S43, S53, S56, S57, Y112, T134, S170, S240, S425, S461	T17, S43, S53, S56, S107, Y112, S114, S170, T284, S287, S492	T17, S56, T64, S107, T112, T122, T325, S442, S482, S507

One tool on the ExPASy, iPSORT, showed no signal peptide;however, it indicated CCDC11 to be mitochondrial. Another tool on the ExPASy, SOSUI, indicated the protein to be a soluble protein.
