= FOXE3 =

Protein found in humans

Identifiers
- Aliases: FOXE3, FKHL12, FREAC8, forkhead box E3, AAT11, ASGD2, CTRCT34
- External IDs: OMIM: 601094; MGI: 1353569; GeneCards: FOXE3

Gene location (Human)
Chr.	Chromosome 1 (human)
Band	1p33	Start	47,416,285 bp
Band	1p33	End	47,418,052 bp

Gene location (Mouse)
Chr.	Chromosome 4 (mouse)
Band	4 52.73 cM|4 D1	Start	114,782,344 bp
Band	4 52.73 cM|4 D1	End	114,783,210 bp
RNA expression pattern
Bgee	Human / Mouse (ortholog); Top expressed in: gonad; testicle; mucosa of transverse colon; tibial nerve; putamen; cerebellar cortex; cerebellar hemisphere; right hemisphere of cerebellum; kidney; left testis / Top expressed in: lens placode; subcapsular lens epithelium; neural groove; surface ectoderm; pharynx; spinal ganglia; neural layer of retina; peripheral nervous system; spinal cord; medulla oblongata; More reference expression data
BioGPS	n/a
Gene ontology
Molecular function	DNA binding; sequence-specific DNA binding; DNA-binding transcription factor activity; DNA-binding transcription factor activity, RNA polymerase II-specific
Cellular component	transcription regulator complex; nucleus
Biological process	positive regulation of lens epithelial cell proliferation; regulation of transcription, DNA-templated; negative regulation of lens fiber cell differentiation; cell development; positive regulation of epithelial cell proliferation; iris morphogenesis; cornea development in camera-type eye; negative regulation of apoptotic process; ciliary body morphogenesis; transcription by RNA polymerase II; transcription, DNA-templated; trabecular meshwork development; camera-type eye development; regulation of transcription by RNA polymerase II; eye development; lens development in camera-type eye; mRNA transcription by RNA polymerase II; anatomical structure morphogenesis; cell differentiation
Sources:Amigo / QuickGO
Orthologs
Databases	NCBI: entry; OMA: entry
Species	Human	Mouse
Entrez	2301	30923
Ensembl	ENSG00000186790	ENSMUSG00000044518
UniProt	Q13461	Q9QY14
RefSeq (mRNA)	NM_012186	NM_015758
RefSeq (protein)	NP_036318	NP_056573
Location (UCSC)	Chr 1: 47.42 – 47.42 Mb	Chr 4: 114.78 – 114.78 Mb
PubMed search
- Wikidata
View/Edit Human	View/Edit Mouse

Forkhead box protein E3 (FOXE3) also known as forkhead-related transcription factor 8 (FREAC-8) is a protein that in humans is encoded by the FOXE3 gene located on the short arm of chromosome 1.

== Function ==
FOXE3 is a forkhead-box transcription factor which is involved in the proper formation of the ocular lens and is post-natally expressed in the lens epithelium.

== Development ==
Foxe3, also known as Forkhead Box E3, is a transcription factor that is responsible for the formation of the lens placode, a precursor to the lens of the eye, and the lens itself. Foxe3 controls multiple processes during development of the lens including, the expression of Cryaα which controls the solubility of the crystalline protein complex in the developing lens. Reduced solubility can lead to potential cataract formation due to crystallization of the lens. Foxe3 also controls the regulation of Prox1, which is responsible for cell cycle progression. As Foxe3 expression downregulates, Prox1 expression increases causing a reduction in cellular proliferation in the anterior lens. Foxe3 also regulates platelet-derived growth factor receptor-α (Pdgfrα) expression. This is responsible for lens fiber differentiation within the epithelium of certain parts of the lens. There are multiple defects associated with dysfunction of this gene with most being classified under the term anterior segment dysgenesis (ASD). For example, Peters anomaly is a rare disorder obtained during development characterized by adhesions due to malformations of the posterior corneal stroma, the absence of Descemet's membrane and the corneal endothelium, and corneal opacities. This syndrome can be attributed to fetal alcohol syndrome and aneuploidy. Scientists have generated a knockout model for Foxe3 in mice and are testing the effects on the lenses of those animals. So far, it appears that Foxe3 is essential for normal lens development.

== Clinical significance ==
Mutations in the FOXE3 gene are associated with anterior segment mesenchymal dysgenesis.

Homozygous mutations in this gene have been associated with a number of ocular diseases such as congenital aphakia, sclerocornea, microphthalmia, and optic disc coloboma. There have also been reports of heterozygous mutations causing less severe ocular diseases such as anterior segment dysgenesis (sometimes referred to as anterior segment mesenchymal dysgenesis), and Peter's anomaly.

== See also ==
- FOX proteins
