= Juvenile primary lateral sclerosis =

- Other names: JPLS
- Juvenile primary lateral sclerosis has an autosomal recessive pattern of inheritance, meaning both copies of the gene in each cell are altered.

Juvenile primary lateral sclerosis (JPLS) also known as primary lateral sclerosis, juvenile (PLSJ), is a very rare genetic disorder, with a small number of reported cases, characterized by progressive weakness and stiffness of muscles in the arms, legs, and face. The disorder damages motor neurons, which are specialized nerve cells in the brain and spinal cord that control muscle movement.

== Symptoms and signs ==
Symptoms of JPLS begin in early childhood and progress over a period of 15 to 20 years. Early symptoms include clumsiness, muscle spasms, weakness and stiffness in the legs, and difficulty with balance. As symptoms progress, they become more serious and include weakness and stiffness in the arms and hands, slurred speech, drooling, difficulty swallowing, and an inability to walk.

== Genetics ==
Juvenile primary lateral sclerosis is inherited in an autosomal recessive pattern, which means two copies of the gene in each cell are altered. Most often, parents of affected individuals each carry one copy of the altered gene, but do not show any signs or symptoms.

Mutations in the ALS2 gene, found on chromosome two, are responsible for causing Juvenile primary lateral sclerosis. The ALS2 gene provides instructions for producing the protein alsin, which is widely expressed throughout the body tissues, but is especially concentrated in the motor neurons (specialized nerve cells) within the brain and spinal cord that control voluntary movement of the muscles.

When these cellular mechanisms are disrupted, the alsin protein becomes unstable and nonfunctional, impairing critical neuronal processes and leading to symptoms such as impaired balance, muscle weakness, and difficulties with speech production.

Alsin normally functions as a regulator of small GTPase proteins, which act as molecular switches involved in the placement of proteins and fats in the cell membrane, endocytosis (the transport of molecules from the cell membrane into the intercellular space), and the development of axons and dendrites that are essential for the transmission of nerve impulses.

It is currently unknown how the loss of functional alsin proteins causes the death of motor neurons and the symptoms of juvenile primary lateral sclerosis.

== Treatment ==
Treatment of ALS2-related disorders includes physical therapy and occupational therapy to promote mobility and independence and use of computer technologies and devices to facilitate writing and voice communication.

== See also ==
- List of genetic disorders
