= Weyer's ulnar ray/oligodactyly syndrome =

- Specialty: Medical genetics
- Symptoms: Ulnar ray deficit, heart, renal and splenic abnormalities and ectrodactyly
- Complications: Possible death (due to e.g. the cardiac and renal problems)
- Usual onset: Birth
- Duration: Life-long
- Causes: Genetic mutation
- Prevention: None
- Prognosis: Ok
- Frequency: Very rare. only 4 families known to carry the gene/be affected by the gene
- Deaths: -

Weyer's ulnar ray/oligodactyly syndrome is a rare multi-systemic genetic disorder which is characterized by ectrodactyly, ulnar, radial, or fibular ray deficit, and heart, single central incisor, splenic, and renal abnormalities. Cleft lip/palate and hypoplasia of the mandibles have also been observed. It is thought to be inherited in an autosomal recessive pattern. It was first discovered in 1957 by Weyers et al. Only four families worldwide are known to be affected by the disorder.
