= Global developmental delay =

Delayed development in children

Global developmental delay is an umbrella term used when children are significantly delayed in two or more areas of development. It can be diagnosed when a child is delayed in one or more milestones, categorised into motor skills, speech, cognitive skills, and social and emotional development. There is usually a specific condition which causes this delay, such as cerebral palsy, fragile X syndrome or other chromosomal abnormalities. However, it is sometimes difficult to identify this underlying condition.

Other terms associated with this condition are failure to thrive (which focuses on lack of weight gain and physical development), intellectual disability (which focuses on intellectual deficits and the changes they cause to development) and developmental disability (which can refer to both intellectual and physical disability altering development).

== Causes ==
Developmental delay can be caused by learning disabilities, in which case the delay can usually be overcome with time and support - such as with physiotherapists, occupational therapists, vision therapists, and speech and language therapists. Other causes which may cause a permanent delay in development include genetic disorders such as Down syndrome, fragile X syndrome and GLUT1 deficiency syndrome; childhood infections such as meningitis or encephalitis, and metabolic disorders such as hypothyroidism. Metabolic disorders are more likely to cause delayed development in older children, as many congenital metabolic problems which are easily managed are screened for in the neonatal period. Use of toxic substances in pregnancy, particularly alcohol, can lead to developmental delay if they affect the neurological development of the fetus, such as in fetal alcohol syndrome. Even though there are many known causes of delay, some children will never receive a diagnosis.

== Diagnosis ==
The DSM-5-TR makes a separate diagnosis of global developmental delay, reserved for children younger than 5 years who fail to meet expected developmental milestones 'in several areas of intellectual functioning'. It applies to individuals who are unable to undergo systematic assessments of intellectual functioning.

Developmental monitoring is performed during wellness visits to check a child's development. Health authorities encourage parents to monitor their child's development, the CDC's program "Learn the Signs. Act Early" provides materials for a child's development is assessed based on expected milestones for actions like how they play, learn, speak, act and move. Missed milestones may be cause for concern, so the doctor or another specialist may call for a more thorough test or exam to take a closer look, this is usually done by going through Developmental Screening.

Developmental Screening is a more involved process. The evaluating professional will ask a parent to complete a research-based questionnaire that asks about a child's development, including language, movement, thinking, behavior, and emotions. Developmental Screening is recommended by the American Academy of Pediatrics (AAP) to all children at 9, 18, and 30 months. The AAP also recommends that all children be screened specifically for autism spectrum disorder (ASD) during regular well-child visits at 18 and 24 months. If a Developmental Screening indicates a delay, the child should then be assessed with a Developmental Evaluation.

Developmental Evaluations are performed by a Developmental pediatrician, child psychologist, or other trained provider with the purpose of Identifying and diagnosing developmental delays and conditions.

- Chromosome microarray and karyotyping to look for trisomy, microdeletions, and duplications. It is the most sensitive diagnostic test available and is used first line in all cases, but can miss balanced translocations and low-level mosaicism.
- Specific gene testing is available for certain disorders such as Rett syndrome, although these are expensive tests which aren't widely available
- Selective metabolic investigations may be useful in the absence of other identifiable causes, and the specific tests done will depend on the presentation. Inborn errors of metabolism causing metabolic disorders are rare and there are limited treatment options even if they are successfully diagnosed.
- Targeted MRI brain can be considered second line in selected patients, and is more likely to contribute to a diagnosis if the child has abnormal physical signs such as microcephaly, macrocephaly, a change in head circumference, focal neurological signs, or epilepsy.

Neonatal screening is used in the UK (Guthrie test) and can diagnose certain inborn errors of metabolism before they cause significant developmental problems, with the aim to manage them so that no permanent damage occurs.

- Medium-chain acyl-CoA dehydrogenase deficiency
- Homocystinuria
- Congenital hypothyroidism
- Isovaleric acidemia
- Glutaricaciduria type 1
- Maple syrup urine disease

Canada, the US, and the Netherlands offer more extensive newborn screening, encompassing some other amino acid, organic, and urea cycle disorders.

== Management ==
The specific management of children with global developmental delay will depend on their individual needs and underlying diagnosis. Early intervention is essential to support the child to reach their full potential. Specialists involved in the management of GDD in children include:

- Speech therapists
- Physical therapists
- Orthotists
- Vision therapist
- Occupational therapists
- Music therapists
- Hearing specialists (Audiologist)
- Developmental paediatricians
- Neurologists
- Providers of Early Intervention Services (depending on location)

As well as involving professionals, parents can support the development of their child by playing with them, reading with them, showing them how to do tasks, and supporting them to participate in activities of daily living such as washing, dressing, and eating.

== See also ==
- Specific developmental disorder
