= X-linked intellectual disability =

- Other names: X-linked mental retardation
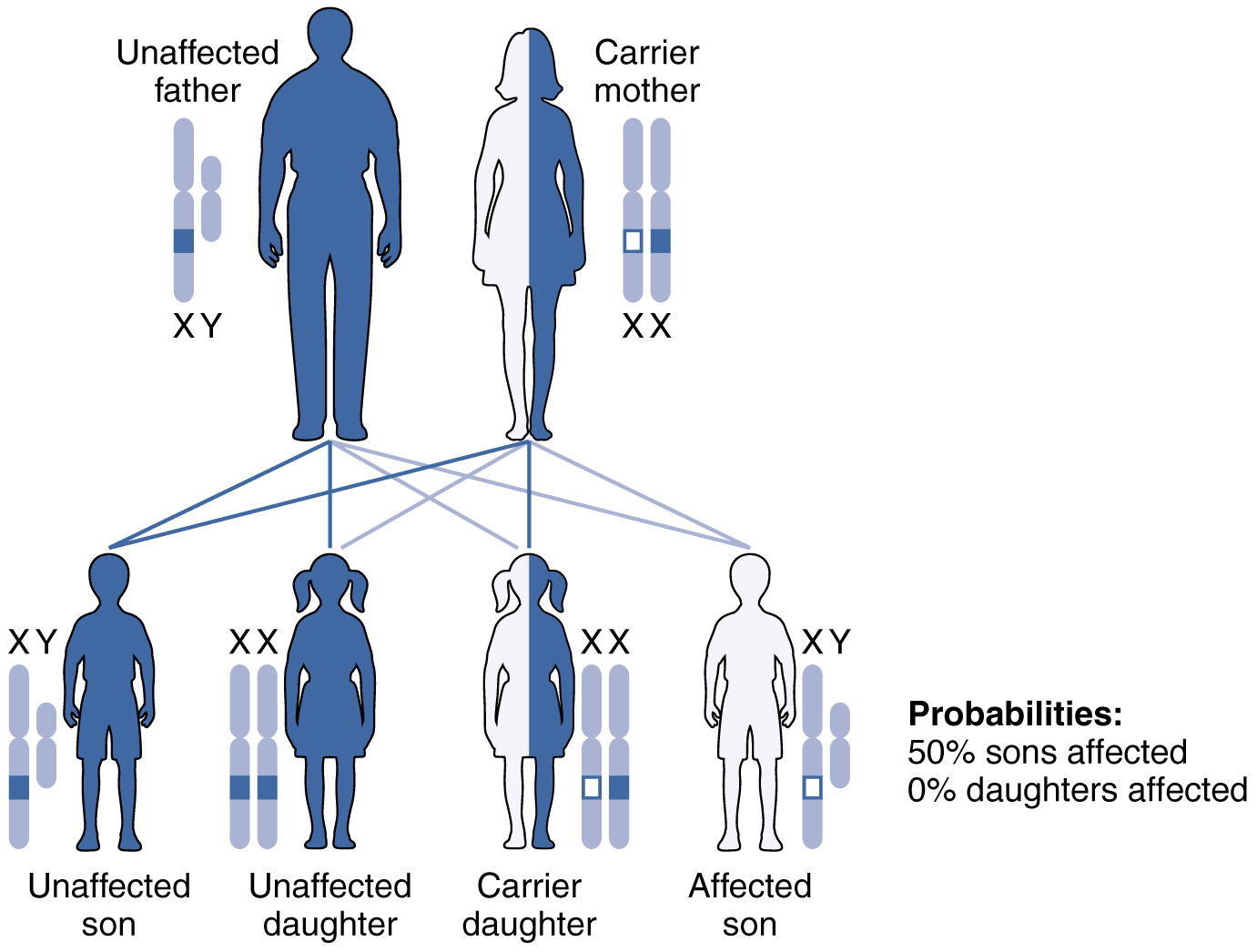
- Most cases of X-linked intellectual disability are inherited in a recessive fashion.
- Specialty: Medical genetics
- Usual onset: At conception
- Duration: Lifelong
- Causes: Genetic inheritance, de novo mutations
- Risk factors: Male sex
- Diagnostic method: Genetic testing
- Frequency: 16% of intellectual disability cases in males

X-linked intellectual disability refers to medical disorders associated with X-linked recessive inheritance that result in intellectual disability.

As with most X-linked disorders, males are more heavily affected than females. Females with one affected X chromosome and one normal X chromosome tend to have milder symptoms.

Unlike many other types of intellectual disability, the genetics of these conditions are relatively well understood. It has been estimated there are ~200 genes involved in this syndrome; of these ~100 have been identified. Many of these genes are found on the short 'p' arm of the chromosome, and duplications at Xp11.2 are associated with the syndromic form of the condition.

X-linked intellectual disability accounts for ~16% of all cases of intellectual disability in males.

== Syndromes ==
Several X-linked syndromes include intellectual disability as part of the presentation. These include:

- Coffin–Lowry syndrome
- DDX3X syndrome
- IQSEC2-related disorder
- MASA syndrome
- MECP2 duplication syndrome
- Mental retardation and microcephaly with pontine and cerebellar hypoplasia
- X-linked alpha thalassemia mental retardation syndrome

== List of genes ==
Following is a list of genes located on the X chromosome and linked to intellectual disability. There are also several loci that have not been associated with a specific gene.

- IQSEC2: encodes an exchange factor for the Arf family of small GTP binding proteins, involved in the formation of secretory vesicles.
- TM4SF2: is a member of the 4 transmembrane domains family of proteins (tetraspanins, see TSPAN7). This gene is also associated with neuropsychiatric diseases such as Huntington's chorea.
- AP1S2: AP-1 complex subunit sigma-2. Adaptor protein complex 1 is found on the cytoplasmic face of vesicles located at the Golgi complex, where it mediates both the recruitment of clathrin to the membrane and the recognition of sorting signals within the cytosolic tails of transmembrane receptors.
- ACSL4: Long-chain-fatty-acid—CoA ligase 4 is an enzyme of the long-chain fatty-acid-coenzyme A ligase family. It converts free long-chain fatty acids into fatty acyl-CoA esters, and thereby play a key role in lipid biosynthesis and fatty acid degradation. This isozyme preferentially utilizes arachidonate as substrate.
- ZNF41: Zinc finger protein 41 is a likely zinc finger family transcription factor.
- DLG3: Disks large homolog 3, also named neuroendocrine-DLG or synapse-associated protein 102 (SAP-102). DLG3 is a member of the membrane-associated guanylate kinase (MAGUK) superfamily.
- FTSJ1: Transfert RNA methyltransferase 1 is a member of the S-adenosylmethionine-binding protein family. This nucleolar protein is involved in the processing and modification of tRNA.
- GDI1: RabGDI alpha makes a complex with geranylgeranylated small GTP-binding proteins of the Rab family and keeps them in the cytosol.
- MECP2: methyl CpG binding protein 2 is a transcription regulator, which represses transcription from methylated gene promoters. It appears to be essential for the normal function of nerve cells. In contrast to other MBD family members, MECP2 is X-linked and subject to X inactivation. MECP2 gene mutations are the cause of most cases of Rett syndrome, a progressive neurologic developmental disorder and one of the most common causes of intellectual disability in women.
- ARX: Aristaless related homeobox, is a protein associated with intellectual disability and lissencephaly. This gene is a homeobox-containing gene expressed during development. The expressed protein contains two conserved domains, a C-peptide (or aristaless domain) and the prd-like class homeobox domain. It is a member of the group-II aristaless-related protein family whose members are expressed primarily in the central and/or peripheral nervous system. This gene is involved in CNS and pancreas development. Mutations in this gene cause X-linked intellectual disability and epilepsy.
- KDM5C: Lysine-specific demethylase 5C is an enzyme that in humans is encoded by the KDM5C gene a member of the SMCY homolog family and encodes a protein with one ARID domain, one JmjC domain, one JmjN domain and two PHD-type zinc fingers. The DNA-binding motifs suggest this protein is involved in the regulation of transcription and chromatin remodeling.
- PHF8: PHD finger protein 8 belongs to the family of ferrous iron and 2-oxoglutarate dependent oxygenases, and is a histone lysine demethylase with selectivity for the di-and monomethyl states.
- FMR2: Fragile mental retardation 2 (FMR2: synonym AFF2), the protein belongs to the AFF family which currently has four members: AFF1/AF4, AFF2/FMR2, AFF3/LAF4 and AFF4/AF5q31. All AFF proteins are localized in the nucleus and have a role as transcriptional activators with a positive action on RNA elongation. AFF2/FMR2, AFF3/LAF4 and AFF4/AF5q31 localize in nuclear speckles (subnuclear structures considered to be storage/modification sites of pre-mRNA splicing factors) and are able to bind RNA with a high apparent affinity for the G-quadruplex structure. They appear to modulate alternative splicing via the interaction with the G-quadruplex RNA-forming structure.
- Slc6a8: Creatine transporter is a protein that is required for creatine to enter the cell. Creatine is essential for maintaining ATP levels in cells with a high energy demand.
- GSPT2
- MAGED1
- UBE2A
- OGT

== See also ==
- Xp11.2 Duplication
