= Xp11.2 duplication =

Genetic disorder

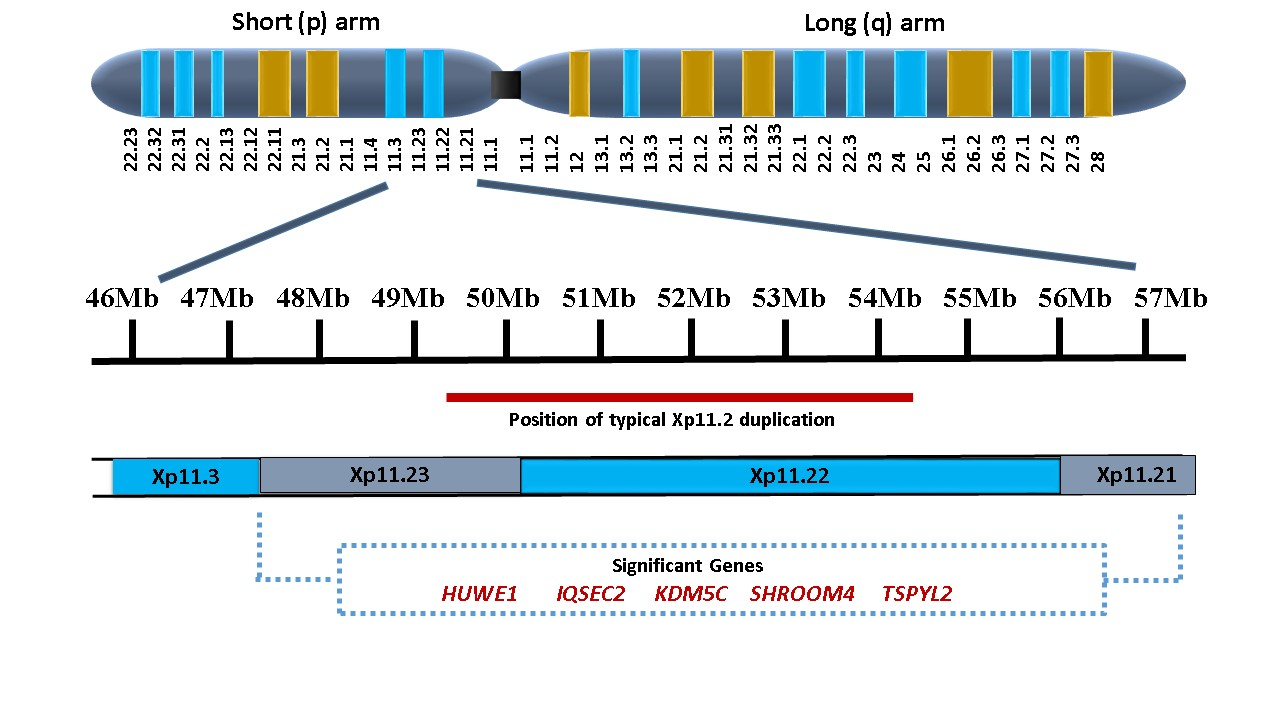
Region of Xp11.2 duplications.

Xp11.2 duplication is a genomic variation marked by the duplication of an X chromosome region on the short arm p at position 11.2, defined by standard karyotyping (G-banding). This gene-rich, rearrangement prone region can be further divided into three loci - Xp11.21, Xp11.22 and Xp11.23. The duplication could involve any combination of these three loci. While the length of the duplication can vary from 0.5Mb to 55 Mb, most duplications measure about 4.5Mb and typically occur in the region of 11.22-11.23. Most affected females show preferential activation of the duplicated X chromosome. Features of affected individuals vary significantly, even among members of the same family. The Xp11.2 duplication can be 'silent' - presenting no obvious symptoms in carriers - which is known from the asymptomatic parents of affected children carrying the duplication. The common symptoms include intellectual disabilities, speech delay and learning difficulties, while in rare cases, children have seizures and a recognizable brain wave pattern when assessed by EEG (electroencephalography).

== Symptoms and signs ==
Information on the clinical symptoms and features is taken from the Human Phenotype Ontology database and the Unique database. All affected individuals needn't show all the symptoms. Some of the most noted features are:

- Intellectual and Learning Disabilities
- Speech delay
- Early puberty
- Significant weight and height problems
- Lower-extremity anomalies (anomalies of the legs and/ or feet)
- Epileptic Seizures
- Unusual pattern of EEG with centro-temporal focal spike waves in children
- Minor facial features

=== Intellectual and Learning Disabilities ===
Among people who need support with their learning, at least 3% are believed to carry the duplication. It is noted that affected members of the same family with the same Xp11.2 microduplication generally have similar learning profiles. Children with small duplications of 0.5-1.3 Mb seem to have a mild learning difficulty, while others with the typical duplication of around 4.5 Mb generally have a borderline, mild or moderate learning disability. An extreme case with a very large duplication of 55 Mb has shown to have a severe intellectual disability.

=== Speech Delay ===
Speech is very commonly affected and usually the first sign. Both speech and comprehension seem to be affected, to various degrees of extent. Low facial muscle tone underlies difficulty in making certain sounds of speech. Nasal or hoarse voice are also observed. Babies are known to be unable to suck from breast in their infancy due to weak facial muscles.

=== Early Puberty ===
Early puberty occurs in 80% of the affected children or adults, with girls starting their menstrual cycles as early as age 9 and boys showing signs of puberty at age 8.5. One boy from Unique had completed puberty by age 13.

=== Weight problems ===
Affected children show tendency to be overweight. This might indicate metabolism issues.

=== Lower-extremity Anomalies ===
Anomalies of lower limbs or feet are common in people with an Xp11.2 duplication, affecting about 71% cases. Features include flat feet, arched feet (pes cavus), clubfoot (talipes), narrow feet, webbed or joined toes/fingers (syndactyly), 5th finger clinodactyly, 5th toe hypoplasia, and tapering fingers.

=== Unusual EEG Pattern ===
A typical pattern of electrical activity in the brain of affected children, described as 'subclinical seizures' has been noted. A peculiar electroencephalographic pattern characterized by rolandic-like spikes and/or continuous spike wave during slow sleep (CSWS), also called centro-temporal focal spike, exists in childhood.

=== Minor Facial Features ===
The common unusual features include a short or flat groove between the nose and upper lip (philtrum), a large, high or deep nasal bridge, bushy eyebrows and/or uni-brow (synophrys), and thin lips.

== Cause ==
Using array-based Comparative Genomic Hybridization (aCGH) to screen 2,400 individuals with isolated or syndromic intellectual disability for copy number variation, Giorda et al. (2009) identified 8 (0.33%) unrelated individuals, 2 males and 6 females, with a microduplication at chromosome Xp11.23-p11.22. The rearrangement was familial in 3 patients. A female patient shared a 4.5-Mb duplication with her affected mother and sister, and an unrelated male patient shared a 4.5-Mb duplication with his affected mother and sister. A third unrelated male inherited a smaller 0.8-Mb duplication from his unaffected mother. Three additional individuals had de novo 4.5-Mb duplications, and 2 more had partially overlapping de novo 6.0- and 9.2-Mb duplications. Paternal origin of the duplication was demonstrated in all de novo female cases. Six affected females had selective inactivation of the normal X chromosome, whereas 3 had random X inactivation. Breakpoints could be identified in 8 individuals. The recurrent duplication was flanked distally by a segmental duplication (D-REP at 47.8-48.2 Mb) containing a cluster of genes and pseudogenes of the synovial sarcoma X breakpoint (SSX) and proximally by a complex repeat (P-REP at 52.1-53.1 Mb) rich in SSX, melanoma antigen and X antigen (XAGE) genes. Sequence analysis of the junctions demonstrated that the recurrent 4.5-Mb duplications were mediated by non-allelic homologous recombination (NAHR) or Alu-mediated recombination. The majority of these recombinations occurred between flanking complex segmental duplications. Region of duplication and copy number variation can be further confirmed by Fluorescence In-Situ Hybridization (FISH) and PCR.

== Genetics ==
The duplication at Xp11.2, especially the Xp11.22-11.23 region is syndromic and is implicated in X-linked mental retardation. The chromosomal duplication can be de novo or familial. Familial carriers of small duplication (<1 Mb) show X-linked recessive inheritance. All other affected individuals with larger duplication present dominant expression and comparable clinical phenotypes irrespective of sex, duplication size, and X-inactivation pattern.

Xp11.22 comprises approximately 5 Mb of DNA (chrX:49,800,001–54,800,000, hg19). A number of pathogenic deletions and duplications involving Xp11.22 have been described in individuals with developmental delay, intellectual disability and/or autism. These phenotypes have been attributed to changes in the copy number of several genes including HUWE1, KDM5C, IQSEC2, TSPYL2, SHROOM4, PHF8 and FAM120C.

=== HUWE1 ===
The HECT, UBA and WWE domain-containing protein 1 (HUWE1) is a HECT family ubiquitin ligase located on the X chromosome at Xp11.22 with growing genetic links to cancer and intellectual disability. Expression of the HUWE1 gene is found in several mouse tissues including cortex, hippocampus, tongue, eye, kidney, liver, adrenal gland, and fibroblasts. Increased copies of HUWE1 are associated with non-syndromic intellectual disability. Missense mutations in HUWE1 occur in multiple families with intellectual disability, including families with Juberg-Marsidi-Brooks syndrome. Patients with missense mutations in HUWE1 share clinical features with patients with a duplication of HUWE1. This suggests both increased and decreased HUWE1 function could be associated with intellectual disability, but evidence from an in vivo model system supporting or refuting this possibility remains absent.

=== KDM5C ===
KDM5C (Lysine-Specific Demethylase 5C) also known as jumonji, A/T-rich interactive domain 1C (JARID1C) is located on the X chromosome at Xp11.22-p11.21. The gene encodes a 1560 amino-acid protein that belongs to the JARID1 subfamily of Arid DNA-binding proteins. The protein possesses H3K4me3-specific demethylase activity and is shown to function as a transcriptional repressor through the RE-1-silencing transcription factor (REST) complex.

The mutations in KDM5C cause Claes-Jensen type syndromic X-linked Intellectual Disability characterized by moderate-to-severe ID, speech abnormalities and other clinical findings such as seizures and aggressive behavior in some individuals. There is also a report of a mutation in a patient with autism spectrum disorder. A study showed that Kdm5c-knockout mice exhibit adaptive and cognitive abnormalities similar to those in human X-linked intellectual disability and concluded that histone methylation dynamics sculpt the neuronal network.

=== IQSEC2 ===
IQ motif and Sec7 domain 2 (IQSEC2), also known as BRAG1 or IQ-ARFGEF, is located on the X chromosome at Xp11.22 and encodes guanine nucleotide exchange factor for the ARF family of GTP-binding proteins (ARFGEF). It is expressed in the neurons and is involved in cytoskeletal organization, dendritic spine morphology, and excitatory synaptic organization.

Mutations in IQSEC2 are widely associated in cases of X-linked non-syndromic intellectual disability, with some carrier females reported with learning disabilities. This gene is known to play a significant role in the maintenance of homeostasis within the neural environment of the human brain. A change of guanine nucleotide exchange factor activity may influence the regulation of actin cytoskeleton organization and neuronal development in the brain by reduced activation of the ARF6 substrate or a defect in the GTP-binding activity.

Two intragenic duplications predicted to cause termination mutations on the X-chromosome involving IQSEC2 were identified in two de novo cases, and one nonsense mutation was described in three additional male patients presenting severe intellectual disability and additional clinical features including neonatal hypotonia, delayed motor skills, seizures, strabismus, autistic-like behavior, stereotypic midline hand movements, microcephaly, little-to-no walking, little-to-no language skills, significant behavioral issues, and mildly abnormal facial features. A novel de novo mutation in the IQSEC2 gene identified through diagnostic exome sequencing showed significant developmental delay, seizures, hypotonia, vision impairments, plagiocephaly, autistic-like features, absent language skills, and abnormal MRI findings. IQSEC2 gene plays a larger role in the cause of X-linked cognitive impairment than previously thought. Additional consideration is warranted with regards to the syndromic nature of its phenotypic association.

=== TSPYL2 ===
Testis-Specific Protein Y-encoded (TSPY) Like 2 (TSPYL2) codes for a member of the TSPY-like/SET/nucleosome assembly protein-1 superfamily and is located on the X chromosome at Xp11.22. The encoded protein is localized to the nucleolus where it functions in chromatin remodeling and as an inhibitor of cell-cycle progression. Consistent with a possible role for Tspyl2 pathways in neurodevelopment, Xp11.2 microduplication incorporating the TSPYL2 locus has been reported in male patients with Attention Deficit Hyperactivity Disorder.

=== SHROOM4 ===
Shroom Family Member 4 (SHROOM4), also known as KIAA1202, encodes a member of the APX/Shroom family, which contains an N-terminal PDZ domain and a C-terminal ASD2 motif. It is located on the X chromosome at Xp11.22 and is mainly associated with the Stocco dos Santos X-linked intellectual disability syndrome characterized by cognitive disabilities. The encoded protein may play a role in cytoskeletal architecture. Symptoms of SHROOM4 gene mutations in the original family described by Stocco dos Santos include severe intellectual disability, bilateral congenital hip luxation and short stature. The SHROOM4 gene was also found to be disrupted in two unrelated females with mild to moderate intellectual disabilities. Other features included delayed or no speech, seizures, kyphosis and hyperactivity. Carrier females displayed seizures and depression. No mutations in SHROOM4 were identified in more than 1000 control X chromosomes.

== See also ==
X-linked Intellectual Disability
