= Katsuhiko Shirahige =

Japanese molecular biologist (born 1965)

- Born: 1965 (age 60–61); Okayama Prefecture, Japan
- Citizenship: Japanese
- Education: The University of Tokyo; Osaka University
- Known for: Genome-wide analysis of chromosome dynamics; cohesin biology
- Awards: JSPS Prize (FY2008); Commendation for Science and Technology by MEXT (2010)
- Scientific career
- Fields: Molecular biology
- Workplaces: Nara Institute of Science and Technology; RIKEN; Tokyo Institute of Technology; The University of Tokyo; Karolinska Institutet

Katsuhiko Shirahige (Japanese name order: Shirahige Katsuhiko; born 1965) is a Japanese molecular biologist whose work centers on how chromosomes are organized, copied and regulated. He is a professor at, and director of, the Institute for Quantitative Biosciences (IQB) at the University of Tokyo, where much of his research concerns cohesin, a protein complex involved in both chromosome segregation and gene regulation. He was the 22nd president of the Molecular Biology Society of Japan (MBSJ) in 2021–2022, and received the Japan Society for the Promotion of Science (JSPS) Prize for the 2008 fiscal year.

== Early life and education ==
Shirahige was born in 1965 in Okayama Prefecture. He studied at the University of Tokyo, graduating from its Department of Basic Science in 1988, and then moved to Osaka University for graduate work, completing a doctorate in medical science in 1994.

== Academic career ==
Shirahige began his research career on a JSPS postdoctoral fellowship in 1994, and the following year took up an assistant professorship at the Nara Institute of Science and Technology. In 2001 he joined the Genomic Sciences Center of RIKEN, and in 2004 he moved to the Tokyo Institute of Technology, where he was promoted to professor in 2007. He has held a professorship at the University of Tokyo since 2010, and there went on to become director of the IQB. Since 1 March 2024, he has also served as a visiting professor in the Department of Cell and Molecular Biology at Karolinska Institutet in Sweden.

== Research ==
Much of Shirahige's research has been focused on chromosome replication and cohesin, with cohesin related research among the more cited of his works. As of July 2026 his h-index has been assessed as 91.

=== Genome-wide analysis of chromosome dynamics ===
Shirahige's early work used the budding yeast Saccharomyces cerevisiae to examine where and how chromosomes begin to replicate, and how checkpoint mechanisms keep that process in order; a 1998 paper in Nature, for instance, addressed the regulation of DNA-replication origins as cells move through the cell cycle. In 2003 his group reported that the checkpoint proteins Tof1 and Mrc1 form a stable complex at paused DNA-replication forks; John Diffley discussed the significance of the work in a commentary in Nature Structural & Molecular Biology. From there his group turned to the whole genome, developing and refining genome-scale applications of chromatin immunoprecipitation coupled with DNA microarrays (ChIP-chip) to chart protein–DNA interactions across entire chromosomes. It was this body of work that the citation for his 2008 JSPS Prize recognized, crediting him with bringing together antibody-based protein detection, DNA-chip methods and informatics to make chromosome structure and dynamics systematically observable.

=== Cohesin and gene regulation ===
Cohesin, a protein complex best known for holding sister chromatids together, became a central theme of his later research as it became clear that the complex also shapes gene regulation. Working with international collaborators, he helped show in a 2004 Nature paper that cohesin does not simply remain where it is loaded onto DNA but relocates to regions where transcription converges. A 2007 study in Science, on which he was a collaborator, found that a single DNA double-strand break is enough to trigger cohesion across the genome — a result that Nature Reviews Genetics singled out, together with a parallel study from another group, in a research highlight. The following year, Shirahige and Jan-Michael Peters, as shared corresponding authors, reported in Nature that cohesin helps insulate genes from one another through the CCCTC-binding factor (CTCF); Nature Reviews Molecular Cell Biology featured that paper in a research highlight on the less familiar roles of cohesin.

=== Cohesin-related developmental disorders ===
This interest in cohesin also drew Shirahige into the study of human developmental disorders that arise when the complex malfunctions. He was the shared corresponding authors of a 2012 Nature paper tracing a form of Cornelia de Lange syndrome to mutations in HDAC8 and showing how they disturb the cohesin acetylation cycle. Three years later he was a shared corresponding author on a Nature Genetics study that identified gain-of-function mutations in AFF4 as the cause of CHOPS syndrome, linking the super elongation complex with cohesin; the U.S. National Library of Medicine's MedlinePlus now names AFF4 mutations as the cause of the syndrome, citing that paper.In 2025 his group reported evidence for a molecular mechanism shared by Cornelia de Lange and CHOPS syndromes. Frank Uhlmann discussed the study and its implications for enhancer disruption in cohesinopathies in a Current Biology Dispatch.

== Academic service ==
From 2021 to 2022 Shirahige served as the 22nd president of the Molecular Biology Society of Japan. The society is a large one: writing in 2023, the European Molecular Biology Organization (EMBO) put its membership at 12,000 and noted its collaborations with EMBO itself and with the American Society for Cell Biology.

== Awards and honours ==
In 2003 Shirahige received the inaugural Mitsubishi Chemical Award of the Molecular Biology Society of Japan, for his analysis of the control of replication initiation in eukaryotic chromosomes. (Note: The society records the prize as its 1st Mitsubishi Chemical Award (三菱化学奨励賞); the subject's ORCID record renders it in English as the "Molecular Biology Society of Japan Young Scientist Award.") He received the 5th JSPS Prize, for the 2008 fiscal year, under the citation "Establishment and Applications of Chromosome Analysis Technology Based on Genomic Information"; the prize is given each year to no more than 25 researchers drawn from across the humanities, social sciences and natural sciences. In 2010 he received the Commendation for Science and Technology by the Minister of Education, Culture, Sports, Science and Technology, in the research category, for work on the molecular coordination of chromosome functions.
