= AF4/FMR2 family =

Family of nuclear transcriptional activators

Transcriptional factor AF4/FMR2

Identifiers
- Symbol: AF-4
- Pfam: PF05110
- InterPro: IPR007797
- CATH: 2lm0
Available protein structures:
- PDB: IPR007797 PF05110 (ECOD; PDBsum)
- AlphaFold: IPR007797; PF05110

AF4/FMR2 (AFF) is a family of nuclear transcriptional activators that encourage RNA elongation. There are four genes in this family, all of which reside in the nucleus of the cells. The gene family includes AFF1/AF4, AFF2/FMR2, AFF3/LAF4 and AFF4/AF5q31. Within the family, the AFF2/FMR2 is silenced in FRAXE intellectual disability; while the other three gene families will form fusion genes as a consequence of chromosome translocations with the myeloid/lymphoid or mixed lineage leukemia gene in acute lymphoblastic leukemias. While different members of the AF4/FMR2 family are known for playing various roles in cells, they all commonly participate in the regulation of splicing and transcription.

== AF4/FMR2 in Drosophila ==
After research and examination, a Drosophila orthologue has been identified. Cells homozygous for a defective mutant of the gene are abnormally small, so the researchers named the gene Lilliputian (Lilli; Q9VQI9). It contains an AT-hook domain. It represents a novel pair-rule gene that acts in cytoskeleton regulation, segmentation and morphogenesis in Drosophila. Like Lilli, human AFF1 and AFF4 participate in the super elongation complex. The AFF1 and AFF4 proteins form this complex by linking positive elongation factor b (P-TEFb) and ELL1/2, which are two transcriptional elongation factors. These genes use chromatin remodeling and elongation to regulate transcription. The Lilli gene identifies the FMR2 functions that are possible, but not specific, in humans and mice.

== AF4/FMR2 in humans ==
Human genes include AFF1, AFF2, AFF3, and AFF4. Fusion genes involving AFF1 can produce a rogue activator leading to leukemia. Mutations in AFF2 are implicated in breast cancer. AFF2/FMR2 are found within the placenta and brains on the X chromosome. A trinucleotide repeat disorder involving AFF2 causes X-linked intellectual disability. This is due to the repetition of over 200 genes in the 5’ region of the untranslated helix. With overextension and methylation on this replicated gene (FRM1) is what leads to FRAXE ID – a rare human disease. This condition is known as FRAXE ID where the hippocampal region of the brain is affected in long-term potentiation and it causes intellectual disability. The FMR2 gene has been identified as a part of several pathways within the body (the transforming growth factor-β pathway, the Raf/MEK/MAP kinase pathway, and the P13K/PKB pathway). Studies have been performed on knockout mice to prove the detrimental effect it has on the body such as infliction on organ growth, cell growth, and cytoskeletal structure.
