= AFF2 =

Protein-coding gene in humans

Identifiers
- Aliases: AFF2, FMR2, FMR2P, FRAXE, MRX2, OX19, AF4/FMR2 family member 2, XLID109
- External IDs: OMIM: 300806; MGI: 1202294; GeneCards: AFF2

Gene location (Human)
Chr.	X chromosome (human)
Band	Xq28	Start	148,500,617 bp
Band	Xq28	End	149,000,663 bp

Gene location (Mouse)
Chr.	X chromosome (mouse)
Band	X|X A7.1- A7.2	Start	68,403,900 bp
Band	X|X A7.1- A7.2	End	68,911,643 bp
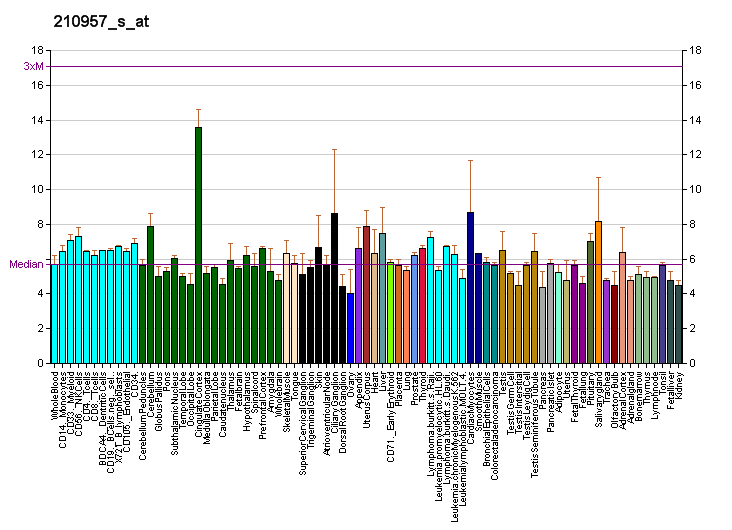

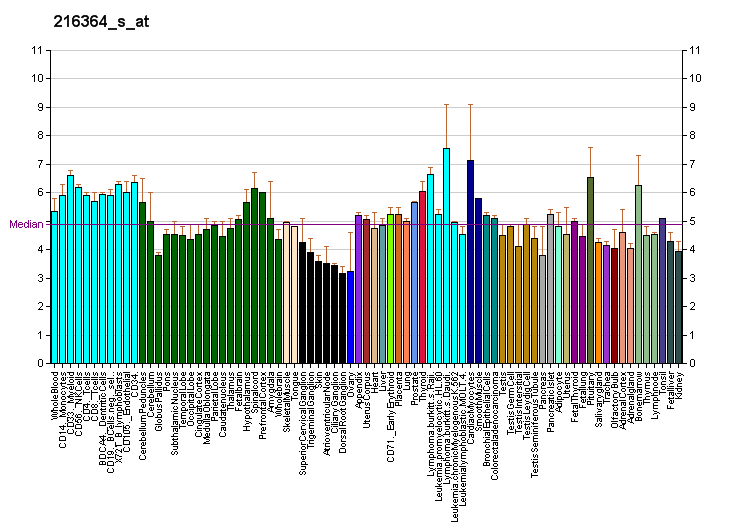

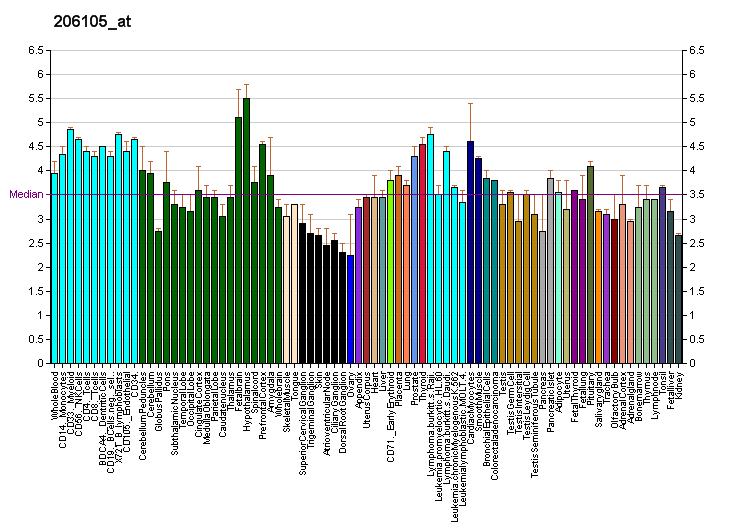
RNA expression pattern
Bgee	Human / Mouse (ortholog); Top expressed in: ganglionic eminence; Achilles tendon; ventricular zone; bone marrow cell; Brodmann area 23; periodontal fiber; cerebellar cortex; cerebellar hemisphere; right lung; middle temporal gyrus / Top expressed in: genital tubercle; granulocyte; lumbar subsegment of spinal cord; tail of embryo; dentate gyrus of hippocampal formation granule cell; ganglionic eminence; superior frontal gyrus; embryo; ventricular zone; primary visual cortex; More reference expression data
BioGPS	More reference expression data
Gene ontology
Molecular function	G-quadruplex RNA binding; RNA binding; double-stranded DNA binding; DNA-binding transcription factor activity
Cellular component	nuclear speck; nucleus; transcription elongation factor complex; super elongation complex
Biological process	mRNA processing; regulation of RNA splicing; brain development; RNA splicing; learning or memory; regulation of gene expression; negative regulation of gene expression; nuclear speck organization; regulation of transcription, DNA-templated
Sources:Amigo / QuickGO
Orthologs
Databases	NCBI: entry; OMA: entry
Species	Human	Mouse
Entrez	2334	14266
Ensembl	ENSG00000155966	ENSMUSG00000031189
UniProt	P51816	O55112
RefSeq (mRNA)	NM_002025; NM_001169122; NM_001169123; NM_001169124; NM_001169125 NM_001170628	NM_008032
RefSeq (protein)	NP_001162593; NP_001162594; NP_001162595; NP_001162596; NP_001164099 NP_002016	NP_032058
Location (UCSC)	Chr X: 148.5 – 149 Mb	Chr X: 68.4 – 68.91 Mb
PubMed search
- Wikidata
View/Edit Human	View/Edit Mouse

AF4/FMR2 family member 2 is a protein that in humans is encoded by the AFF2 gene. Mutations in AFF2 are implicated in cases of breast cancer.

CCG repeat expansions in this gene are associated with X-linked intellectual disability and specifically a syndrome known as Fragile XE mental retardation (FRAXE). FRAXE is one of the most common forms of non-syndromic X-linked intellectual disability. The gene is also known as FMR2 (Fragile Mental Retardation 2) after this condition.

== Genomics ==
This gene is located on the long arm of chromosome X (Xq27.3-Xq28) It has 22 exons spanning at least 500 kb. Alternative splicing may occur and involve exons 2, 3, 5, 7 and 21. The normal encoded protein is 1311 codons in length. It is expressed as an 8.7 kilobase transcript in the placenta and adult brain.

The normal 5' untranslated region has 10-35 CCG repeats and more frequently 15–20. Pathogenic expansions have typically over 200 repeats and are methylated.

This gene belongs to the AFF family of genes which currently has four members: AFF1/AF4, AFF2/FMR2, AFF3/LAF4 and AFF4/AF5q31. All AFF proteins are localized in the nucleus and have a role as transcriptional activators with a positive action on RNA elongation. AFF2/FMR2, AFF3/LAF4 and AFF4/AF5q31 localize in nuclear speckles (subnuclear structures considered to be storage/modification sites of pre-mRNA splicing factors) and are able to bind RNA with a high apparent affinity for the G-quadruplex structure. They appear to modulate alternative splicing via the interaction with the G-quadruplex RNA-forming structure.

The other members of this family have been reported to form fusion genes as a consequence of chromosome translocations and are involved in the pathogenesis of myeloid/lymphoid or mixed lineage leukemia.
