= KDM5C =

Protein-coding gene in the species Homo sapiens

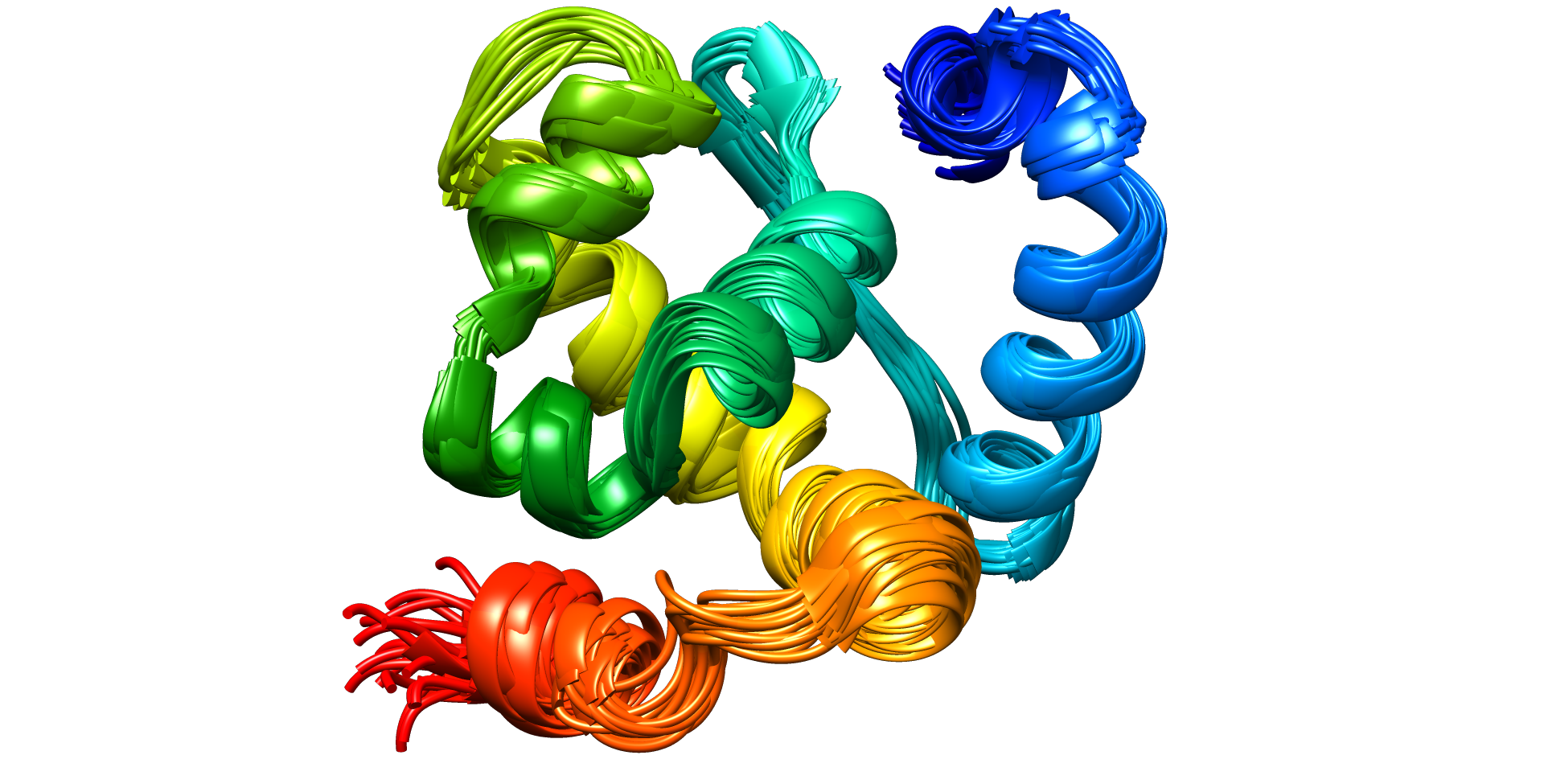

Identifiers
- Aliases: KDM5C, DXS1272E, JARID1C, MRX13, MRXJ, MRXSCJ, MRXSJ, SMCX, XE169, lysine demethylase 5C
- External IDs: OMIM: 314690; MGI: 99781; GeneCards: KDM5C
Available structures
PDB	Ortholog search: PDBe RCSB
PDB	List of PDB id codes 2JRZ, 5FWJ
Enzyme activity
EC #	BRENDA	ExPASy	KEGG	MetaCyc
1.14.11.67	↗	↗	↗	↗

Gene location (Human)
Chr.	X chromosome (human)
Band	Xp11.22	Start	53,176,283 bp
Band	Xp11.22	End	53,225,422 bp

Gene location (Mouse)
Chr.	X chromosome (mouse)
Band	X F3|X 68.46 cM	Start	151,016,016 bp
Band	X F3|X 68.46 cM	End	151,057,531 bp
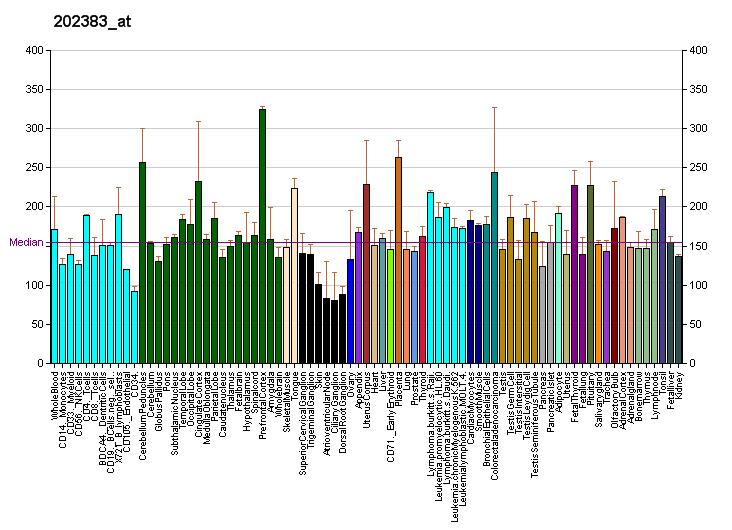
RNA expression pattern
Bgee	Human / Mouse (ortholog); Top expressed in: sural nerve; stromal cell of endometrium; right uterine tube; body of uterus; left ovary; granulocyte; right ovary; ectocervix; skin of leg; skin of abdomen / Top expressed in: epithelium of lens; yolk sac; pineal gland; neural layer of retina; fossa; condyle; substantia nigra; trigeminal ganglion; retinal pigment epithelium; ventricular zone; More reference expression data
BioGPS	More reference expression data
Gene ontology
Molecular function	DNA binding; oxidoreductase activity; dioxygenase activity; metal ion binding; histone demethylase activity; zinc ion binding; histone H3-methyl-lysine-4 demethylase activity; protein binding; DNA-binding transcription factor activity, RNA polymerase II-specific; DNA-binding transcription repressor activity, RNA polymerase II-specific; chromatin binding; histone H3-tri/di/monomethyl-lysine-4 demethylase activity; methylated histone binding
Cellular component	nucleus; nucleoplasm; cytosol; histone methyltransferase complex
Biological process	negative regulation of transcription, DNA-templated; regulation of transcription, DNA-templated; transcription, DNA-templated; rhythmic process; response to toxic substance; histone H3-K4 demethylation; chromatin organization; regulation of transcription by RNA polymerase II; negative regulation of transcription by RNA polymerase II; histone H3-K4 demethylation, trimethyl-H3-K4-specific; chromatin remodeling
Sources:Amigo / QuickGO
Orthologs
Databases	NCBI: entry; OMA: entry
Species	Human	Mouse
Entrez	8242	20591
Ensembl	ENSG00000126012	ENSMUSG00000025332
UniProt	P41229	P41230
RefSeq (mRNA)	NM_001146702; NM_001282622; NM_004187; NM_001353978; NM_001353979 NM_001353981; NM_001353982; NM_001353984	NM_013668
RefSeq (protein)	NP_001140174; NP_001269551; NP_004178; NP_001340907; NP_001340908 NP_001340910; NP_001340911; NP_001340913	NP_038696; NP_001390000; NP_001390001; NP_001390002; NP_001390003 NP_001390004; NP_001390005
Location (UCSC)	Chr X: 53.18 – 53.23 Mb	Chr X: 151.02 – 151.06 Mb
PubMed search
- Wikidata
View/Edit Human	View/Edit Mouse

Lysine-specific demethylase 5C is an enzyme that in humans is encoded by the KDM5C gene. KDM5C belongs to the alpha-ketoglutarate-dependent hydroxylase superfamily.

== Structure ==
This gene is a member of the SMCY homolog family and encodes a protein with one ARID domain, one JmjC domain, one JmjN domain and two PHD-type zinc fingers.

== Function ==
The DNA-binding motif suggest this protein is involved in the regulation of transcription and chromatin remodeling. Research has shown that KDM5C functions as a demethylase to remove di- and tri-methylation marks from lysine 4 of histone H3 (H3K4), resulting in the transcriptional repression of certain genes.

== Clinical significance ==
=== Developmental disorders ===
Mutations in this gene have been associated with X-linked intellectual disability. Loss of function of KDM5C has been shown to alter gene expression, which can lead to dysregulation of genes involved in neurodevelopment. Alternatively spliced variants that encode different protein isoforms have been described but the full-length nature of only one has been determined.

=== Cancer ===
KDM5C has also been implicated in certain cancers, though this role can vary across different cancer types.

== See also ==
- Xp11.2 duplication, section KDM5C
- KDM5C-related neurodevelopmental disorder
