= ARID3B =

Protein-coding gene in the species Homo sapiens

Identifiers
- Aliases: ARID3B, BDP, DRIL2, AT-rich interaction domain 3B
- External IDs: OMIM: 612457; MGI: 1930768; GeneCards: ARID3B

Gene location (Human)
Chr.	Chromosome 15 (human)
Band	15q24.1	Start	74,541,206 bp
Band	15q24.1	End	74,598,131 bp

Gene location (Mouse)
Chr.	Chromosome 9 (mouse)
Band	9|9 B	Start	57,697,636 bp
Band	9|9 B	End	57,744,076 bp
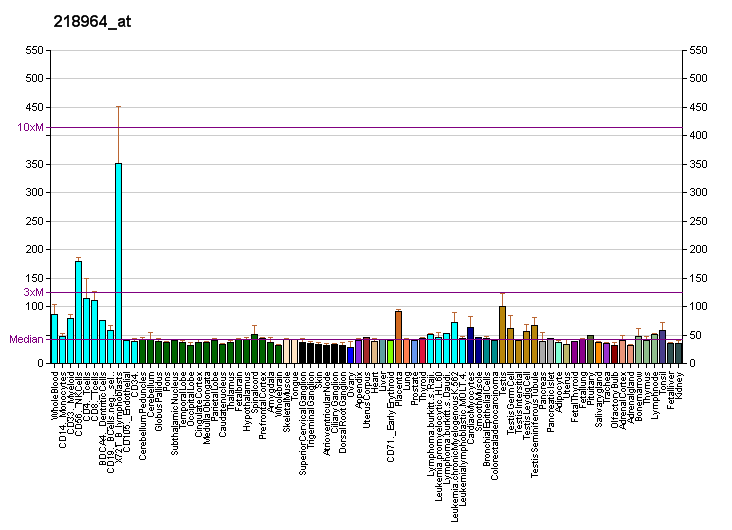
RNA expression pattern
Bgee	Human / Mouse (ortholog); Top expressed in: oocyte; gonad; blood; left testis; granulocyte; right testis; secondary oocyte; testicle; bone marrow cell; placenta / Top expressed in: tail of embryo; epiblast; granulocyte; genital tubercle; Rostral migratory stream; yolk sac; zygote; neural layer of retina; embryo; lens; More reference expression data
BioGPS	More reference expression data
Gene ontology
Molecular function	RNA polymerase II cis-regulatory region sequence-specific DNA binding; DNA binding; DNA-binding transcription activator activity, RNA polymerase II-specific; protein binding; RNA polymerase II transcription regulatory region sequence-specific DNA binding; DNA-binding transcription factor activity, RNA polymerase II-specific
Cellular component	nucleoplasm; nucleus
Biological process	regulation of transcription, DNA-templated; transcription by RNA polymerase II; transcription, DNA-templated; positive regulation of transcription by RNA polymerase II; biological process
Sources:Amigo / QuickGO
Orthologs
Databases	NCBI: entry; OMA: entry
Species	Human	Mouse
Entrez	10620	56380
Ensembl	ENSG00000179361	ENSMUSG00000004661
UniProt	Q8IVW6	Q9Z1N7
RefSeq (mRNA)	NM_001307939; NM_006465	NM_019689; NM_001379353
RefSeq (protein)	NP_001294868; NP_006456	NP_062663; NP_001366282
Location (UCSC)	Chr 15: 74.54 – 74.6 Mb	Chr 9: 57.7 – 57.74 Mb
PubMed search
- Wikidata
View/Edit Human	View/Edit Mouse

AT-rich interactive domain-containing protein 3B is a protein that in humans is encoded by the ARID3B gene.

== Function ==
This gene encodes a member of the ARID (AT-rich interaction domain) family of DNA-binding proteins. The encoded protein is homologous with two proteins that bind to the retinoblastoma gene product, and also with the mouse Bright and Drosophila dead ringer proteins. A pseudogene on chromosome 1p31 exists for this gene. Members of the ARID family have roles in embryonic patterning, cell lineage gene regulation, cell cycle control, transcriptional regulation and possibly in chromatin structure modification.
