= KDM5C-related neurodevelopmental disorder =

Rare genetic disorder

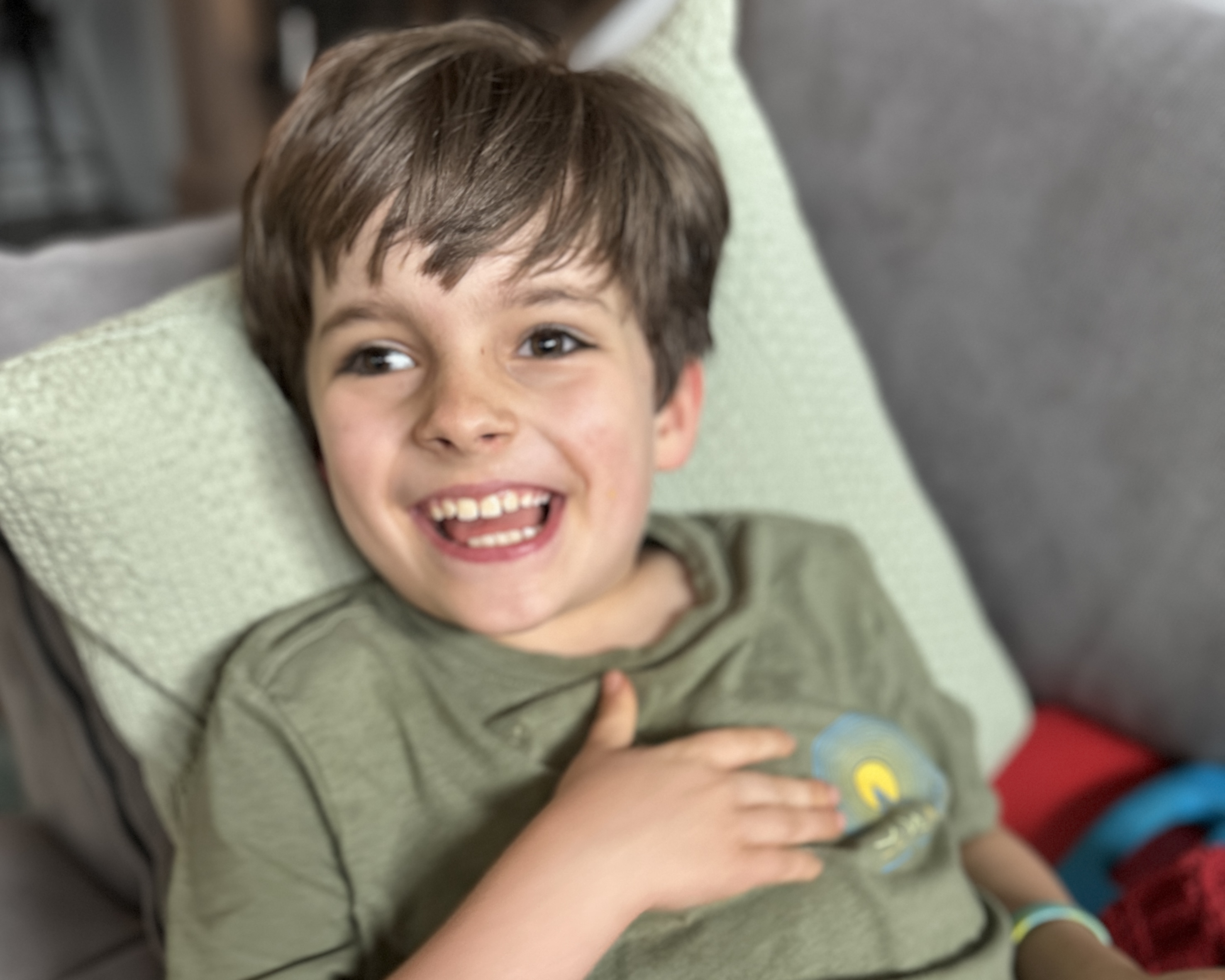
- A boy pictured smiling with unique facial features including deep-set eyes and strabismus, characteristics of KDM5C-related neurodevelopmental disorder
- Specialty: Neurology, medical genetics, gastroenterology, ophthalmology
- Symptoms: Intellectual disability, language delay, hypotonia, hypertonia, autism, ADHD, seizures, short stature, strabismus, farsightedness, gastrointestinal issues, sleep disturbances, craniofacial differences
- Usual onset: At conception
- Duration: Lifelong
- Causes: X-linked genetic mutation
- Diagnostic method: Genetic testing

KDM5C-related neurodevelopmental disorder (also known as Claes-Jensen syndrome) is a rare genetic condition caused by variants in the KDM5C gene, located on the X chromosome. The disorder primarily affects neurodevelopment and cognition, leading to a spectrum of intellectual, behavioral, and physical features that vary widely among affected individuals.

== Presentation ==
The features of KDM5C-related neurodevelopmental disorder vary considerably, even among individuals with the same variant. Commonly reported findings include:

- Global developmental delay and intellectual disability
- Speech and language delay
- Hypotonia/hypertonia
- Behavioral differences(autism spectrum ADHD)
- Seizures
- Short stature
- Ocular findings(strabismus or farsightedness)
- Gastrointestinal issues
- Sleep disturbances
- Distinctive craniofacial features

KDM5C is an X-linked gene, meaning that males—who have one X chromosome—are typically more severely affected than females, who have two copies. Males with pathogenic variants generally exhibit moderate to severe intellectual disability and multiple associated features. Females may present with milder symptoms, ranging from subtle cognitive differences to moderate developmental delay, or they may be asymptomatic carriers.

== Cause ==
KDM5C-related neurodevelopmental disorder follows an X-linked inheritance pattern. Males with a pathogenic KDM5C variant will pass the variant to all of their daughters and none of their sons. Females with one variant have a 50% chance of transmitting it to each child, regardless of sex. Some cases arise de novo, meaning the variant occurs spontaneously and is not inherited from either parent. Rarely, germline mosaicism may explain recurrence in unaffected parents.

== Molecular mechanism ==
KDM5C encodes a lysine-specific histone demethylase that regulates transcription by modifying histone H3 at lysine 4 (H3K4), a process critical for gene expression and chromatin organization. The protein plays an important role in neurons, where it contributes to synaptic development, dendritic spine morphology, and neural network formation.

Pathogenic variants in KDM5C can disrupt this regulation, resulting in widespread changes in gene expression that affect neuronal differentiation, metabolism, and plasticity.

== Diagnosis ==
Diagnosis requires genetic testing, typically through targeted gene panels, whole exome sequencing, or whole genome sequencing.

== Management ==
There is no cure for KDM5C-related neurodevelopmental disorder. Treatment focuses on managing individual symptoms through a multidisciplinary approach that may include:

- Neurology (seizures or tone abnormalities)
- Speech, occupational, and physical therapy
- Behavioral and psychological interventions
- Gastroenterology (feeding or digestive issues)
- Ophthalmology and sleep medicine

== Society and culture ==
Families and researchers affected by KDM5C-related conditions are supported by the KARES Foundation, a nonprofit organization that promotes awareness, supports research, and connects families worldwide. KARES also coordinates annual conferences and data-sharing initiatives with platforms such as RARE-X to accelerate understanding and therapeutic development.

== History ==
The condition was first described in the early 2000s by Dr. Stephan Claes and Dr. Lars Jensen, based on studies of males with X-linked intellectual disability and shared clinical characteristics. It was initially termed Claes-Jensen syndrome, but as more individuals with KDM5C variants have been identified—particularly females and those with milder phenotypes—the broader and more inclusive term KDM5C-related neurodevelopmental disorder has become preferred.

The KDM5C gene has also been referred to in earlier literature as JARID1C or SMCX.

== Research ==
Ongoing studies are exploring how KDM5C regulates gene expression in neurons and how its dysfunction leads to disease. Recent publications have highlighted its roles in WNT signaling, ribosomal gene regulation, and mitochondrial metabolism, all of which influence cognitive development. Research is also examining potential therapeutic strategies targeting chromatin modifiers and histone demethylases.
