= AFF1 =

Protein-coding gene in the species Homo sapiens

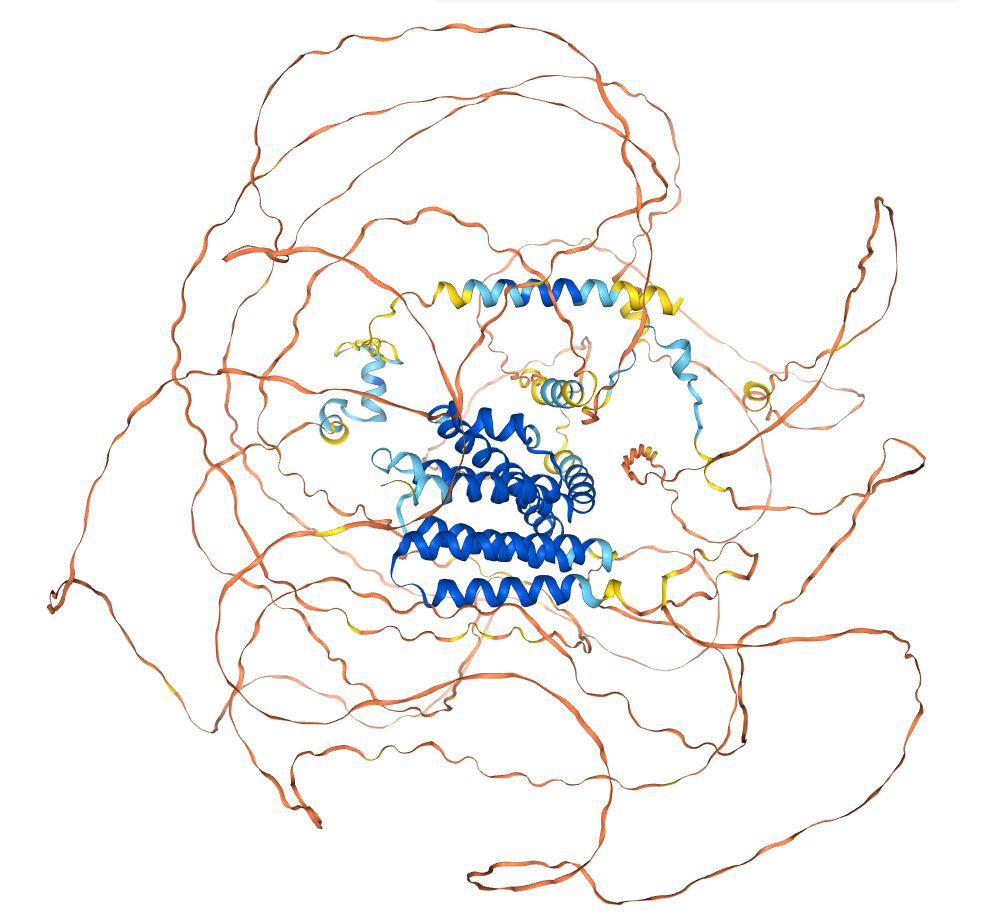

Identifiers
- Aliases: AFF1, AF4, MLLT2, PBM1, AF4/FMR2 family member 1
- External IDs: OMIM: 159557; MGI: 1100819; GeneCards: AFF1
Available structures
| PDB | Ortholog search: PDBe RCSB |
| PDB | List of PDB id codes 2LM0 |

Gene location (Human)
| Chr. | Chromosome 4 (human) |
| Band | 4q21.3-q22.1 | Start | 86,935,002 bp |
| Band | 4q21.3-q22.1 | End | 87,141,039 bp |

Gene location (Mouse)
| Chr. | Chromosome 5 (mouse) |
| Band | 5 E5|5 50.45 cM | Start | 103,840,240 bp |
| Band | 5 E5|5 50.45 cM | End | 104,003,188 bp |
RNA expression pattern
| Bgee | Human / Mouse (ortholog); Top expressed in: Epithelium of choroid plexus; renal medulla; skin of hip; retinal pigment epithelium; tail of epididymis; trabecular bone; Skeletal muscle tissue of biceps brachii; seminal vesicula; caput epididymis; glutes / Top expressed in: lacrimal gland; ciliary body; cumulus cell; retinal pigment epithelium; gastrula; vestibular membrane of cochlear duct; iris; Paneth cell; lobe of prostate; decidua; More reference expression data |
| BioGPS | n/a |
Gene ontology
| Molecular function | DNA-binding transcription factor activity; protein binding; double-stranded DNA binding |
| Cellular component | nucleus; transcription elongation factor complex; super elongation complex |
| Biological process | regulation of transcription, DNA-templated |
Sources:Amigo / QuickGO
Orthologs
| Databases | NCBI: entry; OMA: entry |
| Species | Human | Mouse |
| Entrez | 4299 | 17355 |
| Ensembl | ENSG00000172493 | ENSMUSG00000029313 |
| UniProt | P51825 | O88573 |
| RefSeq (mRNA) | NM_001313959; NM_001313960; NM_001166693; NM_005935 | NM_001080798; NM_133919 |
| RefSeq (protein) | NP_001160165; NP_001300888; NP_001300889; NP_005926 | n/a |
| Location (UCSC) | Chr 4: 86.94 – 87.14 Mb | Chr 5: 103.84 – 104 Mb |
| PubMed search |
- Wikidata
| View/Edit Human | View/Edit Mouse |

AF4/FMR2 family member 1 is a protein that in humans is encoded by the AFF1 gene. At its same location was a record for a separate PBM1 gene, which has since been withdrawn and considered an alias. It was previously known as AF4 (ALL1-fused gene from chromosome 4).

The gene is a member of the AF4/FMR2 (AFF) family, a group of nuclear transcriptional activators which encourage RNA elongation. It is a component of the super elongation complex. The AFF1 protein, and to the same extent AFF4, has multiple functions but is primarily used to assemble the components of the super elongation complex by creating binding surfaces. It is recognized as a proto-oncogene: chromosomal translocations associated with leukemia can fuse this gene with others like KMT2A, producing an uncontrolled activator protein. Translocation creates the fusion protein KMT2A-AFF1 which is the primary oncogenic fusion that sets up the pre-leukemic conditions responsible for driving acute lymphoblastic leukemia.

== Gene ==
The AFF1 gene has 23 exons and is located on the human chromosome 4 at q21 spanning approximately 206,028 base pairs long. 24 transcript variants have been identified. These variants arise through alternative splicing with each variant encoding distinct protein isoforms. These protein isoforms vary in shape and length with the most stable canonical structure being AFF1-201.

== Isoforms ==
Image of AFF1-201 that consists of 1210 amino acids

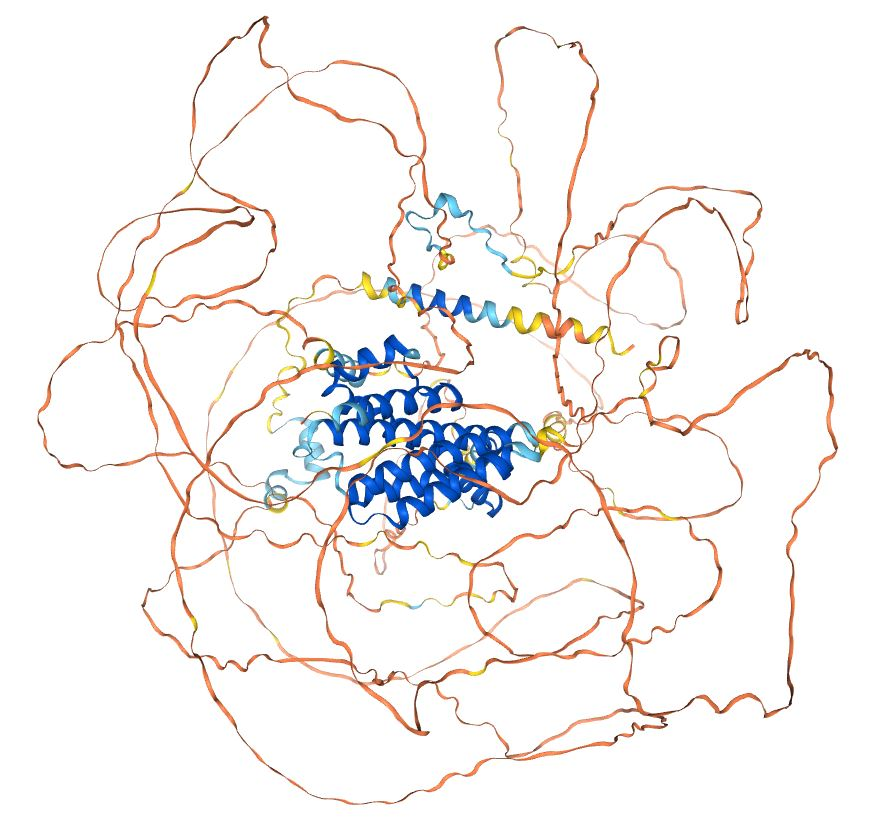
Image of AFF1-202 that consists of 1218 amino acids

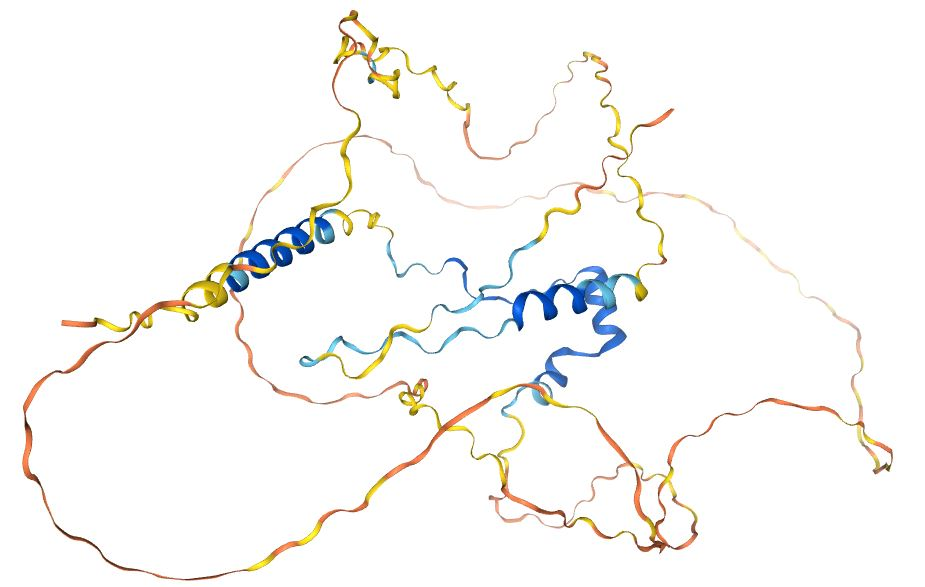
Image of AFF1-206 that consists of 406 amino acids

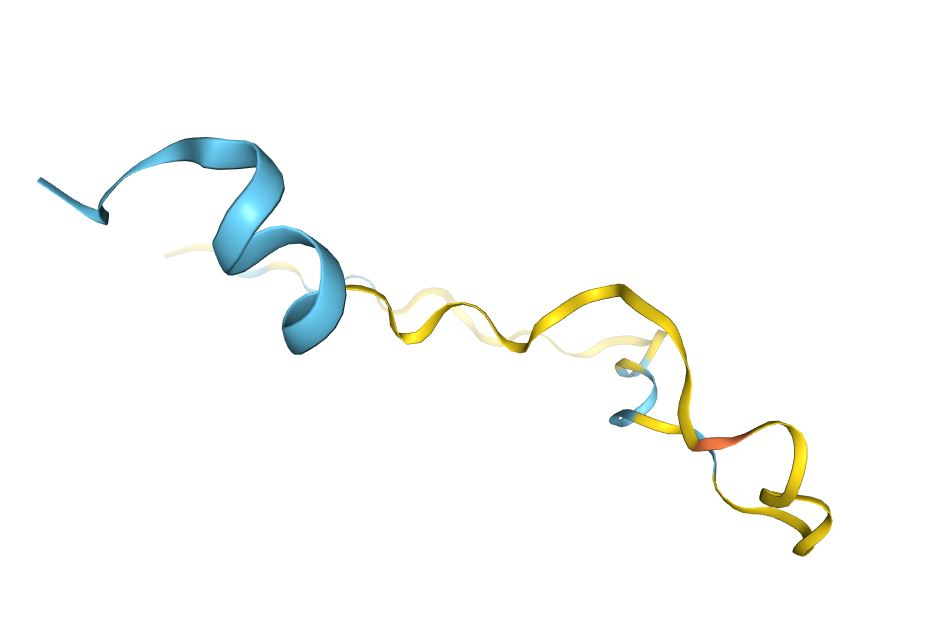
Image of AFF1-207 that consists of 52 amino acids

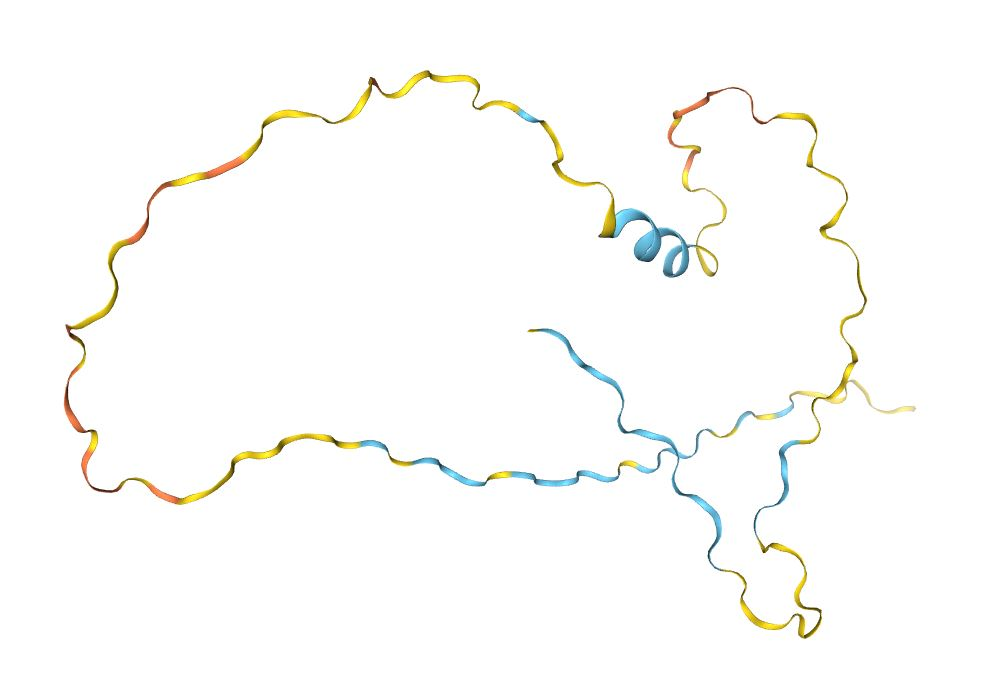
Image of AFF1-208 that consists of 137 amino acids

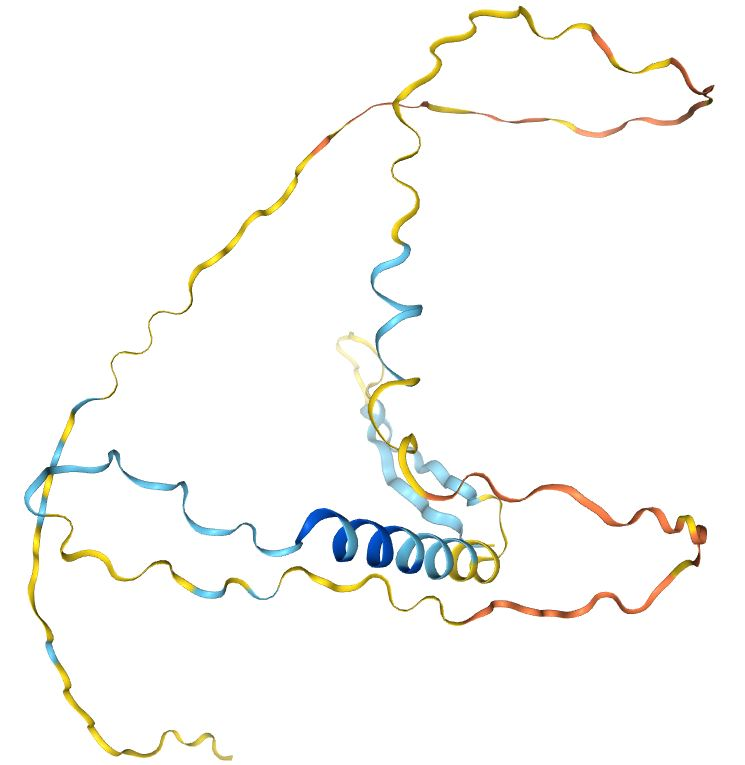
Image of AFF1-210 that consists of 194 amino acids

== Structure ==
The AFF1 protein consists of approximately 1210 amino acids and contains multiple regions for protein-protein interactions. Direct, one-on-one interactions have been shown experimentally with both MLLT3 and ARFRP1 proteins, while broader datasets suggest association with numerous additional factors similarly involved in transcriptional regulation.

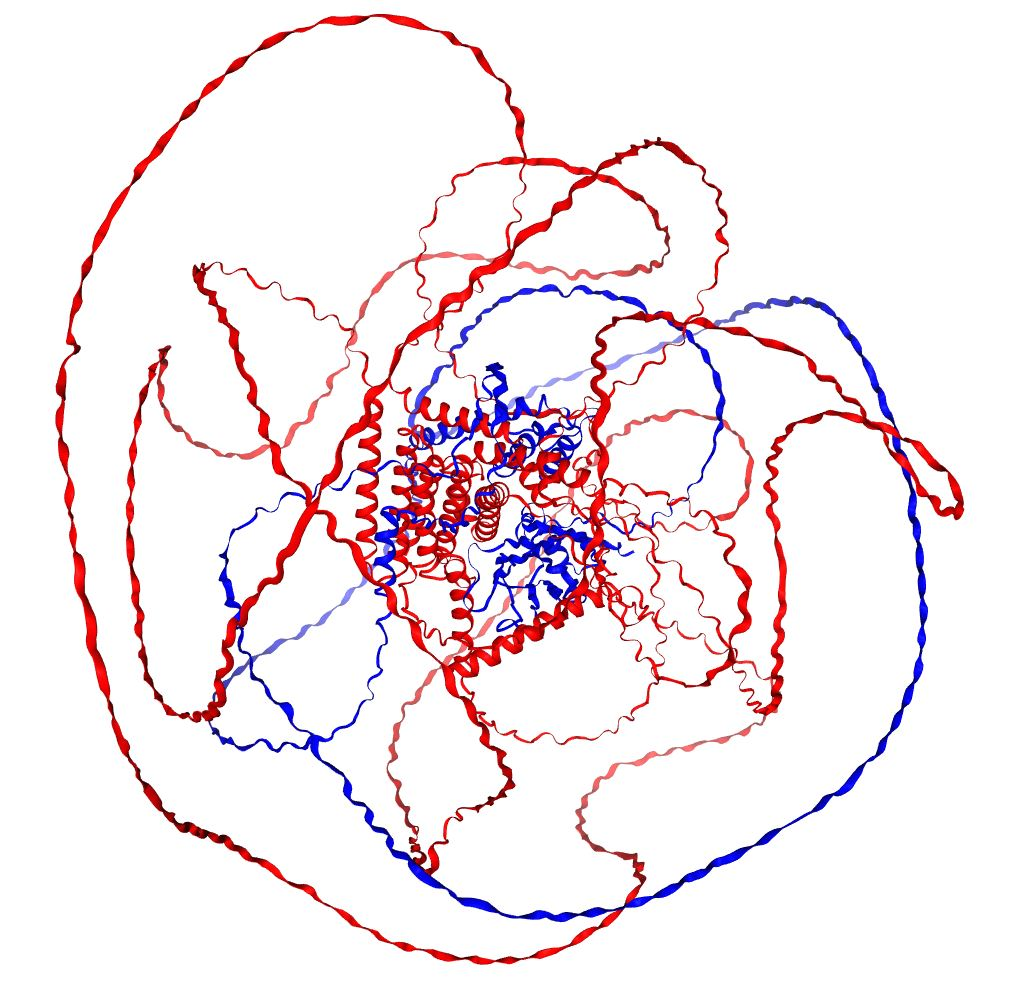
This is an image of the AFF1-MLLT3 interaction

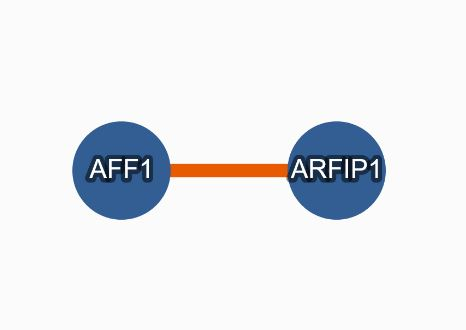
This is an illustration of the AFF1 and ARFIP1 protein–protein interaction, one of two binary interactions observed through experimentation.

== Function ==
AFF1 is a multi functional transcriptional regulator protein capable of promoting transcription elongation as well as assembling the super elongation complex. RNA Polymerase II synthesizes mRNA using the DNA template strand during the elongation step of transcription with the support of AFF1 and the super elongation complex. In this complex AFF1 brings with it the P-TEFb protein, which stimulates RNA Polymerase II into transitioning from promoter-proximal pausing to productive elongation. AFF1 also brings the ELL elongation factor enzyme which increases the catalytic rate of RNA Polymerase II transcription, helping produce rapid gene expression. In this way AFF1 acts as a scaffold protein by assembling and stabilizing the super elongation complex to promote efficient transcription elongation.

== Clinical signficance ==
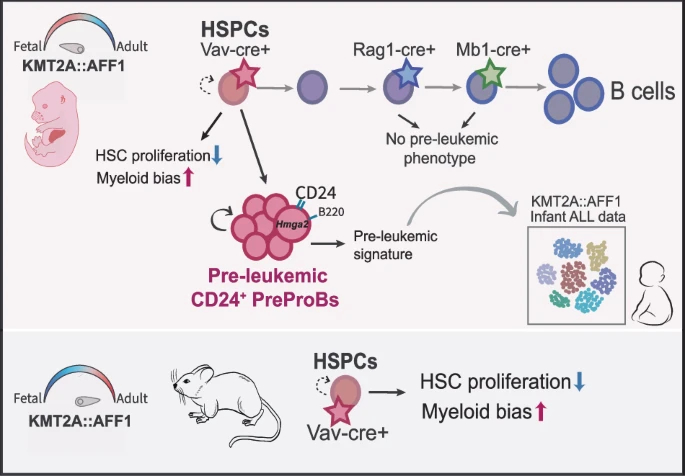
KMT2A-AFF1 fusion causing a pre-leukemic state in fetal/embryonic mice while having a reduced effect on adult mice.

AFF family proteins like AFF1 are critical for the stability and function of the super elongation complex. Chromosomal translocation with Histone-lysine N-methyltransferase 2A, also known as mixed-lineage leukemia 1 (MLL1), is associated with acute lymphoblastic leukemia. KMT2A–AFF1, or MLL-AFF1, is one of the fused proteins responsible for misregulation of transcription elongation. The most common translocations of these proteins are KMT2A-AFF1 and its reciprocal AFF1-KMT2A, however AFF1-KMT2A is not the main driver of acute lymphoblastic leukemia. Although AFF1-KMT2A is capable of setting up pre-leukemic conditions, this reciprocal protein fusion later becomes dispensable. The canonical oncogenic protein fusion is KMT2A-AFF1 which has been shown through gene-knockdown experimentation.

The dangerous pre-leukemic state caused by the KMT2A-AFF1 fusion is dependent on age because this fusion can lead to the misregulation of transcription elongation in fetal and embryonic hematopoietic stem cells. In contrast, the same fusion when induced in adult mice caused less hematopoietic stem cell proliferation.

AFF1 is also implicated in the transcriptional regulation of HIV and other viruses because its role in the super elongation complex is exploitable, enhancing viral gene expression through transcription elongation. In order to hijack the super elongation complex, HIV produces the Tat protein to recruit P-TEFb which ends up significantly boosting viral gene expression. Tat also has an affinity for super elongation complexes containing AFF1 and AFF4 proteins. AFF1 and AFF4 scaffolding proteins create more stable binding surface for both Tat and P-TEFb proteins, because AFF family proteins reshape the surface of P-TEFb when present in the super elongation complex.
