= ARID1A =

Protein-coding gene in humans

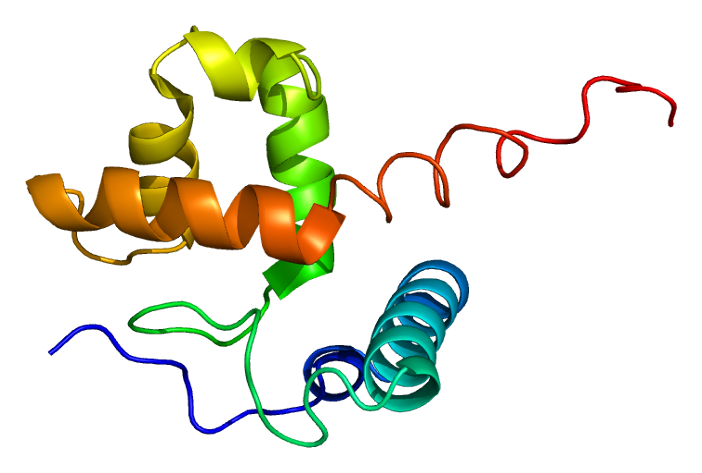

Identifiers
- Aliases: ARID1A, B120, BAF250, BAF250a, BM029, C1orf4, ELD, MRD14, OSA1, P270, SMARCF1, hELD, hOSA1, CSS2, AT-rich interaction domain 1A
- External IDs: OMIM: 603024; MGI: 1935147; GeneCards: ARID1A
Available structures
PDB	Ortholog search: PDBe RCSB
PDB	List of PDB id codes 1RYU

Gene location (Human)
Chr.	Chromosome 1 (human)
Band	1p36.11	Start	26,693,236 bp
Band	1p36.11	End	26,782,104 bp

Gene location (Mouse)
Chr.	Chromosome 4 (mouse)
Band	4|4 D2.3	Start	133,679,008 bp
Band	4|4 D2.3	End	133,756,769 bp
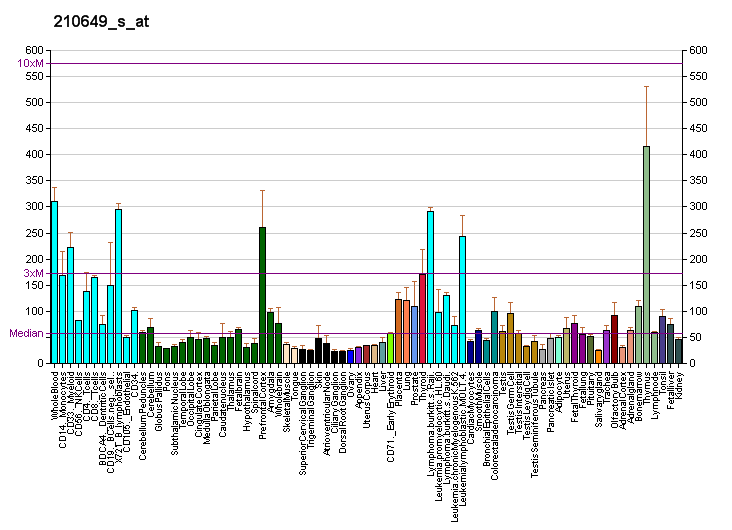

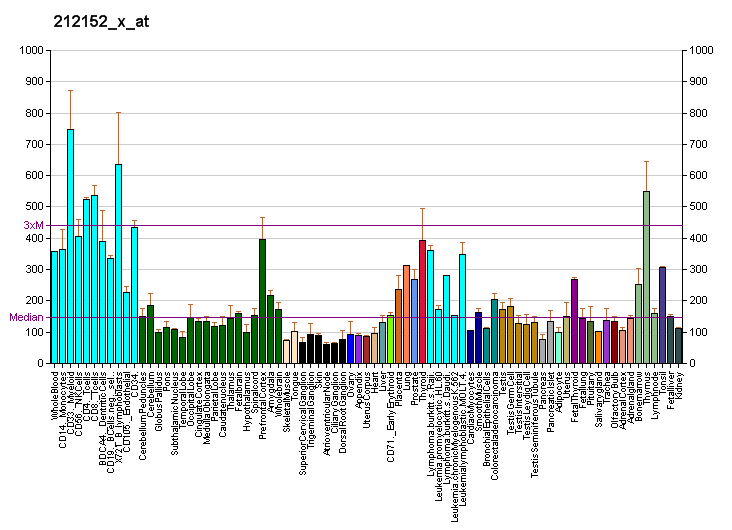

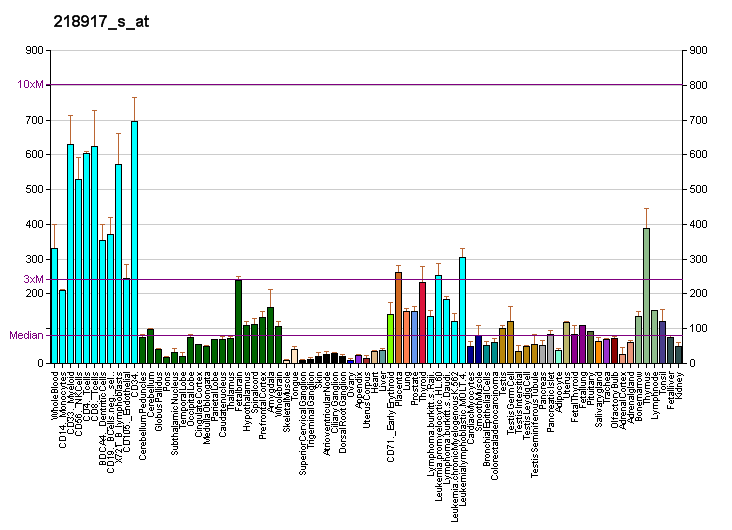
RNA expression pattern
Bgee	Human / Mouse (ortholog); Top expressed in: bone marrow cell; ventricular zone; embryo; epithelium of colon; mucosa of ileum; ganglionic eminence; caput epididymis; corpus epididymis; sural nerve; trabecular bone / Top expressed in: zygote; secondary oocyte; primitive streak; lymph node; tail of embryo; genital tubercle; molar; primary oocyte; human fetus; neural layer of retina; More reference expression data
BioGPS	More reference expression data
Gene ontology
Molecular function	DNA binding; transcription coactivator activity; protein binding; nuclear receptor binding; nucleosome binding; DNA-binding transcription factor activity, RNA polymerase II-specific
Cellular component	nBAF complex; SWI/SNF complex; nucleoplasm; npBAF complex; nucleus; SWI/SNF superfamily-type complex; brahma complex
Biological process	androgen receptor signaling pathway; chromatin remodeling; regulation of transcription, DNA-templated; regulation of transcription by RNA polymerase II; cardiac muscle cell differentiation; optic cup formation involved in camera-type eye development; placenta blood vessel development; negative regulation of transcription by RNA polymerase II; toxin transport; chromatin organization; transcription, DNA-templated; nervous system development; cardiac chamber development; positive regulation of transcription, DNA-templated; neural tube closure; nucleosome disassembly; forebrain development; intracellular estrogen receptor signaling pathway; glucocorticoid receptor signaling pathway; formation of primary germ layer; gastrulation; embryo implantation; stem cell population maintenance
Sources:Amigo / QuickGO
Orthologs
Databases	NCBI: entry; OMA: entry
Species	Human	Mouse
Entrez	8289	93760
Ensembl	ENSG00000117713	ENSMUSG00000007880
UniProt	O14497	A2BH40
RefSeq (mRNA)	NM_139135; NM_006015; NM_018450	NM_001080819; NM_001363070
RefSeq (protein)	NP_006006; NP_624361	NP_001074288; NP_001349999; NP_001388200; NP_001388202; NP_001388204 NP_001388205
Location (UCSC)	Chr 1: 26.69 – 26.78 Mb	Chr 4: 133.68 – 133.76 Mb
PubMed search
- Wikidata
View/Edit Human	View/Edit Mouse

AT-rich interactive domain-containing protein 1A is a protein that in humans is encoded by the ARID1A gene.

== Function ==
ARID1A is a member of the SWI/SNF family, whose members have helicase and ATPase activities and are thought to regulate transcription of certain genes by altering the chromatin structure around those genes. The encoded protein is part of the large ATP-dependent chromatin remodelling complex SWI/SNF, which is required for transcriptional activation of genes normally repressed by chromatin. The protein has two large intrinsically disordered regions (IDRs) that mediate the interaction with binding partners. It also possesses at least two conserved domains that are important for its function. First, it has an ARID domain, which is a DNA-binding domain that can specifically bind an AT-rich DNA sequence known to be recognized by a SWI/SNF complex at the beta-globin locus. Second, the C-terminus of the protein can stimulate glucocorticoid receptor-dependent transcriptional activation. The protein encoded by this gene confers specificity to the SWI/SNF complex and recruits the complex to its targets through either protein-DNA or protein-protein interactions. Two transcript variants encoding different isoforms have been found for this gene.

== Clinical significance ==
The gene encoding ARID1A is the most frequently mutated SWI/SNF subunit across cancers. This gene has been commonly found mutated in different cancers leading to loss of function, including gastric cancers, colon cancer, ovarian clear cell carcinoma, liver cancer, lymphoma and pancreatic cancer. In breast cancer distant metastases acquire inactivation mutations in ARID1A not seen in the primary tumor, and reduced ARID1A expression confers resistance to different drugs such as trastuzumab and mTOR inhibitors. These findings provide a rationale for why tumors accumulate ARID1A mutations.

== Research ==
Lack of this gene/protein seems to protect rats from some types of liver damage.

== Interactions ==
ARID1A interacts with SWI/SNF subunits SMARCB1 and SMARCA4. Intrinsically disordered regions of ARID1A enable the SWI/SNF complex to interact with multiple transcription factors through binding of the ARM domain of beta-catenin.
