= Ovarian clear-cell carcinoma =

One of the subtypes of ovarian carcinoma

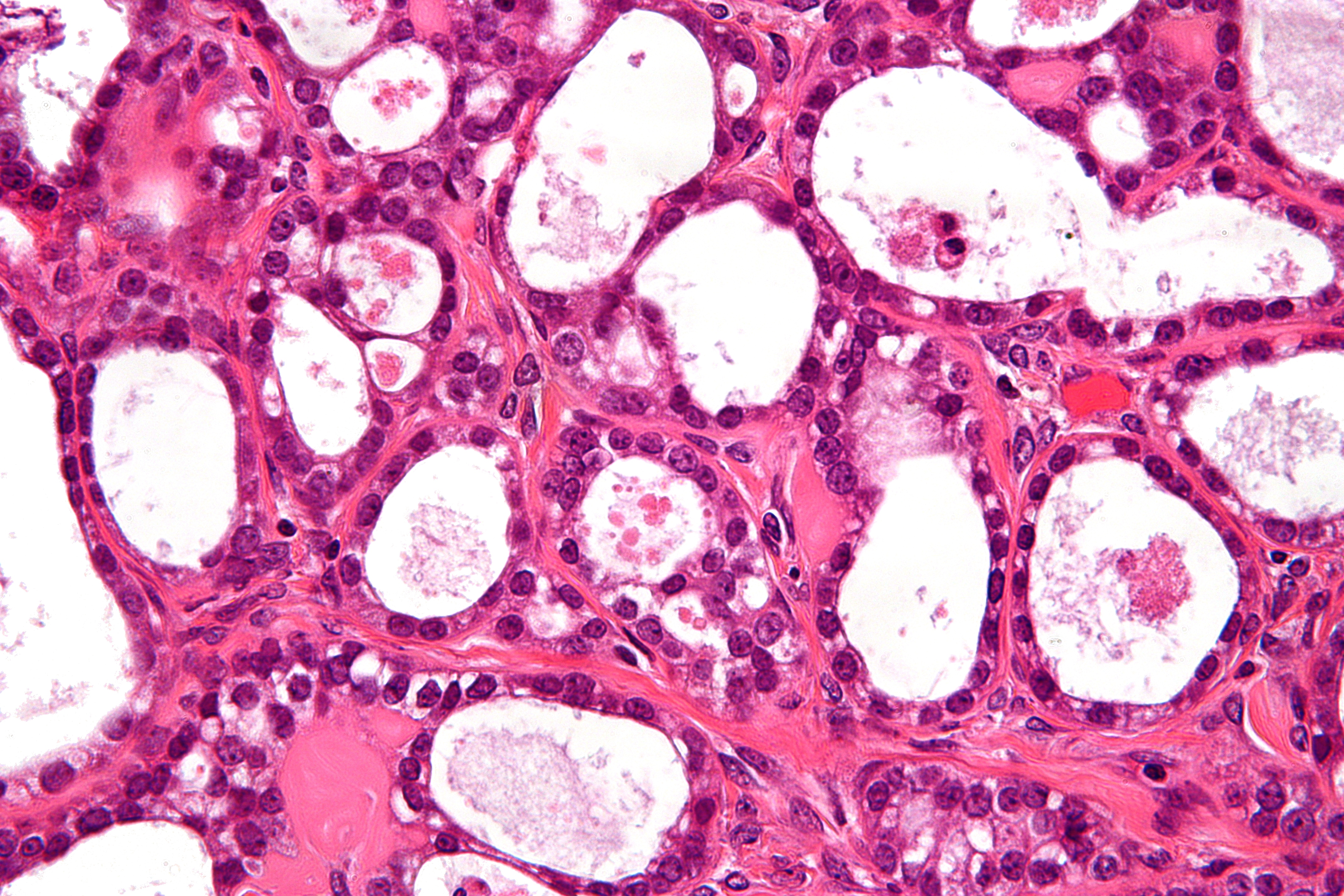
Micrograph of an ovarian clear-cell carcinoma. H&E stain

Ovarian clear-cell carcinoma, or clear-cell carcinoma of the ovary, also called ovarian clear-cell adenocarcinoma, is one of several subtypes of ovarian carcinoma – a subtype of epithelial ovarian cancer, in contrast to non-epithelial cancers. According to research, most ovarian cancers start at the epithelial layer which is the lining of the ovary. Within this epithelial group ovarian clear-cell carcinoma makes up 5–10%.

It was recognized as a separate category of ovarian cancer by the World Health Organization in 1973. Its incidence rate differs across various ethnic groups. Reports from the United States show that the highest rates are among Asian patients with 11.1% versus white patients with 4.8% and black patients at 3.1%. These numbers are consistent with the finding that although clear-cell carcinomas are rare in Western countries they are much more common in parts of Asia.

== Background ==
There are two subtypes of ovarian carcinoma – epithelial and nonepithelial; ovarian clear-cell carcinoma is an epithelial ovarian cancer. The other major subtypes within this group include high-grade serous, endometrioid, mucinous, and low-grade serous. The serous type is the most common form of epithelial ovarian tumors. Cord-stromal and germ cell belong to the nonepithelial category which are much less common.

== Structure and function ==
Ovarian clear-cell carcinoma often occurs as a pelvic mass that rarely appears bilaterally. The cells usually contain glycogen with large clear cytoplasm. It is also associated with endometriosis, a disorder of abnormal tissue growth outside of the uterus. The tumor cells emerge in a stepwise manner from adenofibromas which are benign endometriotic cysts. They also hold molecular genetic mutations in both ARID1A and PIK3CA, similar to other epithelial ovarian cancers. Mutations in ARID1A commonly contain phosphatase and tensin homolog (PTEN) that are hypothesized to contribute to clear-cell tumorigenesis. However, research also shows that inactivation of ARID1A alone does not lead to tumor initiation. However, clear-cell tumors rarely carry p53, BRCA1, or BRCA2 mutations. In addition, they also test negative for estrogen and progesterone receptors and Wilm tumor suppressor 1. Studies have also suggested that clear-cell carcinoma can occur with thromboembolic complications and hypercalcemia. Recurrence of tumor cells have been reported to involve lymph nodes and parenchymal organs.

Research continues to look for ways to understand clear-cell tumor progression. A suggested mechanism is the amplification and overexpression of CCNE1 which is thought to promote the tumor's aggressive behavior. In addition, they also test negative for estrogen and progesterone receptors and Wilm tumor suppressor 1. The CCNE1 gene encodes for the cyclin E1 protein which accumulates at the G1-S phase transition point of the cell cycle. Detecting the cancerous tumor progression can be difficult for pathologists. While some tumors will appear in the ovary, others spread over the outer lining of the ovary and to other organs such as the uterus, fallopian tube, and lymph glands.

== Clinical relevance ==
Clear-cell tumors are frequently found at an early stage and therefore can be cured with surgery. Through clinical examination or preoperative imaging techniques, tumors have been reported to range from 3-20 cm. Most ovarian tumors are benign and rarely spread past the ovary. Therefore, surgical removal of the ovary or partial removal of the ovary is sufficient for treatment for malignant tumors. When diagnosed beyond FIGO (International Federation of Gynecology and Obstetrics) stage 1 patients usually have a poor prognosis. If the malignant tumors metastasize and spread throughout the body then they could potentially be fatal. Clear-cell tumors have been found to be resistant to conventional chemotherapy using platinum and taxane. Although the cause of this chemoresistance is unknown, there is research that provides partial explanation of this occurrence. For example, studies show that clear-cell tumor cells proliferate at lower rates than serous adenocarcinomas which then could aid in a lower response from clear-cell tumors to chemotherapies.

Given that treatment options are limited for ovarian clear-cell cancer patients, researchers are studying biomarkers or specific pathways that could aid in developing future treatment. These patients are good candidates for targeted therapies since the standard does not adequately help their care. Some suggested therapeutic targets include the PI3K/AKT/mTOR, VEGF, Il-6/STAT3, MET, and HNF-1beta pathways. Better insight into genomic heterogeneity would also provide a personalized approach to identifying treatment targets for clear-cell tumor patients that share similar phenotypes. Developing stronger options is also beneficial because ovarian cancer is the fifth leading cause of cancer deaths for women and is one of the most lethal gynecological cancers.
