= TSPAN7 =

Protein-coding gene in humans

Identifiers
- Aliases: TSPAN7, A15, CCG-B7, CD231, DXS1692E, MRX58, MXS1, TALLA-1, TM4SF2, TM4SF2b, tetraspanin 7, XLID58
- External IDs: OMIM: 300096; MGI: 1298407; GeneCards: TSPAN7

Gene location (Human)
Chr.	X chromosome (human)
Band	Xp11.4	Start	38,561,542 bp
Band	Xp11.4	End	38,688,920 bp

Gene location (Mouse)
Chr.	X chromosome (mouse)
Band	X|X A1.1	Start	10,351,397 bp
Band	X|X A1.1	End	10,462,844 bp
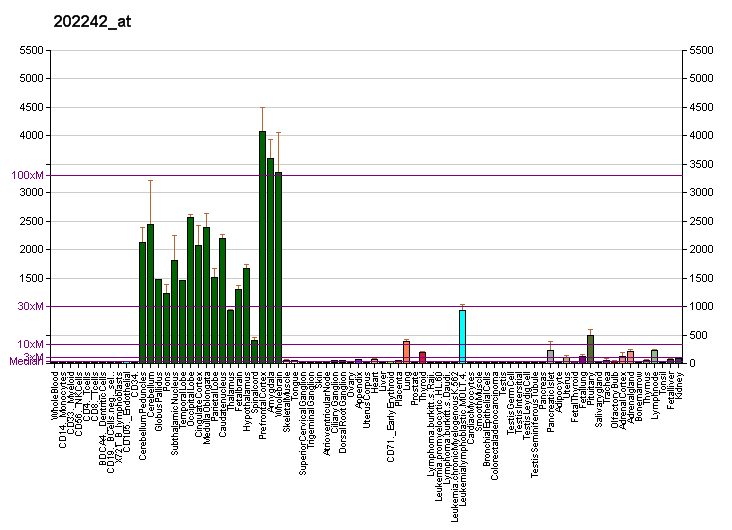
RNA expression pattern
Bgee	Human / Mouse (ortholog); Top expressed in: caudate nucleus; nucleus accumbens; dorsolateral prefrontal cortex; prefrontal cortex; putamen; right frontal lobe; Brodmann area 9; cerebellar cortex; frontal pole; cerebellar hemisphere / Top expressed in: dentate gyrus of hippocampal formation granule cell; perirhinal cortex; entorhinal cortex; CA3 field; superior frontal gyrus; primary visual cortex; nucleus of stria terminalis; primary motor cortex; dorsal striatum; prefrontal cortex; More reference expression data
BioGPS	More reference expression data
Orthologs
Databases	NCBI: entry; OMA: entry
Species	Human	Mouse
Entrez	7102	21912
Ensembl	ENSG00000156298	ENSMUSG00000058254
UniProt	P41732	Q62283
RefSeq (mRNA)	NM_004615	NM_019634
RefSeq (protein)	NP_004606	NP_062608
Location (UCSC)	Chr X: 38.56 – 38.69 Mb	Chr X: 10.35 – 10.46 Mb
PubMed search
- Wikidata
View/Edit Human	View/Edit Mouse

Tetraspanin-7 is a protein that in humans is encoded by the TSPAN7 gene.

The protein encoded by this gene is a member of the transmembrane 4 superfamily, also known as the tetraspanin family. Most of these members are cell-surface proteins that are characterized by the presence of four hydrophobic domains. The proteins mediate signal transduction events that play a role in the regulation of cell development, activation, growth and motility. This encoded protein is a cell surface glycoprotein and may have a role in the control of neurite outgrowth. It is known to complex with integrins. This gene is associated with X-linked mental retardation and neuropsychiatric diseases such as Huntington's chorea, fragile X syndrome and myotonic dystrophy. More recently, it has been identified as a key immune system target in type 1 diabetes.
