= IQSEC2-related disorder =

- Other names: IQSEC2-related syndrome; IQSEC2-related encephalopathy; Neurodevelopmental disorder, X-linked, with poor or absent speech and behavioral abnormalities (NEDXSB); Severe intellectual disability-progressive postnatal microcephaly-midline stereotypic hand movements syndrome
- Specialty: Medical genetics, neurology
- Symptoms: Intellectual disability, early-onset epilepsy, developmental delay, autistic traits
- Complications: Refractory seizures, speech regression
- Usual onset: Infancy / early childhood
- Causes: Mutation in the IQSEC2 gene
- Diagnostic method: Whole exome sequencing, genetic epilepsy panels
- Differential diagnosis: Rett syndrome, Angelman syndrome, Pitt-Hopkins syndrome, HNRNPH2-related disorder
- Treatment: Anti-seizure medications, physical therapy, occupational therapy, speech therapy
- Prognosis: Variable; lifelong supportive care required
- Frequency: Less than 1 in 1,000,000

IQSEC2-related disorder is a rare, X-linked neurodevelopmental disorder caused by pathogenic variants in the IQSEC2 gene. Symptoms include global developmental delay, moderate to profound intellectual disability, early-onset epilepsy, low muscle tone (hypotonia), behavioral abnormalities, and autistic traits. Affected individuals often experience absent or severely delayed speech, sleep disturbances, and repetitive hand movements (stereotypies), with males often presenting more severe impairments than females.

Diagnosis is made through molecular genetic testing, and management focuses on supportive therapies and anti-seizure medications. The condition is ultra-rare, with a prevalence of less than 1 in 1,000,000 worldwide.

== Signs and symptoms ==
IQSEC2-related disorder and its clinical manifestations vary considerably between individuals. Reported symptoms differ in frequency, with moderate to profound intellectual disability being the most consistently reported characteristic of the condition, while developmental delay and limited or absent speech are also frequently reported. Clinical severity may also vary by sex, with males generally exhibiting more severe manifestations than females. In milder cases, which happen most often in females the condition may present with only intellectual disability or autism spectrum traits without seizures or physical abnormalities.

=== Behavioral traits ===
Common behavioral manifestations include autism-like features, anxiety, self-injurious behavior, and unexplained crying episodes. Other traits reported in clinical studies include behaviors similar to ADHD, sleep disturbances, episodes of sudden laughter, and mood changes.

=== Neurological ===
Neurological symptoms include early-onset epilepsy, low muscle tone (hypotonia), excessive or involuntary movement (hyperkinesia), and repetitive hand movements (stereotypies). Other neurological signs reported in studies include difficulty with balance and walking (ataxia), impaired hand use, loss of previously learned physical and mental skills (psychomotor regression), and reduced pain sensitivity.

=== Growth and craniofacial features ===
Growth-related abnormalities are reported, including slowed head growth after birth resulting in small head size (postnatal microcephaly), short stature and failure to thrive. Distinct craniofacial features have also been observed in some affected individuals, such as crossed eyes (strabismus) and an asymmetrical or flattened head shape (plagiocephaly).

== Causes and mechanism ==
IQSEC2-related disorder is inherited in an X-linked manner, though most cases arise from spontaneous (de novo) mutations rather than being inherited from a parent.

IQSEC2-related disorder is caused by mutations in the IQSEC2 gene, located on the short arm of the X chromosome (Xp11.22). The condition is inherited in an X-linked pattern, affecting hemizygous males and heterozygous females. Most cases arise from de novo (spontaneous) variants instead of being inherited from a parent. The IQSEC2 gene was proposed as a cause for neurological dysfunction in 2008. Since then, over 70 variants have been found to cause the condition as of 2024. Null mutations, such as deletions, frameshift, or nonsense mutations, account for most of reported cases, alongside missense and splice-site variants.

IQSEC2 creates guanine nucleotide exchange factor (GEF) proteins. This protein interacts with Arf6 protein, which controls how nerve cells develop and how they communicate. And during early childhood, many connections are developed. Normally, the brain destroys unnecessary connections so the brain can communicate more efficiently; this is known as synaptic pruning. When IQSEC2 is mutated or deleted, this process does not work properly. As a result, nerve cells do not mature properly and synaptic pruning happens less. These disorganized pathways cause the condition.

== Diagnosis ==
Because no physical symptom uniquely identifies IQSEC2-related disorder, diagnosis is confirmed through molecular genetic testing such as whole exome sequencing or targeted epilepsy and intellectual disability gene panels to detect a disease-causing variant in the IQSEC2 gene. Magnetic resonance imaging (MRI) of the brain often shows nonspecific white matter changes, thinning of the corpus callosum, and mild generalized cerebral atrophy.

=== Differential diagnosis ===
Symptoms of IQSEC2-related disorder overlap considerably with several other neurodevelopmental disorders, most notably Rett syndrome, Angelman syndrome, and Pitt–Hopkins syndrome, as well as HNRNPH2-related disorder. Shared clinical features such as absent speech, early-onset seizures, small head size, and repetitive hand movements frequently lead to an initial clinical suspicion of Rett syndrome before genetic testing identifies an IQSEC2 mutation.

== Management ==
There is no cure for IQSEC2-related disorder; instead, care is entirely supportive and based on managing symptoms. Supportive therapies and symptomatic treatment are able to improve the quality of life for affected individuals. Antiepileptic medication can be used to control seizures in individuals. Specialized education programs and early intervention can support language development and learning. Physical and occupational therapy can also improve the ability to do daily activities such as walking.

== Prognosis ==
The functioning of individuals with the condition is highly variable. Some individuals are able to live on their own with minimal support, while others may need 24-hour care and support in daily life. Many are unable to walk, talk or understand commands. Most affected by the condition experience intellectual impairment at some level. Mental disorders such as depression, anxiety or schizophrenia may develop later in life.

== Epidemiology ==
IQSEC2-related disorder has an estimated prevalence of less than 1 in 1,000,000. As of 2023, approximately 100 cases have been described formally in medical literature. However, the condition is likely underdiagnosed, as roughly 2% of individuals with both epilepsy and intellectual disability who undergo whole-exome sequencing are found to carry a pathogenic variant in IQSEC2.
