= PHF8 =

Protein-coding gene in the species Homo sapiens

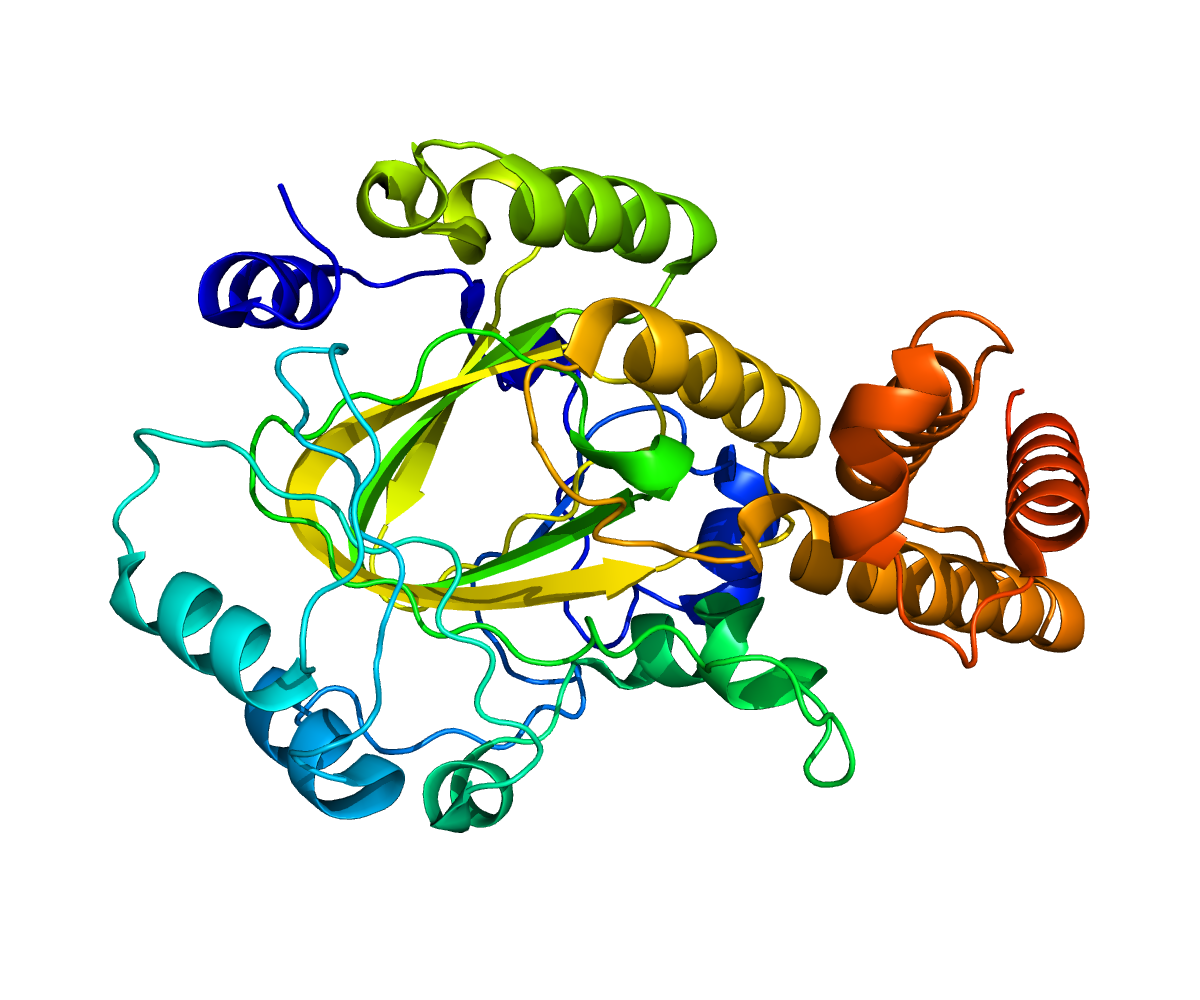

Identifiers
- Aliases: PHF8, JHDM1F, MRXSSD, ZNF422, PHD finger protein 8, KDM7B
- External IDs: OMIM: 300560; MGI: 2444341; GeneCards: PHF8
Available structures
| PDB | Ortholog search: PDBe RCSB |
| PDB | List of PDB id codes 4DO0, 3K3O, 2WWU, 3K3N, 3KV4,%%s2WWU, 3K3N, 3K3O, 3KV4, 4DO0 |
Enzyme activity
| EC # | BRENDA | ExPASy | KEGG | MetaCyc |
|---|---|---|---|---|
| 1.14.11.65 | ↗ | ↗ | ↗ | ↗ |

Gene location (Human)
| Chr. | X chromosome (human) |
| Band | Xp11.22 | Start | 53,936,676 bp |
| Band | Xp11.22 | End | 54,048,958 bp |

Gene location (Mouse)
| Chr. | X chromosome (mouse) |
| Band | X|X F3 | Start | 150,303,668 bp |
| Band | X|X F3 | End | 150,416,855 bp |
RNA expression pattern
| Bgee | Human / Mouse (ortholog); Top expressed in: right testis; sural nerve; left testis; testicle; tendon of biceps brachii; Achilles tendon; epithelium of colon; right lobe of liver; gonad; right uterine tube / Top expressed in: zygote; primary oocyte; otic vesicle; saccule; blood; secondary oocyte; otic placode; Gonadal ridge; granulocyte; medial ganglionic eminence; More reference expression data |
| BioGPS | n/a |
Gene ontology
| Molecular function | 2-oxoglutarate-dependent dioxygenase activity; iron ion binding; histone H3-methyl-lysine-9 demethylase activity; histone H4-methyl-lysine-20 demethylase activity; chromatin binding; dioxygenase activity; metal ion binding; methylated histone binding; protein binding; histone H3-methyl-lysine-36 demethylase activity; oxidoreductase activity; histone H3-tri/di-methyl-lysine-27 demethylase activity; histone demethylase activity; zinc ion binding |
| Cellular component | nuclear membrane; nucleoplasm; nucleolus; nucleus |
| Biological process | regulation of transcription, DNA-templated; histone H3-K27 demethylation; histone H3-K9 demethylation; histone H4-K20 demethylation; transcription, DNA-templated; positive regulation of transcription, DNA-templated; brain development; negative regulation of ribosomal DNA heterochromatin assembly; histone H3-K36 demethylation; cell cycle; positive regulation of transcription by RNA polymerase I; G1/S transition of mitotic cell cycle; chromatin organization |
Sources:Amigo / QuickGO
Orthologs
| Databases | NCBI: entry; OMA: entry |
| Species | Human | Mouse |
| Entrez | 23133 | 320595 |
| Ensembl | ENSG00000172943 | ENSMUSG00000041229 |
| UniProt | Q9UPP1 | Q80TJ7 |
| RefSeq (mRNA) | NM_001184896; NM_001184897; NM_001184898; NM_015107 | NM_001113354; NM_177201 |
| RefSeq (protein) | NP_001171825; NP_001171826; NP_001171827; NP_055922 | NP_001106825; NP_796175 |
| Location (UCSC) | Chr X: 53.94 – 54.05 Mb | Chr X: 150.3 – 150.42 Mb |
| PubMed search |
- Wikidata
| View/Edit Human | View/Edit Mouse |

PHD finger protein 8 is a protein that in humans is encoded by the PHF8 gene.

== Function ==
PHF8 belongs to the family of ferrous iron and alpha-ketoglutarate-dependent hydroxylases superfamily., and is active as a histone lysine demethylase with selectivity for the di-and monomethyl states. PHF8 induces an EMT (epithelial to mesenchymal transition)-like process by upregulating key EMT transcription factors SNAI1 and ZEB1.

== Regulation during differentiation ==
PHF8 was found to be expressional increased during endothelial differentiation and significantly decreased during cardial differentiation of murine embryonic stem cells.

== Clinical significance ==
Mutations in PHF8 cause Siderius type X-linked intellectual disability (XLMR) (OMIM: 300263). In addition to moderate intellectual disability, features of the Siderius-Hamel syndrome include facial dysmorphism, cleft lip and/or cleft palate, and in some cases microcephaly. A chromosomal microdeletion on Xp11.22 encompassing all of the PHF8 and FAM120C genes and a part of the WNK3 gene was reported in two brothers with autism spectrum disorder in addition to Siderius-type XLMR and cleft lip and palate.

This catalytic activity is disrupted by clinically known mutations to PHF8, which were found to cluster in its catalytic JmjC domain. The F279S mutation of PHF8, found in 2 Finnish brothers with mild intellectual disability, facial dysmorphism and cleft lip/palate, was found to additionally prevent nuclear localisation of PHF8 overexpressed in human cells.

The catalytic activity of PHF8 depends on molecular oxygen, a fact considered important with respect to reports on increased incidence of cleft lip/palate in mice that have been exposed to hypoxia during pregnancy. In humans, fetal cleft lip and other congenital abnormalities have also been linked to maternal hypoxia, as caused by e.g. maternal smoking, heavy maternal alcohol use, or maternal hypertension treatment.
