= HUWE1 =

Protein-coding gene in the species Homo sapiens

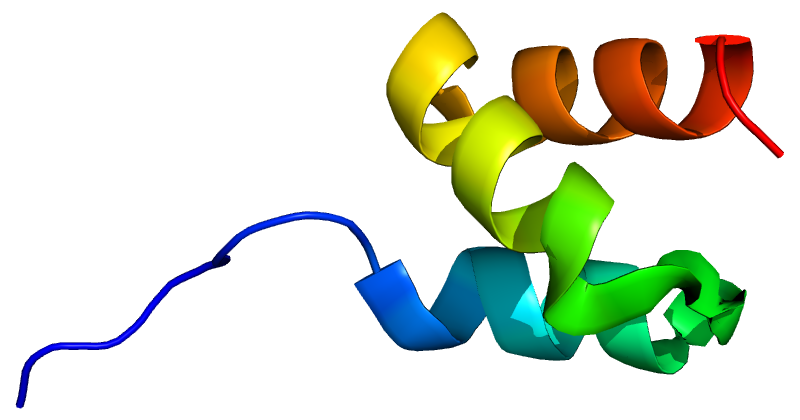

Identifiers
- Aliases: HUWE1, ARF-BP1, HECTH9, HSPC272, Ib772, LASU1, MULE, URE-B1, UREB1, HECT, UBA and WWE domain containing 1, E3 ubiquitin protein ligase, HECT, UBA and WWE domain containing E3 ubiquitin protein ligase 1, MRXST
- External IDs: OMIM: 300697; MGI: 1926884; GeneCards: HUWE1
Available structures
| PDB | Ortholog search: PDBe RCSB |
| PDB | List of PDB id codes 2EKK, 3G1N, 3H1D, 2MUL |
Enzyme activity
| EC # | BRENDA | ExPASy | KEGG | MetaCyc |
|---|---|---|---|---|
| 2.3.2.26 | ↗ | ↗ | ↗ | ↗ |

Gene location (Human)
| Chr. | X chromosome (human) |
| Band | Xp11.22 | Start | 53,532,096 bp |
| Band | Xp11.22 | End | 53,686,728 bp |

Gene location (Mouse)
| Chr. | X chromosome (mouse) |
| Band | X|X F3 | Start | 151,800,807 bp |
| Band | X|X F3 | End | 151,935,417 bp |
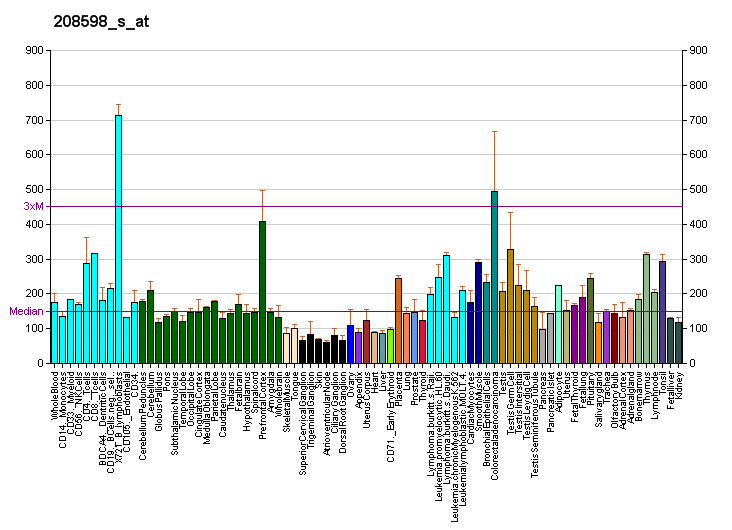

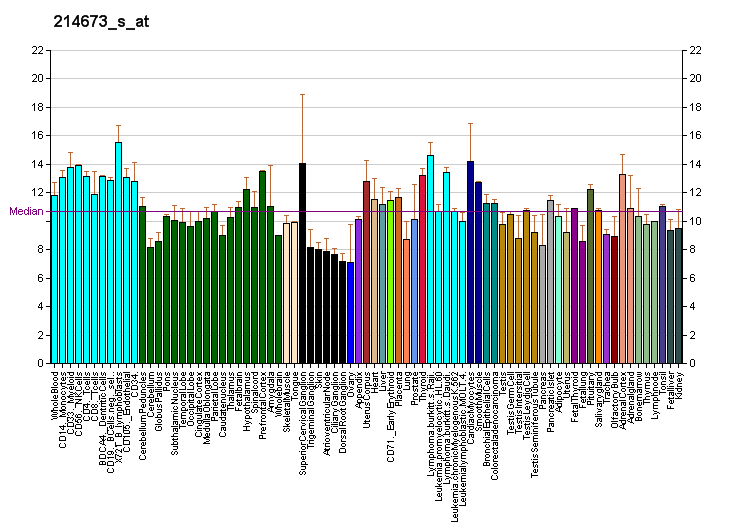
RNA expression pattern
| Bgee | Human / Mouse (ortholog); Top expressed in: skin of leg; skin of abdomen; right lobe of thyroid gland; anterior pituitary; right ovary; left lobe of thyroid gland; left ovary; ganglionic eminence; right hemisphere of cerebellum; ectocervix / Top expressed in: tail of embryo; genital tubercle; neural layer of retina; ventricular zone; entorhinal cortex; suprachiasmatic nucleus; dentate gyrus of hippocampal formation granule cell; epiblast; substantia nigra; perirhinal cortex; More reference expression data |
| BioGPS | More reference expression data |
Gene ontology
| Molecular function | DNA binding; protein binding; ubiquitin-protein transferase activity; RNA binding; transferase activity; ubiquitin protein ligase activity |
| Cellular component | cytoplasm; extracellular exosome; membrane; nucleoplasm; extracellular region; cytosol; secretory granule lumen; ficolin-1-rich granule lumen; nucleus |
| Biological process | cellular response to DNA damage stimulus; cell differentiation; protein monoubiquitination; histone ubiquitination; DNA repair; protein ubiquitination; base-excision repair; positive regulation of protein targeting to mitochondrion; protein polyubiquitination; neutrophil degranulation |
Sources:Amigo / QuickGO
Orthologs
| Databases | NCBI: entry; OMA: entry |
| Species | Human | Mouse |
| Entrez | 10075 | 59026 |
| Ensembl | ENSG00000086758 | ENSMUSG00000025261 |
| UniProt | Q7Z6Z7 | Q7TMY8 |
| RefSeq (mRNA) | NM_031407 | NM_021523 |
| RefSeq (protein) | NP_113584 | NP_067498 |
| Location (UCSC) | Chr X: 53.53 – 53.69 Mb | Chr X: 151.8 – 151.94 Mb |
| PubMed search |
- Wikidata
| View/Edit Human | View/Edit Mouse |

E3 ubiquitin-protein ligase HUWE1 is an enzyme that in humans is encoded by the HUWE1 gene.

It performs the third step (ligation) in binding ubiquitin to proteins in a process called ubiquitination which tags the proteins for disposal.

Human genetic studies that implicate HUWE1 in intellectual disability. Additional research suggests HUWE1 has implications in cancer research.
