= ZNF41 =

Protein-coding gene in the species Homo sapiens

Identifiers
- Aliases: ZNF41, MRX89, zinc finger protein 41
- External IDs: OMIM: 314995; GeneCards: ZNF41

Gene location (Human)
Chr.	X chromosome (human)
Band	Xp11.3	Start	47,445,178 bp
Band	Xp11.3	End	47,483,222 bp
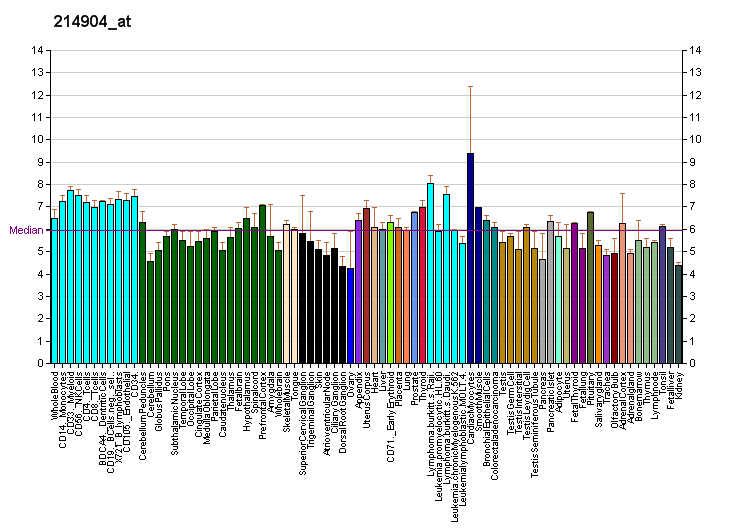
RNA expression pattern
Bgee	Human / Mouse (ortholog); Top expressed in: muscle of leg; gonad; gastrocnemius muscle; muscle of thigh; islet of Langerhans; apex of heart; rectum; ganglionic eminence; ventricular zone; white blood cell / n/a; More reference expression data
BioGPS	More reference expression data
Gene ontology
Molecular function	DNA-binding transcription factor activity; DNA binding; protein binding; metal ion binding; nucleic acid binding; DNA-binding transcription factor activity, RNA polymerase II-specific
Cellular component	intracellular anatomical structure; nucleus
Biological process	regulation of transcription, DNA-templated; transcription, DNA-templated; regulation of transcription by RNA polymerase II
Sources:Amigo / QuickGO
Orthologs
Databases	NCBI: entry; OMA: entry
Species	Human	Mouse
Entrez	7592	n/a
Ensembl	ENSG00000147124	n/a
UniProt	P51814	n/a
RefSeq (mRNA)	NM_007130; NM_153380; NM_001324139; NM_001324140; NM_001324141 NM_001324142; NM_001324143; NM_001324144; NM_001324145; NM_001324147; NM_001324148; NM_001324149; NM_001324150; NM_001324151; NM_001324152; NM_001324153; NM_001324154; NM_001324155; NM_001324156; NM_001324157	n/a
RefSeq (protein)	NP_001311068; NP_001311069; NP_001311070; NP_001311071; NP_001311072 NP_001311073; NP_001311074; NP_001311076; NP_001311077; NP_001311078; NP_001311079; NP_001311080; NP_001311081; NP_001311082; NP_001311083; NP_001311084; NP_001311085; NP_001311086; NP_009061; NP_700359	n/a
Location (UCSC)	Chr X: 47.45 – 47.48 Mb	n/a
PubMed search		n/a
- Wikidata
View/Edit Human

Zinc finger protein 41 is a protein that in humans is encoded by the ZNF41 gene.

This gene product is a likely zinc finger family transcription factor. It contains KRAB-A and KRAB-B domains that act as transcriptional repressors in related proteins, and multiple zinc finger DNA binding motifs and finger linking regions characteristic of the Kruppel family. This gene is part of a gene cluster on chromosome Xp11.23. Several alternatively spliced transcript variants have been described, however, the full-length nature of only some of them is known.
