= Super elongation complex =

Protein complex

The super elongation complex (SEC) is a protein complex that regulates the transcription of genes.

The SEC helps RNA polymerase II resume transcription after pausing near the start of a gene, allowing it to continue synthesizing RNA. Its dysregulation can promote abnormal transcription that results in cancer. In acute leukemia, KMT2A::AFF1 or KMT2A::MLLT1 fusion proteins can inappropriately recruit SEC components to KMT2A target genes, thus promoting sustained transcription of genes such as HOXA9 that drive leukemia.

Components of the super elongation complex include AFF1, MLLT1/ENL, ELL and the positive transcription elongation factor b (P-TEFb).

== See also ==
- KMT2A rearrangements
