= ELL (gene) =

Protein-coding gene in the species Homo sapiens

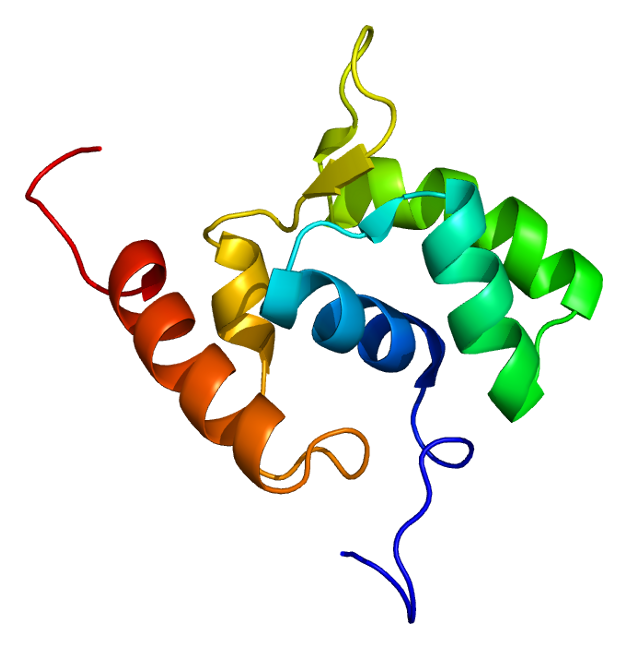

Identifiers
- Aliases: ELL, C19orf17, ELL1, MEN, PPP1R68, elongation factor for RNA polymerase II
- External IDs: OMIM: 600284; MGI: 109377; GeneCards: ELL
Available structures
PDB	Ortholog search: PDBe RCSB
PDB	List of PDB id codes 2DOA

Gene location (Human)
Chr.	Chromosome 19 (human)
Band	19p13.11	Start	18,442,663 bp
Band	19p13.11	End	18,522,116 bp

Gene location (Mouse)
Chr.	Chromosome 8 (mouse)
Band	8|8 B3.3	Start	70,992,107 bp
Band	8|8 B3.3	End	71,045,508 bp
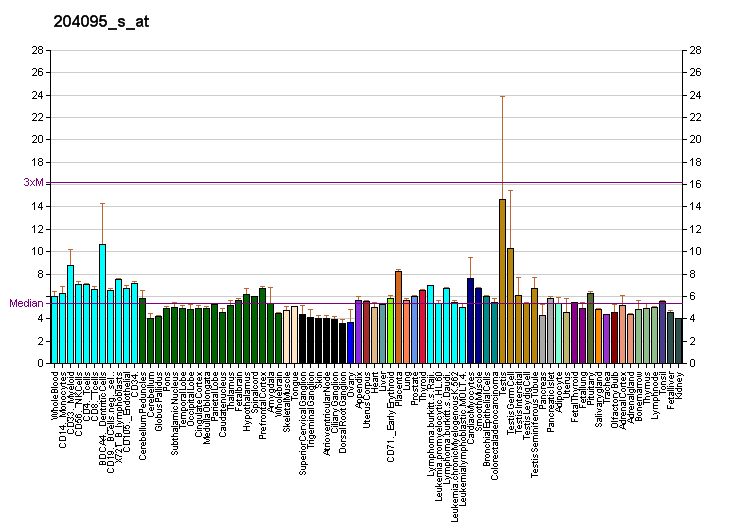

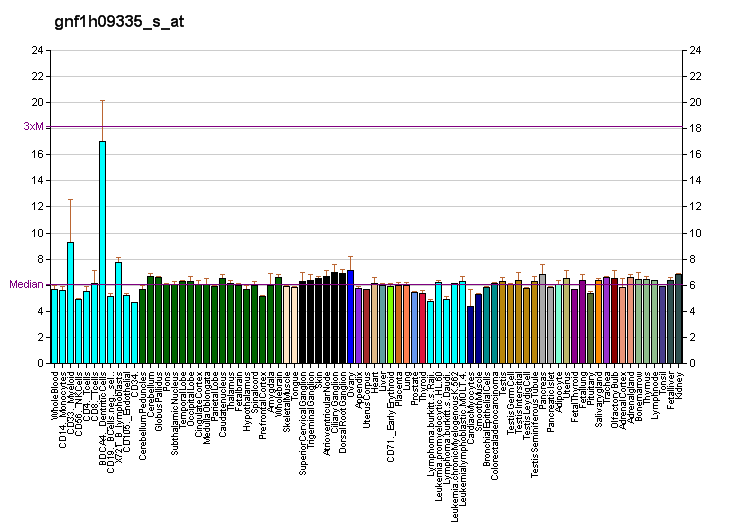

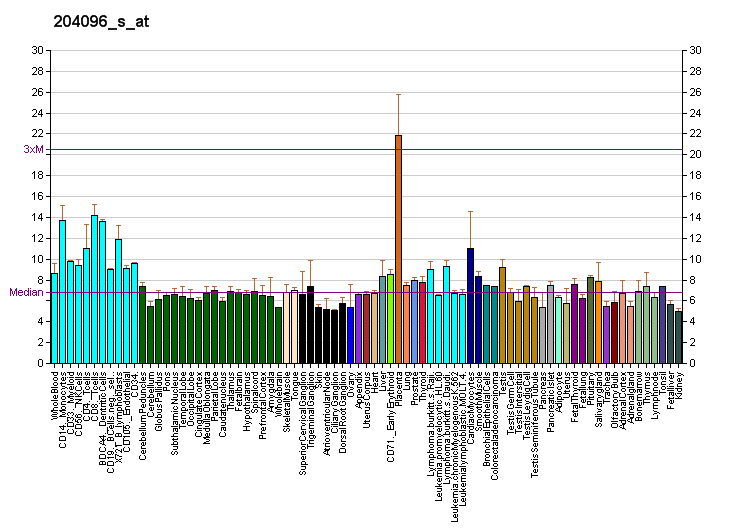
RNA expression pattern
Bgee	Human / Mouse (ortholog); Top expressed in: right testis; left testis; buccal mucosa cell; sperm; sural nerve; blood; granulocyte; gastrocnemius muscle; muscle of thigh; gonad / Top expressed in: Ileal epithelium; saccule; zygote; otic placode; secondary oocyte; otic vesicle; granulocyte; primary oocyte; muscle of thigh; lactiferous gland; More reference expression data
BioGPS	More reference expression data
Gene ontology
Molecular function	phosphatase binding; protein binding
Cellular component	Cajal body; nuclear speck; histone locus body; nucleoplasm; transcription elongation factor complex; nucleus
Biological process	regulation of transcription, DNA-templated; snRNA transcription by RNA polymerase III; negative regulation of phosphatase activity; transcription elongation from RNA polymerase II promoter; in utero embryonic development; transcription by RNA polymerase II; transcription, DNA-templated; positive regulation of DNA-templated transcription, elongation; positive regulation of transcription by RNA polymerase III; positive regulation of transcription elongation from RNA polymerase II promoter; snRNA transcription by RNA polymerase II
Sources:Amigo / QuickGO
Orthologs
Databases	NCBI: entry; OMA: entry
Species	Human	Mouse
Entrez	8178	13716
Ensembl	ENSG00000105656	ENSMUSG00000070002
UniProt	P55199	O08856
RefSeq (mRNA)	NM_006532	NM_007924
RefSeq (protein)	NP_006523	NP_031950
Location (UCSC)	Chr 19: 18.44 – 18.52 Mb	Chr 8: 70.99 – 71.05 Mb
PubMed search
- Wikidata
View/Edit Human	View/Edit Mouse

RNA polymerase II elongation factor ELL is an enzyme that in humans is encoded by the ELL gene.

== Interactions ==
ELL (gene) has been shown to interact with P53.
