= AFF3 =

Protein-coding gene in humans

Identifiers
- Aliases: AFF3, LAF4, MLLT2-like, AF4/FMR2 family member 3, KINS
- External IDs: OMIM: 601464; MGI: 106927; GeneCards: AFF3

Gene location (Human)
Chr.	Chromosome 2 (human)
Band	2q11.2	Start	99,545,419 bp
Band	2q11.2	End	100,192,428 bp

Gene location (Mouse)
Chr.	Chromosome 1 (mouse)
Band	1 B|1 16.58 cM	Start	38,216,407 bp
Band	1 B|1 16.58 cM	End	38,704,036 bp
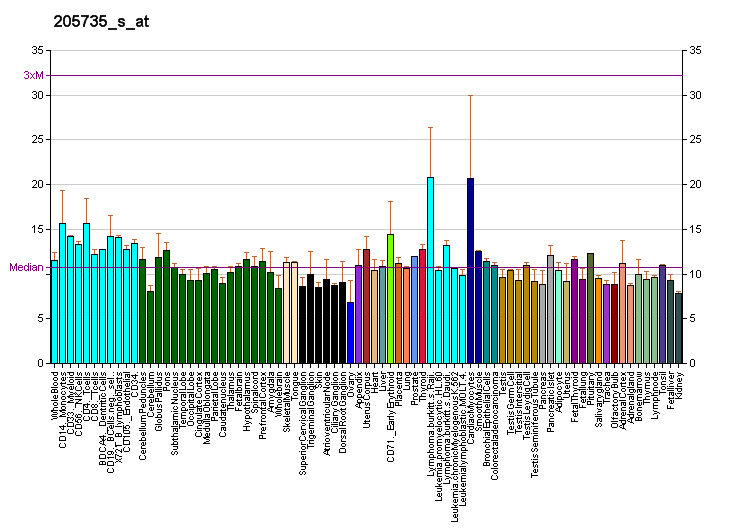

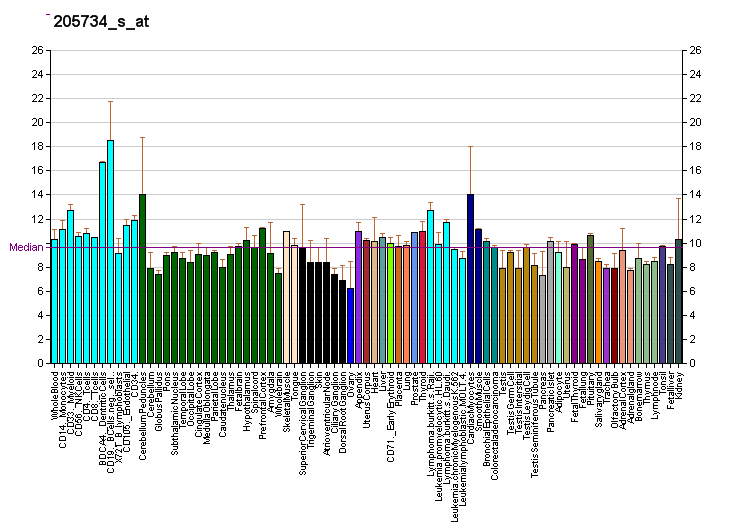
RNA expression pattern
Bgee	Human / Mouse (ortholog); Top expressed in: ganglionic eminence; postcentral gyrus; lower lobe of lung; lactiferous duct; pons; Achilles tendon; superior frontal gyrus; testicle; cerebellar vermis; lateral nuclear group of thalamus / Top expressed in: vas deferens; hand; ankle; Gonadal ridge; internal carotid artery; substantia nigra; external carotid artery; stria vascularis; Rostral migratory stream; sciatic nerve; More reference expression data
BioGPS	More reference expression data
Gene ontology
Molecular function	DNA binding; double-stranded DNA binding; DNA-binding transcription factor activity
Cellular component	nucleus; nucleoplasm; cytosol; nuclear body; transcription elongation factor complex; super elongation complex
Biological process	response to tumor necrosis factor; regulation of transcription, DNA-templated; transcription, DNA-templated; embryonic hindlimb morphogenesis
Sources:Amigo / QuickGO
Orthologs
Databases	NCBI: entry; OMA: entry
Species	Human	Mouse
Entrez	3899	16764
Ensembl	ENSG00000144218	ENSMUSG00000037138
UniProt	P51826	P51827
RefSeq (mRNA)	NM_001025108; NM_002285; NM_001386135	NM_001290814; NM_010678
RefSeq (protein)	NP_001020279; NP_002276	NP_001277743
Location (UCSC)	Chr 2: 99.55 – 100.19 Mb	Chr 1: 38.22 – 38.7 Mb
PubMed search
- Wikidata
View/Edit Human	View/Edit Mouse

AF4/FMR2 family member 3 is a protein that in humans is encoded by the AFF3 gene.

== Function ==
This gene encodes a tissue-restricted nuclear transcriptional activator that is preferentially expressed in lymphoid tissue. Isolation of this protein initially defined a highly conserved AF4/FMR2 family of nuclear transcription factors that may function in lymphoid development and oncogenesis. In some ALL patients, this gene has been found fused to the gene for MLL. Multiple alternatively spliced transcript variants that encode different proteins have been found for this gene.
