= IQSEC2 =

Protein-coding gene in the species Homo sapiens

Identifiers
- Aliases: IQSEC2, BRAG1, MRX1, MRX78, IQ motif and Sec7 domain 2, MRX18, IQ-ArfGEF, IQ motif and Sec7 domain ArfGEF 2, XLID1
- External IDs: OMIM: 300522; MGI: 3528396; GeneCards: IQSEC2

Gene location (Human)
Chr.	X chromosome (human)
Band	Xp11.22	Start	53,225,828 bp
Band	Xp11.22	End	53,321,350 bp

Gene location (Mouse)
Chr.	X chromosome (mouse)
Band	X F3|X 68.46 cM	Start	150,927,264 bp
Band	X F3|X 68.46 cM	End	151,008,232 bp
RNA expression pattern
Bgee	Human / Mouse (ortholog); Top expressed in: right hemisphere of cerebellum; right frontal lobe; gastrocnemius muscle; Brodmann area 9; prefrontal cortex; cingulate gyrus; anterior cingulate cortex; nucleus accumbens; right uterine tube; muscle of thigh / Top expressed in: interventricular septum; dentate gyrus of hippocampal formation granule cell; primary visual cortex; superior frontal gyrus; right kidney; myocardium of ventricle; proximal tubule; cerebellar cortex; hippocampus proper; extraocular muscle; More reference expression data
BioGPS	n/a
Orthologs
Databases	NCBI: entry; OMA: entry
Species	Human	Mouse
Entrez	23096	245666
Ensembl	ENSG00000124313	ENSMUSG00000041115
UniProt	Q5JU85	Q5DU25
RefSeq (mRNA)	NM_001111125; NM_001243197; NM_015075	NM_001005475; NM_001114664
RefSeq (protein)	NP_001104595; NP_001230126; NP_055890	NP_001005475; NP_001108136; NP_001392874; NP_001392875; NP_001392876 NP_001392877; NP_001392878; NP_001392879
Location (UCSC)	Chr X: 53.23 – 53.32 Mb	Chr X: 150.93 – 151.01 Mb
PubMed search
- Wikidata
View/Edit Human	View/Edit Mouse

IQ motif and Sec7 domain 2 is a protein that in humans is encoded by the IQSEC2 gene.

== Function ==
The IQSEC2 gene encodes a guanine nucleotide exchange factor for the ARF family of GTP-binding proteins (see for example ARF1).

== Clinical significance ==
Pathogenic variants in the IQSEC2 gene cause IQSEC2-related disorder, an X-linked neurodevelopmental disorder.
