= ARID domain =

ARID
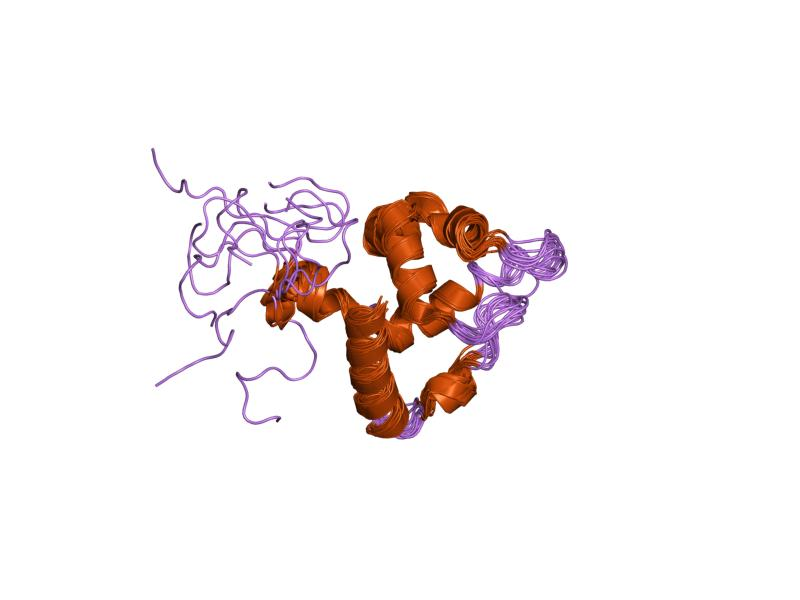
- human mrf-2 domain, nmr, 11 structures

Identifiers
- Symbol: ARID
- Pfam: PF01388
- InterPro: IPR001606
- SCOP2: 1ig6 / SCOPe / SUPFAM
Available protein structures:
- PDB: IPR001606 PF01388 (ECOD; PDBsum)
- AlphaFold: IPR001606; PF01388

In molecular biology, the ARID domain (AT-rich interaction domain; also known as BRIGHT (B-cell Regulator of Ig Heavy chain Transcription) domain)) is a protein domain that binds to DNA. ARID domain-containing proteins are found in fungi, plants and invertebrate and vertebrate metazoans. ARID-encoding genes are involved in a variety of biological processes including embryonic development, cell lineage gene regulation and cell cycle control. Although the specific roles of this domain and of ARID-containing proteins in transcriptional regulation are yet to be elucidated, they include both positive and negative transcriptional regulation and a likely involvement in the modification of chromatin structure. The basic structure of the ARID domain appears to be a series of six alpha-helices separated by beta-strands, loops, or turns, but the structured region may extend to an additional helix at either or both ends of the basic six. Based on primary sequence homology, they can be partitioned into three structural classes: Minimal ARID proteins that consist of a core domain formed by six alpha helices; ARID proteins that supplement the core domain with an N-terminal alpha-helix; and Extended-ARID proteins, which contain the core domain and additional alpha-helices at their N- and C-termini.

The human SWI-SNF complex protein ARID1A is an ARID family member with non-sequence-specific DNA binding activity. The ARID consensus and other structural features are common to both ARID1A and yeast SWI1, suggesting that ARID1A is a human counterpart of SWI1. The approximately 100-residue ARID sequence is present in a series of proteins strongly implicated in the regulation of cell growth, development, and tissue-specific gene expression. Although about a dozen ARID proteins can be identified from database searches, to date, only Bright (a regulator of B-cell-specific gene expression), dead ringer (a Drosophila melanogaster gene product required for normal development), and MRF-2 (which represses expression from the Cytomegalovirus enhancer) have been analyzed directly with regard to their DNA binding properties. Each binds preferentially to AT-rich sites. In contrast, ARID1A shows no sequence preference in its DNA binding activity, thereby demonstrating that AT-rich binding is not an intrinsic property of ARID domains and that ARID family proteins may be involved in a wider range of DNA interactions.
