= AF4/FMR2 family member 4 =

Transcription factor

AFF4

Identifiers
- Aliases: AFF4, AF5Q31, MCEF, CHOPS, AF4/FMR2 family member 4
- External IDs: OMIM: 604417; MGI: 2136171; GeneCards: AFF4
Available structures
PDB	Ortholog search: PDBe RCSB
PDB	List of PDB id codes 4IMY, 4OGR, 4OR5

Gene location (Human)
Chr.	Chromosome 5 (human)
Band	5q31.1	Start	132,875,395 bp
Band	5q31.1	End	132,963,634 bp

Gene location (Mouse)
Chr.	Chromosome 11 (mouse)
Band	11|11 B1.3	Start	53,241,660 bp
Band	11|11 B1.3	End	53,312,657 bp
RNA expression pattern
Bgee	Human / Mouse (ortholog); Top expressed in: germinal epithelium; sperm; amniotic fluid; gingival epithelium; mucosa of paranasal sinus; epithelium of nasopharynx; retinal pigment epithelium; visceral pleura; parietal pleura; tibia / Top expressed in: genital tubercle; arcuate nucleus; median eminence; paraventricular nucleus of hypothalamus; ventromedial nucleus; dorsomedial hypothalamic nucleus; lateral hypothalamus; pineal gland; tail of embryo; cerebellar vermis; More reference expression data
BioGPS	n/a
Gene ontology
Molecular function	protein binding; double-stranded DNA binding
Cellular component	transcription elongation factor complex; fibrillar center; nucleus; nucleoplasm; super elongation complex
Biological process	regulation of transcription, DNA-templated; transcription by RNA polymerase II; transcription, DNA-templated; spermatid development; transcription elongation from RNA polymerase II promoter
Sources:Amigo / QuickGO
Orthologs
Databases	NCBI: entry; OMA: entry
Species	Human	Mouse
Entrez	27125	93736
Ensembl	ENSG00000072364	ENSMUSG00000049470
UniProt	Q9UHB7	Q9ESC8
RefSeq (mRNA)	NM_014423	NM_033565; NM_001363331
RefSeq (protein)	NP_055238	NP_291043; NP_001350260
Location (UCSC)	Chr 5: 132.88 – 132.96 Mb	Chr 11: 53.24 – 53.31 Mb
PubMed search
- Wikidata
View/Edit Human	View/Edit Mouse

AF4/FMR2 family member 4 is a protein that in humans is encoded by the AFF4 gene (previously MCEF). It functions as a transcription factor and is related to Af4. It is the fourth member of the Af4 family (AFF) of transcription factors, involved in numerous pathologies, including Acute Lymphoblastic Leukemia (ALL), abnormal CNS development, breast cancer and azoospermia.

Because it apparently interacts with the species-specific human co-factor (P-TEFb) for HIV-1 transcription, and because it can repress HIV-1 replication, AFF4 (also known as MCEF) may have future therapeutic uses.

MCEF/AFF4 was originally cloned and named by Mario Clemente Estable of Ryerson University, while he was a post-doctoral fellow in the laboratory of Robert G. Roeder, at the Rockefeller University.

== See also ==
Transcription factors
