= Genetics of amyotrophic lateral sclerosis =

Association between genetics and ALS

There are more than 25 genes known to be associated with amyotrophic lateral sclerosis (ALS) as of June 2018, which collectively account for about 70% of cases of familial ALS (fALS) and 10% of cases of sporadic ALS (sALS). About 5–10% of cases of ALS are directly inherited. Overall, first-degree relatives of an individual with ALS have a 1% risk of developing ALS. ALS has an oligogenic mode of inheritance, meaning that mutations in two or more genes are required to cause disease.

C9orf72 is the most common gene associated with ALS, causing 40% of familial cases of ALS, as well as a small percentage of sporadic cases; it also causes about 25% of familial cases of frontotemporal dementia. The pathogenic mutation is a hexanucleotide repeat expansion (a series of six nucleotides repeated over and over); the more repeats in C9orf72, the more pathogenic the mutation. People without ALS tend to have fewer than 25 repeat units, while people with ALS due to a mutation in C9orf72 tend to have hundreds or thousands of repeat units. It is not clear exactly how many repeat units are needed to cause disease.

SOD1, which codes for superoxide dismutase 1, is the second most common gene associated with ALS and causes about 12% of familial cases and about 2% of sporadic cases. More than 150 mutations in SOD1 have been described, almost all of which have an autosomal dominant mode of inheritance.

TARDBP, which codes for TAR DNA-binding protein (TDP-43), is associated with 1–5% of familial ALS and less than 1% of sporadic ALS. While TARDBP mutations are somewhat rare in ALS, pathological aggregations of TDP-43 are seen in up to 97% of ALS patients and up to 50% of FTD patients. TDP-43 is involved in the repair of DNA double-strand breaks. It is recruited to DNA damage sites and interacts with proteins involved in the repair process of non-homologous end joining.

FUS, which codes for "Fused in sarcoma" protein, is associated with 1–5% of familial ALS and less than 1% of sporadic ALS. FUS is an RNA-binding protein with a similar function to TDP-43.

Some people have both ALS and frontotemporal dementia (FTD–ALS). The four main genes associated with FTD–ALS are C9orf72, CHCHD10, SQSTM1, and TBK1. C9orf72 repeat expansions explain about 40% of familial ALS and 25% of familial FTD; thus, C9orf72 provides a genetic explanation for most of the overlap between the two diseases. While about half of the people with ALS have some degree of cognitive impairment, only 10–15% have cognitive impairment severe enough to meet the criteria for frontotemporal dementia (FTD). Additionally, about 15% of people with FTD have symptoms of motor neuron dysfunction that resemble ALS. Mutations in TARDBP, FUS, C9orf72, and other genes can cause ALS as well as related forms of frontotemporal dementia (FTD–ALS). Proteins made by these genes appear to have prion-like activity and form inclusion bodies in some instances of ALS.

== Genes ==
As of May 2017 more than 20 genes have been associated with various types of ALS. As of 2016 these genes explained about 70% of familial ALS (fALS) and 15% of sporadic ALS (sALS). These associations include:

Type	OMIM (see references at OMIM link)	Gene	Locus	Inheritance	Year Identified	Remarks
ALS1	105400	SOD1	21q22.1	autosomal dominant, autosomal recessive	1993	The first gene associated with ALS, SOD1 accounts for about 12% of fALS and 1–2% of sALS. Susceptibility to ALS1 has also been linked to mutations in the following genes: DCTN1, PRPH, and NEFH.
ALS2	205100	ALS2	2q33.1	autosomal recessive	2001	Juvenile-onset
ALS3	606640	Unknown	18q21	autosomal dominant	—N/a	
ALS4	602433	SETX	9q34.13	autosomal dominant	1998	
ALS5	602099	SPG11	15q21.1	autosomal recessive	2010	Juvenile onset
ALS6	608030	FUS	16p11.2	autosomal dominant/recessive	2009	Impaired DNA damage response. Occurs in about 5% of familial and 1% of sporadic ALS cases.
ALS7	608031	Unknown	20p13	autosomal dominant	—N/a	
ALS8	608627	VAPB	20q13.3	autosomal dominant	2004	
ALS9	611895	ANG	14q11.2	autosomal dominant	2006	
ALS10	612069	TARDBP	1p36.2	autosomal dominant	2008	ALS with or without frontotemporal dementia. Impaired repair of DNA damage.
ALS11	612577	FIG4	6q21	autosomal dominant	2009	
ALS12	613435	OPTN	10p13	autosomal dominant/recessive	2010	
ALS13	183090	ATXN2	12q24.12	autosomal dominant	2010	Preliminary research indicates that intermediate-length CAG trinucleotide repeats in the ATXN2 gene may be associated with increased risk of ALS, whereas longer repeats cause spinocerebellar ataxia type 2
ALS14	613954	VCP	9p13.3	autosomal dominant	2010	Preliminary research indicates a possible link in ALS mechanism
ALS15	300857	UBQLN2	Xp11.21	X-linked dominant	2011	Described in one family
ALS16	614373	SIGMAR1	9p13.3	autosomal recessive	2011	Juvenile onset, very rare, described only in one family
ALS17	614696	CHMP2B	3p11.2	autosomal dominant	2006	Very rare, reported only in a handful of people
ALS18	614808	PFN1	17p13.2	autosomal dominant	2012	Very rare, described only in a handful of Chinese families
ALS19	615515	ERBB4	2q34	autosomal dominant	2013	Very rare, as of late 2013 described only in four people
ALS20	615426	HNRNPA1	12q13.13	autosomal dominant	2013	Very rare, as of late 2013 described only in two people
ALS21	606070	MATR3	5q31.2	autosomal dominant	2014	Associated with 0.5–2.0% of ALS cases.
ALS22	616208	TUBA4A	2q35	autosomal dominant	2014	Associated with 1% of fALS cases and 0.4% of sALS cases; not enough evidence to conclude it causes ALS or FTD as of 2018.
ALS23	617839	ANXA11	10q22.3	autosomal dominant	2017	Associated with 1% of fALS and 1.7% sALS cases; considered a causal gene.
ALS24	617892	NEK1	4q33	autosomal dominant	2016	Associated with 3–5% of ALS cases; considered an ALS risk gene rather than a causative gene as of 2018.
ALS25	617921	KIF5A	12q13.3	autosomal dominant	2018	
FTD-ALS1	105550	C9orf72	9p21.2	autosomal dominant	2011	The gene most commonly associated with ALS, C9orf72 accounts for 40% of fALS cases and 7% of sALS cases.
FTD-ALS2	615911	CHCHD10	22q11.23	autosomal dominant	2014	Associated with less than 1% of ALS-FTD cases and about 2% of fALS cases.
FTD-ALS3	616437	SQSTM1	5q35.3	autosomal dominant	2011	
FTD-ALS4	616439	TBK1	12q14.2	autosomal dominant	2015	Associated with 1.3% of ALS cases and 3–4% of ALS-FTD cases.
IBMPFD2	615422	HNRNPA2B1	7p15.2	autosomal dominant	2013	Proposed names: Inclusion body myopathy with early-onset Paget disease with or without frontotemporal dementia 2 (IBMPFD2); multisystem proteinopathy 2 (MSP2). Very rare, as of late 2013 described only in two people

=== Other genes ===
The following genes associated with ALS have been discussed in a June 2018 literature review, but have not yet been added to the Online Mendelian Inheritance in Man database.

Type	OMIM	Gene	Locus	Inheritance	Year Identified	Remarks
—N/a	—N/a	C21orf2	21q22.3	Unknown	2016	Associated with less than 1% of ALS cases.
—N/a	—N/a	CCNF	16p13.3	autosomal dominant	2016	Associated with 0.6%–3.3% of fALS-FTD cases.
—N/a	—N/a	TIA1	2p13.3	autosomal dominant	2017	Associated with 2% of fALS cases and less than 0.5% of sALS cases.

== SOD1 ==
In 1993, scientists discovered that mutations in the gene (SOD1) that produces the Cu-Zn superoxide dismutase (SOD1) enzyme were associated with around 20% of familial ALS and 5% of sporadic ALS. This enzyme is a powerful antioxidant that protects the body from damage caused by superoxide, a toxic free radical generated in the mitochondria. Free radicals are highly reactive molecules produced by cells during normal metabolism. Free radicals can cause damage to DNA and proteins within cells. To date, over 110 different mutations in SOD1 have been linked with the disorder, some of which (such as H46R) have a very long clinical course, while others, such as A4V, are exceptionally aggressive. When the defenses against oxidative stress fail, programmed cell death (apoptosis) is upregulated. To date, 180 different mutations in SOD1 gene are known to cause familial ALS.

A defect in SOD1 could be a loss or gain of function. A loss of SOD1 function could lead to an accumulation of DNA damage. A gain of SOD1 function could be toxic in other ways.

Aggregate accumulation of mutant SOD1 is suspected to play a role in disrupting cellular functions by damaging mitochondria, proteasomes, protein folding chaperones, or other proteins. Hypotheses proposed in explaining structural instability causing the misfold in the mutant SOD1 include, (1) glutamate excitotoxicity caused by reduced astroglial glutamate transporter EAAT2; (2) abnormalities of mitochondria in which increased misfolded SOD1 are deposited in the spinal cord mitochondria leading to defects in mitochondrial transport causing energy depletion, disruption in Ca2+ buffering, activating synaptic dysfunction, and loss of neurons; (3) impaired axonal structure or transport defects, in which neurotrophic signaling is lost, with defective anterograde and retrograde axonal transport observed in early pathogenesis, and (4) free radical-mediated oxidative stress causing cytotoxicity.

A 2016 paper proposed that SOD1 maturation and proteins regulating intracellular copper levels are potential therapeutic targets of SOD1-ALS.

The DNA oxidation product 8-oxoG is a well-established marker of oxidative DNA damage. 8-oxoG accumulates in the mitochondria of spinal motor neurons of persons with ALS. In transgenic ALS mice harboring a mutant SOD1 gene, 8-oxoG accumulates in mitochondrial DNA of spinal motor neurons. Thus oxidative damage to mitochondrial DNA of motor neurons due to altered SOD1 may be a significant factor in the etiology of ALS.

== UBQLN2, TARDBP ==
The UBQLN2 gene encodes production of the protein ubiquilin 2 in the cell, which is a member of the ubiquilin family and controls the degradation of ubiquitinated proteins. Mutations in UBQLN2 interfere with protein degradation, leading to neurodegeneration and causing dominantly inherited, chromosome X-linked ALS and ALS/dementia.

The TDP-43 protein, coded for by the TARDBP gene, is responsible for regulation of RNA expression. The discovery of mutations in the TARDBP gene, in relation to ALS, was the first proof that RNA processing defects lead to protein inclusions typical in RNA, and contribute to the pathogenesis of the disease. Other mutations that have been shown to be associated with ALS from GWAS include ATXN2, Nek1 and TBK1.

== TBK1, SQSTM1, OPTN ==
The TBK1, SQSTM1, and OPTN genes are involved in producing a maturing autophagosome during autophagy. In 2016, it was observed that mutations in the TBK1 protein contributed to formation of the disease. Since the TBK1 protein is haploinsufficient, meaning mutations in the gene result in no protein production. This results in no phosphorylation of the p62 and optineurin proteins. As a result, motor neurons can no longer produce a functional autophagosome leading to the inhibition of autophagy.

== C9orf72 ==
C9orf72 gene produces a protein that is involved in the trafficking of an autophagosome during autophagy. C9orf72 protein will associate with proteins SMCR8 and WDR41 and this behaves as the Rab GDP-GTP exchange factor in vesicular transport during autophagy. Mutations in the C9orf72 gene lead to inhibition of the formation of the C9orf72 protein preventing the active transport of the autophagsome leading to inhibition of autophagy.

== Mitochondria ==
Mitochondrial abnormalities, such as increased free radical production and impaired ATP production, have been observed but these mechanisms are unproven causes of ALS. SOD1 and TDP-43 mutations may play a role in causing mitochondria dysfunction.

Increased markers of oxidative stress have been observed in sporadic cases of ALS, including 8-Oxo-2'-deoxyguanosine and 4-hydroxynonenal. This hypothesis is further supported by various risk factors observed for ALS, such as trauma and exposure to certain chemicals that may play a role in increasing oxidative stress. However, failed trials with anti-oxidants and methodological limitation limit the hypothesis. One proposed mechanism of ALS incorporating both the genetic mutations of RNA binding proteins and oxidative stress, suggests that with age cells lose their ability to buffer against the genetic changes due to increasing oxidative stress resulting in the death of sensitive cells. A possible mechanism for dysregulation of glutaminergic neurotransmission may be through excessive oxidative stress of astrocytes.

Given the co-occurrence and symptomatic overlap with frontotemporal dementia, they may share an underlying pathophysiology, such as dysregulated microRNA activity (possibly originating in a TDP-43 mutation.) However authors cautioned against assuming a causal role of microRNA dysregulation.

== History ==
The first gene to be associated with ALS was SOD1, which was identified in 1993. It was the first time that linkage analysis was successful in identifying the genetic cause of a rare neurodegenerative disorder. SOD1 is one of the most common genes associated with ALS, accounting for about 12% of fALS and 1–2% of sALS. The second gene, NEFH, was identified in 1994, followed by SETX in 1998, ALS2 in 2001, DCTN1 in 2003, and CHMP2B in 2006. All of these genes are fairly rare; the next major ALS gene, TARDBP, was identified in 2008 and accounts for 4% of fALS and 1% of sALS. FUS was identified in 2009 and is seen in 4% of fALS and 1% of sALS. VCP was identified in 2010 and accounts for 1% of fALS and 1% of sALS; ATXN2, OPTN, and UBQLN2 were associated with ALS that same year.

Another major milestone was the discovery of C9orf72 in 2011, which is the most common gene associated with ALS, accounting for about 40% of fALS cases and 7% of sALS cases. C9orf72 was also found to contribute significantly to frontotemporal dementia (FTD). SQSTM1 was also identified in 2011, but accounts for 1% of fALS and less than 1% of sALS. PFN1 was identified in 2012, HNRNPA1 and HNRNPA2B1 in 2013, CHCHD10, MATR3, and TUBA4A in 2014, and TBK1 in 2015. C21orf2, CCNF, and NEK1 were associated with ALS in 2016.

The first genome-wide association study (GWAS) of ALS was published in 2007, and 14 GWASs total had been published through 2013. They have contributed significantly to our understanding of ALS genetics; for example, a 2010 GWAS studying ALS in Finland led to discovery of the role of mutations at the C9orf72 locus in ALS. However, a gene identified by a single GWAS may not actually be associated with ALS, especially if the cohort size is small. In outbred populations, thousands of cases (people with ALS) and controls (people without ALS) are required for a GWAS to have sufficient statistical power to confidently identify a gene's association with ALS.
