= Hereditary inclusion body myopathy =

Inherited genetic condition resulting in muscle weakness

- Other names: Hereditary inclusion body myopathy type 2

Hereditary inclusion body myopathies (HIBM) are a group of rare genetic disorders which have different symptoms. Generally, they are neuromuscular disorders characterized by muscle weakness developing in young adults. Hereditary inclusion body myopathies comprise both autosomal recessive and autosomal dominant muscle disorders that have a variable expression (phenotype) in individuals, but all share similar structural features in the muscles.

The term hereditary inclusion body myopathy (HIBM) was historically used to describe multiple distinct genetic conditions and is now considered antiquated; specific gene names are now used in disease nomenclature, such as GNE myopathy and VCP-associated multisystem proteinopathy.

HIBMs are a group of muscle wasting disorders that are uncommon in the general world population. One autosomal recessive form of HIBM is known as IBM2 or GNE myopathy, which is a common genetic disorder amongst people of Iranian Jewish descent. IBM2 has also been identified in other minorities throughout the world, including those of Asian, European, and South American, and Middle Eastern descent. In Japan and other East Asian countries, this disorder is known as distal myopathy with rimmed vacuoles (DMRV).

One autosomal dominant form of HIBM is known as VCP-associated multisystem proteinopathy, which in addition to affecting muscles, can also affect bone and/or the central nervous systems.

== Signs and symptoms ==
Some early signs of HIBMs include:

- Difficulty walking on heels, and difficulty running;
- Weak index finger;
- Frequent loss of balance.
- On muscle biopsy, the typical finding includes inclusion bodies, rimmed vacuoles, and accumulation of aberrant proteins similar to those found in senile plaques of Alzheimer's disease (amyloid beta, hyperphosphorylated tau, amongst others)

== Genetics ==
The different forms have different mutations and inheritance patterns. See the detailed descriptions for details

== Mechanisms ==
The exact mechanisms of these diseases are not well understood. GNE/MNK a key enzyme in the sialic acid biosynthetic pathway, and loss-of-function mutations in GNE/MNK may lead to a lack of sialic acid, which in turn could affect sialoglycoproteins. GNE knockout mice show problems similar to people with IBM and people with IBM dystroglycan have been found to lack sialic acid. However, the part of the dystroglycan that is important in muscle function does not seem to be affected. Another protein, neural cell adhesion molecule is under-sialyated in people with IBM, but as of 2016, it had no known role in muscle function.

== Diagnosis ==
The most useful information for accurate diagnosis is the symptoms and weakness pattern. If the quadriceps are spared but the hamstrings and iliopsoas are severely affected in a person between the ages of 20 - 40, it is very likely HIBM will be at the top of the differential diagnosis. The doctor may order any or all of the following tests to ascertain if a person has IBM2:

- Blood test for serum Creatine Kinase (CK or CPK);
- Nerve Conduction Study (NCS) / Electromyography (EMG);
- Muscle Biopsy;
- Magnetic Resonance Imaging (MRI) or Computer Tomography (CT) Scan to determine the true sparing of quadriceps;
- Blood Test or Buccal swab for genetic testing;

=== Classification ===
Types of hereditary inclusion body myopathy:

- IBM2 is the most common form, and is an autosomal recessive form, caused by mutations in the GNE gene; this form mainly affects leg muscles, but with an unusual distribution that spares the quadriceps. The incidence of this form is about 10 per million per year. There are two forms: a quadriceps sparing myopathy (autosomal recessive form of inclusion body myopathy) and Nonaka type distal myopathy (distal myopathy with rimmed vacuoles). While occurring worldwide it is most common in Jews of Persian origin. The GNE gene encodes the rate-limiting, bifunctional enzyme of sialic acid biosynthesis, uridine diphosphate-N-acetylglucosamine 2-epimerase/N-acetylmannosamine kinase. Disease occurs when both copies of the genome are nonfunctional. The pathophysiology is still unclear. Cardiac involvement may occur.
- IBM3 is a sometimes autosomal dominant and sometimes autosomal recessive form caused by mutations in MYHC2A; it is a relatively mild muscle disorder.
- Inclusion body myopathy with early-onset Paget disease and frontotemporal dementia (IBMPFD), now more commonly referred to as multisystem proteinopathy (MSP), is an autosomal dominant condition caused by mutations in VCP, HNRPA2B1 or HNRNPA1; it is a multisystem degenerative disorder that can affect muscle, bone, and/or the central nervous system.

The condition now called Desmin-related myofibrillar myopathy (also called myofibrillar myopathy-1) was formerly known as inclusion body myopathy 1 (IBM1).

More types of HIBMs, linked to other genes, may be identified in the future.

== Treatment ==
Treatment is palliative, not curative (as of 2009).

Treatment options for lower limb weakness such as foot drop can be through the use of Ankle Foot Orthoses (AFOs) which can be designed or selected by an Orthotist based upon the clinical need of the individual. Sometimes tuning of rigid AFOs can enhance knee stability.

== Prognosis ==
A 2009 review noted that muscle weakness usually begins after age 20 and after 20–30 years, the person usually requires a wheelchair for mobility. There was no mention of increased mortality.

== Research ==
Because lack of sialic acid appears to be part of the pathology of IBM caused by GNE mutations, clinical trials with sialic acid supplements, and with a precursor of sialic acid, N-Acetylmannosamine, have been conducted, and as of 2016 further trials were planned.

== History ==
Hereditary inclusion body myopathy (IBM) constitutes a unique group of neuromuscular disorders characterized by adult-onset slowly progressive distal and proximal weakness, and a typical muscle pathology including rimmed vacuoles and filamentous inclusions. Autosomal dominant (IMB3; OMIM 605637 ) and autosomal recessive (IBM2; OMIM 600737 ) forms have been described. The autosomal recessive form, first characterized in Jews of Persian descent, is a myopathy that affects mainly leg muscles, but with an unusual distribution that spares the quadriceps, so-called quadriceps-sparing myopathy (QSM). This disorder was subsequently found in other Middle Eastern families, the gene was mapped to 9p13-p12, and in 104 affected persons from 47 Middle Eastern families, the same mutation in homozygous state was found in the GNE gene. Affected individuals in families of other ethnic origins were found to be compound heterozygotes for other distinct mutations in the GNE gene. From OMIM 603824.

== See also ==
- Inclusion body myositis, a more common and non-hereditary form.
- Valosin-containing protein (VCP); mutations in VCP cause multisystem proteinopathy (MSP) which can present (among others) as a rare form of inclusion body myopathy.
