= CEP97 =

Protein-coding gene in the species Homo sapiens

Identifiers
- Aliases: CEP97, 2810403B08Rik, LRRIQ2, centrosomal protein 97
- External IDs: OMIM: 615864; MGI: 1921451; HomoloGene: 11579; GeneCards: CEP97; OMA:CEP97 - orthologs

Gene location (Human)
Chr.	Chromosome 3 (human)
Band	3q12.3	Start	101,724,593 bp
Band	3q12.3	End	101,770,562 bp

Gene location (Mouse)
Chr.	Chromosome 16 (mouse)
Band	16|16 C1.1	Start	55,720,251 bp
Band	16|16 C1.1	End	55,755,218 bp
RNA expression pattern
Bgee	Human / Mouse (ortholog); Top expressed in: corpus callosum; endothelial cell; mucosa of paranasal sinus; inferior ganglion of vagus nerve; oocyte; internal globus pallidus; secondary oocyte; superior vestibular nucleus; subthalamic nucleus; ventricular zone / Top expressed in: Rostral migratory stream; hand; otolith organ; utricle; thymus; cumulus cell; blood; pineal gland; ciliary body; spermatocyte; More reference expression data
BioGPS	n/a
Gene ontology
Molecular function	protein binding; calmodulin binding
Cellular component	centrosome; cytoskeleton; microtubule organizing center; cytoplasm; cytosol; protein-containing complex
Biological process	cell projection organization; negative regulation of cilium assembly; regulation of mitotic spindle assembly; ciliary basal body-plasma membrane docking
Sources:Amigo / QuickGO
Orthologs
Species	Human	Mouse
Entrez	79598	74201
Ensembl	ENSG00000182504	ENSMUSG00000022604
UniProt	Q8IW35	Q9CZ62
RefSeq (mRNA)	NM_001303401; NM_024548	NM_001159364; NM_001159365; NM_001159366; NM_028815
RefSeq (protein)	NP_001290330; NP_078824	NP_001152836; NP_001152837; NP_001152838; NP_083091
Location (UCSC)	Chr 3: 101.72 – 101.77 Mb	Chr 16: 55.72 – 55.76 Mb
PubMed search
- Wikidata
View/Edit Human	View/Edit Mouse

Centrosomal protein of 97 kDa (Cep97), also known as leucine-rich repeat and IQ domain-containing protein 2 (LRRIQ2), is a protein that in humans is encoded by the CEP97 gene.

Cep97 along with CP110 inhibit generation of cilia.
