= Multisystem proteinopathy =

- Specialty: Neurology

Multisystem proteinopathy (MSP) is a rare, inherited degenerative disease characterized by progressive dysfunction across multiple organ systems, primarily affecting muscle, bone, and the nervous system. Multisystem proteinopathy is an adult-onset, genetically heterogenous disease An individual with MSP typically develops one or more of these more common diseases: amyotrophic lateral sclerosis (ALS), frontotemporal dementia (FTD), inclusion body myopathy (IBM), Paget's disease of bone (PDB). The most common cause of MSP is a missense mutation affecting the valosin-containing protein (VCP) gene, but at least four other genes have been identified.

== History ==
Historically, several different names have been used to describe MSP, most commonly "inclusion body myopathy with early-onset Paget disease and frontotemporal dementia (IBMPFD)" or "inclusion body myopathy with frontotemporal dementia, Paget's disease of bone, and amyotrophic lateral sclerosis (IBMPFD/ALS)." However, IBMPFD and IBMPFD/ALS are now considered outdated classifications and are more properly referred to as MSP, as the disease is clinically heterogeneous and its phenotypic spectrum extends beyond IBM, PDB, FTD, and ALS to include motor neuron disease, Parkinson's disease features, and ataxia features. Although MSP is rare, growing interest in this syndrome derives from the molecular insights the condition provides into the etiological relationship between common age-related degenerative diseases of muscle, bone, and brain.

== Signs and symptoms ==
Multisystem proteinopathy (MSP) is a spectrum disease with a variety of conditions affecting patients over the course of a patient's life. The signs and symptoms of MSP, by organ system, are:

Muscle: Inclusion body myopathy, a progressive muscle weakness, is typically the first symptom experienced by MSP patients. Symptoms include difficulty walking up and down stairs, foot drop, balance issues, a waddling gait, and an inability to walk. Patients can also develop progressive upper mobility challenges like difficulty lifting arms, scapular winging, trunk weakness and hand function. MSP patients may also experience muscle pain, muscle cramps and muscle spasms.

Skeletal: Paget's disease of bone affects about half of MSP patients. Caused by excessive bone turn-over, this bone disease can cause bone pain, bone fractures, loss of hearing, and bone deformities.

Cognitive: Approximately one third of MSP patients are affected by frontotemporal dementia (FTD). Common signs and symptoms of FTD in MSP patients include significant changes in behavior, disinhibition, apathy, dysregulation of emotions, and language difficulties. Alzheimer's disease and mixed cognitive impairment have also been reported in MSP patients in more isolated cases.

Respiratory: MSP patients may experience respiratory dysfunction. Common symptoms of respiratory dysfunction include dyspnea, weak cough, aspiration, sleep disordered breathing, respiratory infections, and respiratory failure.

Motor neurons: MSP patients may develop motor neuron disease or ALS. Common symptoms of ALS include progressive muscle weakness, muscle tremors, fasciculations, respiratory dysfunction, swallowing issues, weight loss, and speech difficulties. Many of the symptoms associated with ALS, like muscle weakness and respiratory dysfunction, overlap with other clinical presentations of MSP.

Central Nervous System: A few MSP patients have been reported to develop Parkinsonism symptoms such as tremors, rigidity, and slowed movements.

Peripheral Nerves: Charcot-Marie Tooth disease, a length dependent neuropathy characterized by a high arch in the foot, has been reported in isolated cases of VCP associated MSP. Additionally, one study has shown that around 40% of VCP patients experienced a loss of sensation and tingling of their extremities.

Cardiac: Diastolic dysfunction and cardiomyopathy, characterized by weakened heart muscle, has been reported in some MSP patients

Bulbar: MSP patients may experience bulbar disfunction, like difficulty swallowing.

Autonomic: MSP patients may experience issues bladder and/or bowel function including urgency and incontinence.

== Causes ==
Multisystem proteinopathy is caused by a pathogenetic variant in one of the MSP genes, inherited in an autosomal dominant pattern. In a small percentage of patients, the disease may have been caused by a de novo (spontaneous) mutation.

== Genetics ==
The most common cause of MSP is a missense mutation affecting the valosin-containing protein (VCP) gene, which causes a subtype of MSP known as MSP1 (OMIM: 167320). MSP1 has been associated with more than 100 heterozygous missense pathogenic variants in VCP. A chart of the MSP1 genotype-phenotype correlations has been published in a review article.

Other pathogenic variants have been identified in HNRNPA2B1, HNRNPA1 and p62/SQSTM1, which cause MSP2 (OMIM: 615422), MSP3 (OMIM: 615424), and MSP4 (OMIM: 601530), respectively. Additional genes linked to MSP include MATR3, OPTN.

== Diagnosis ==
The diagnosis of multisystem proteinopathy is based on the results of genetic testing. Genetic testing for VCP and the other MSP genes is recommended if a person is experiencing one or more of the classical clinical presentations of MSP. A physical examination and the patient's medical history will help the doctor determine the particular clinical presentations the patient has developed.

== Pathology ==
The histopathology of tissues affected by MSP includes ubiquitin-positive cytoplasmic inclusions of RNA-binding proteins, such as TDP-43, HNRNPA1, HNRNPA2B1, and other components of RNA granules and proteins that mediate ubiquitin-dependent autophagy, including p62/SQSTM1, VCP, optineurin, and ubiquilin-2.

Specifically in MSP1 patients with myopathy, the main pathological hallmark is the presence of ubiquitin-positive protein aggregates in muscle tissues of patients affected by myopathy and, in patients with frontotemporal dementia, the main pathological hallmark is intranuclear TDP-43+ inclusions. Based on pathologic findings in several tissue types, abnormal protein clearance is a major mechanism that causes disease in MSP1 patients.

== Screening and surveillance ==
The proper screening and surveillance for the various conditions associated with MSP has been developed and published by a consortium of clinical experts. This recommendation includes a physical examination by a neuromuscular specialist, a nuclear bone scan for Paget's disease, a neurocognitive test and brain MRI for FTD, a cardiac MRI or echocardiogram for heart function, and respiratory monitoring.

== Management and treatment ==
There is no cure or disease modifying therapy for MSP. However, the bone pain associated with Paget's disease of bone can be treated with bisphosphonates.

It is recommended that MSP patients be followed by a multidisciplinary clinic and a care team that includes a neurologist, physical therapist, occupational therapist, speech and language pathologist, respiratory therapist, and social worker. The care team can help a MSP patient manage the various symptoms including limb and bulbar weakness, respiratory dysfunction, and muscle cramps.

The use of adaptive equipment or the use of energy-conservation can help improve a patient's quality of life and independence with daily tasks. Occupational therapy may implement changes to a person's environment, both at home or work, to increase the individual's function and accessibility. A respiratory therapist can monitor and modify respiratory interventions as a patient's condition changes.

== Research and advocacy ==
Cure VCP Disease is involved in research, advocacy, and services for individuals affected by multisystem proteinopathy. The organization provides resources that contribute to understanding and addressing this condition.
