= CCNF =

Protein-coding gene in humans

Identifiers
- Aliases: CCNF, FBX1, FBXO1, cyclin F, FTDALS5
- External IDs: OMIM: 600227; MGI: 102551; GeneCards: CCNF

Gene location (Human)
| Chr. | Chromosome 16 (human) |
| Band | 16p13.3 | Start | 2,429,394 bp |
| Band | 16p13.3 | End | 2,458,854 bp |

Gene location (Mouse)
| Chr. | Chromosome 17 (mouse) |
| Band | 17 A3.3|17 12.32 cM | Start | 24,441,172 bp |
| Band | 17 A3.3|17 12.32 cM | End | 24,470,458 bp |
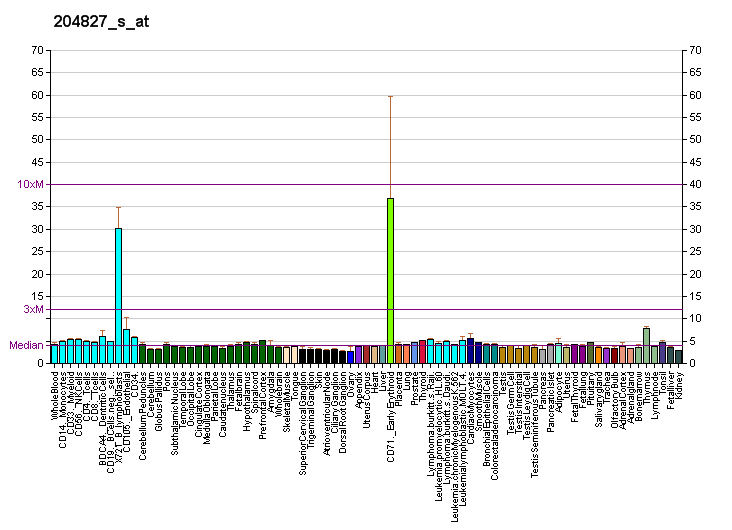

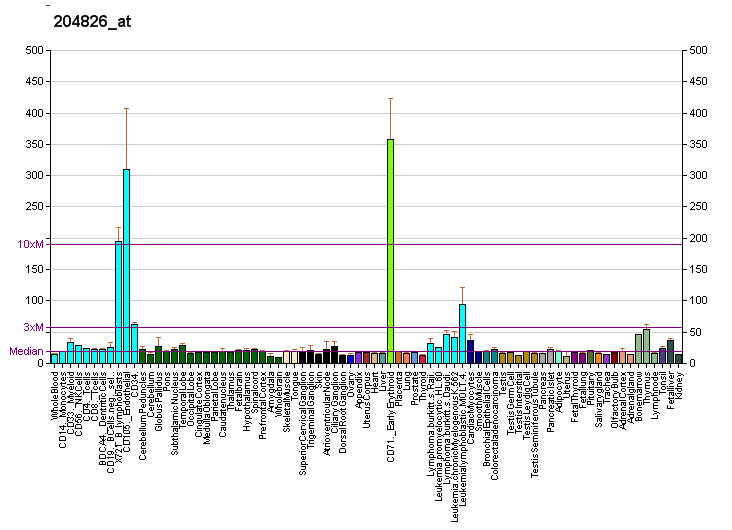
RNA expression pattern
| Bgee | Human / Mouse (ortholog); Top expressed in: gonad; trabecular bone; ventricular zone; epithelium of nasopharynx; bone marrow; glutes; embryo; bone marrow cell; testicle; ganglionic eminence / Top expressed in: yolk sac; epiblast; tail of embryo; fetal liver hematopoietic progenitor cell; ventricular zone; primitive streak; tibiofemoral joint; genital tubercle; abdominal wall; thymus; More reference expression data |
| BioGPS | More reference expression data |
Gene ontology
| Molecular function | protein binding; ubiquitin-protein transferase activity; protein kinase activity; cyclin-dependent protein serine/threonine kinase regulator activity; protein kinase binding |
| Cellular component | nucleus; cytoskeleton; SCF ubiquitin ligase complex; centriole; cytoplasm; centrosome; cytosol; cell junction; cyclin-dependent protein kinase holoenzyme complex |
| Biological process | regulation of cell cycle; re-entry into mitotic cell cycle; protein ubiquitination; negative regulation of centrosome duplication; SCF-dependent proteasomal ubiquitin-dependent protein catabolic process; cell cycle; cell division; placenta development; protein polyubiquitination; post-translational protein modification; regulation of cyclin-dependent protein serine/threonine kinase activity; mitotic cell cycle; protein phosphorylation; regulation of mitotic nuclear division; positive regulation of cell population proliferation; positive regulation of cell cycle; mitotic cell cycle phase transition |
Sources:Amigo / QuickGO
Orthologs
| Databases | NCBI: entry; OMA: entry |
| Species | Human | Mouse |
| Entrez | 899 | 12449 |
| Ensembl | ENSG00000162063 | ENSMUSG00000072082 |
| UniProt | P41002 | P51944 |
| RefSeq (mRNA) | NM_001761; NM_001323538 | NM_007634 |
| RefSeq (protein) | NP_001310467; NP_001752 | NP_031660 |
| Location (UCSC) | Chr 16: 2.43 – 2.46 Mb | Chr 17: 24.44 – 24.47 Mb |
| PubMed search |
- Wikidata
| View/Edit Human | View/Edit Mouse |

CCNF may also mean Canonical conjunctive normal form in Boolean algebra.

G2/mitotic-specific cyclin-F is a protein that in humans is encoded by the CCNF gene.

== Function ==
This gene encodes a member of the cyclin family. Cyclins are important regulators of cell cycle transitions through their ability to bind and activate cyclin-dependent protein kinases. This member also belongs to the F-box protein family which is characterized by an approximately 40 amino acid motif, the F-box. The F-box proteins constitute one of the four subunits of the ubiquitin protein ligase complex called SCFs (SKP1-cullin-F-box), which are part of the ubiquitin-proteosome system (UPS). The F-box proteins are divided into 3 classes: Fbws containing WD-40 domains, Fbls containing leucine-rich repeats, and Fbxs containing either different protein-protein interaction modules or no recognizable motifs. The protein encoded by this gene belongs to the Fbxs class and it was one of the first proteins in which the F-box motif was identified.

== Discovery and gene/protein characteristics ==
CCNF gene was first discovered in 1994 by the Elledge laboratory while experimenting with Saccharomyces cerevisiae. At the same time, the Frischauf laboratory also identified cyclin F as a new cyclin during their search for new candidate genes for polycystic kidney. CCNF gene has 17 exons and is located at position 16p13.3 on the human chromosome. Its protein, cyclin F, is made up of 786 amino acids and has a predicted molecular weight of 87 kDa. Cyclin F is the main member of the F-box protein family, which has about 40 amino acid motif, forming the F-box.

Cyclin F most closely resembles cyclin A in terms of sequence and expression patterns. Moreover, it has additional shared features of cyclins, such as a PEST sequence, protein quantity, localization, cell cycle-regulated mRNA, and ability to influence cell cycle and progression. Cyclin F differs from other cyclins by its ability to monitor and regulate cell cycle without the need for cyclin-dependent kinases (CDKs). Instead, the Pagano laboratory found that cyclin F is the substrate receptor of an SCF ubiquitin ligase that ubiquitinates and directly interacts with downstream targets, such as CP110 and RRM2, through its hydrophobic patch.

== Expression patterns ==
Cyclin F mRNA is expressed in all human tissues, but at different quantities. It is found most abundantly in the nucleus, and the quantity levels vary during the different stages of cell cycle. Its expression pattern closely resembles the one from cyclin A. Cyclin F levels begin to rise during S phase and reaches its peak during G2.

== Role ==
Cyclin F interacts with other proteins that are important for centrosomal duplication, gene transcription, and DNA synthesis, stability and repair.

=== RRM2 ===
RRM2 is a ribonucleotide reductase (RNR), an enzyme responsible for the conversion of ribonucleotides into dNTPs. dNTPs are essential for DNA synthesis during DNA replication and repair. Cyclin F interacts with RRM2 to control the production of dNTPs in the cell to avoid genomic instability and frequency of mutations.

=== CP110 ===
Moreover, cyclin F located at the centrosomes are needed to regulate levels of CP110, a protein involved in centrosome duplication. The regulation of CP110 during G2, through ubiquitin mediated proteolysis, helps to prevent mitotic aberrations. by allowing only one centrosome replication per cell cycle.

=== NuSAP ===
NuSAP is a substrate of cyclin F that is involved in cell division. It is a microtubule-associated protein that is required for the spindle assembly process. Its function is to interact with microtubules and chromatin to create stabilization and cross-linking. A lack of NuSAP has been linked with an increase in mutations due to impaired chromosome alignment during metaphase, while an excess of NuSAP leads to mitotic arrest and microtubule bundling. Cyclin F help to control NUSAP abundance and is therefore essential to proper cell division.

=== SLBP ===
SLBP is a protein that controls the mRNAs encoding canonical histones and H2A.X, thereby synchronizing histone metabolism with the cell cycle. In the G2 phase of the cell cycle, SLBP is degraded via cyclin F to control H2A.X levels after genotoxic stress.

=== E2F1, E2F2, and E2F3A ===
E2F1, E2F2, and E2F3A are the three canonical activators of the E2F family of transcription factors. During G2, cyclin F targets all three activator E2Fs for degradation, thereby turning off a main cell-cycle transcriptional engine.

== Clinical significance ==
=== Neurodegenerative diseases ===
CCNF mutations have more recently been associated to neurodegenerative diseases such as frontotemporal dementia (FTD), amyotrophic lateral sclerosis (ALS), and co-morbid ALS-FTD. Whole-genome linkage analysis and genome sequencing identified CCNF to be linked to both familial and sporadic ALS patients. In vitro and in vivo studies using ALS-linked mutations in CCNF were also carried out. It was found that certain CCNF mutations caused increased ubiquitylation activity of cyclin F leading to abnormal ubiquitylation of proteins. In zebrafish, mutant CCNF fish showed motor neuron axonopathy and reduced motor response. ALS/FTD patient induced pluripotent stem cell -derived motor neurons expressing endogenous mutant CCNF had increased ubiquitylated proteins, likely decreasing the available free ubiquitin pool, which is essential for the protein degradation pathways that remove protein waste from motor neurons.

=== Cancer ===
Cyclin F has a tumor suppressor role because normal expression is involved in cell cycle regulation by inducing G2 arrest and preventing mitosis. Moreover, cyclin F through RRM2 and CP110 control centrosome duplication and reduce the frequency of genomic mutations. So far, mutations in CCNF and increased RRM2 expression have been identified in several human cancers.
