= Neurodegenerative disease =

Central nervous system disease

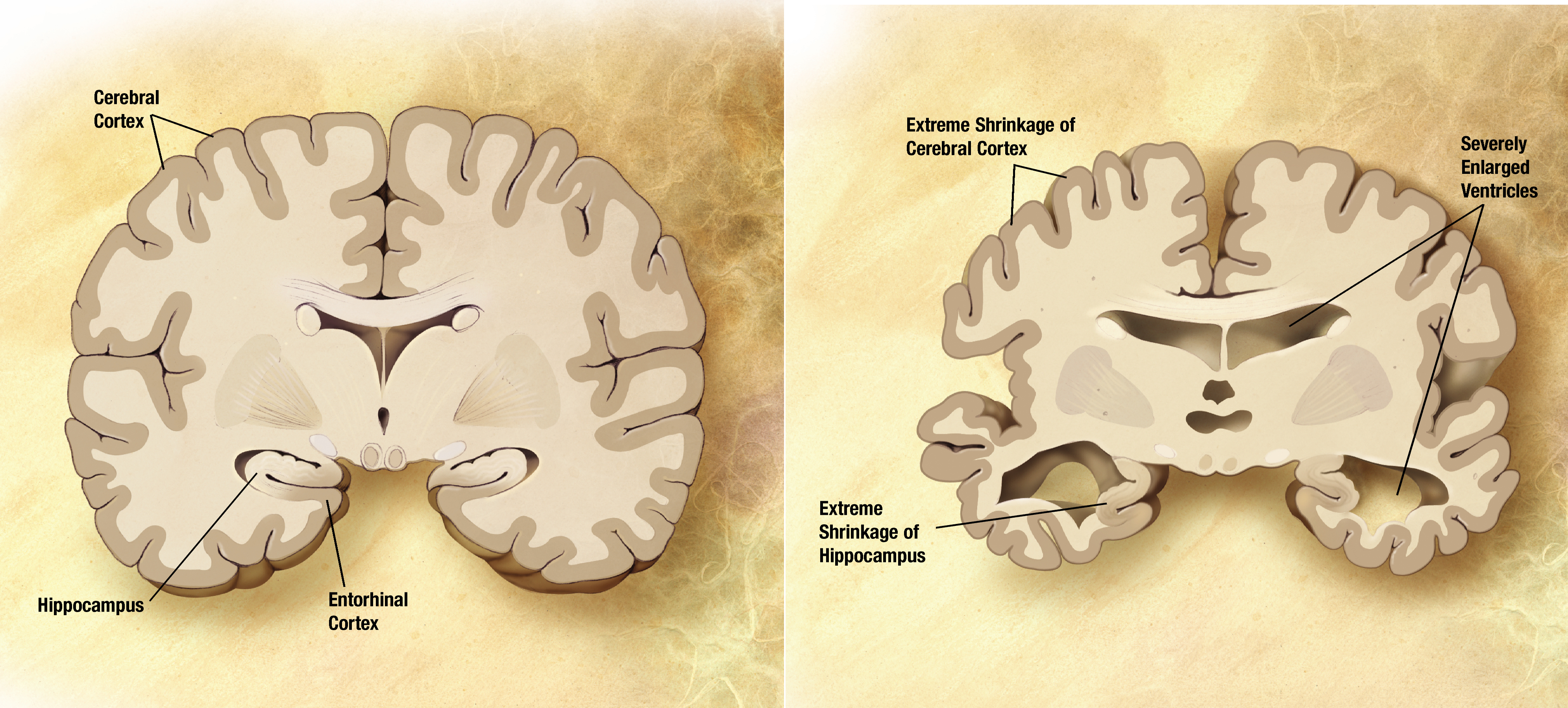
- Normal brain on left contrasted with structural changes shown in brain on right of person with Alzheimer's disease, the most common neurodegenerative disease
- Specialty: Neurology, Psychiatry

A neurodegenerative disease is caused by the progressive loss of neurons, in the process known as neurodegeneration. Neuronal damage may also ultimately result in their death. Neurodegenerative diseases include amyotrophic lateral sclerosis, multiple sclerosis, Parkinson's disease, Alzheimer's disease, Huntington's disease, multiple system atrophy, tauopathies, and prion diseases. Neurodegeneration can be found in the brain at many different levels of neuronal circuitry, ranging from molecular to systemic. Because there is no known way to reverse the progressive degeneration of neurons, these diseases are considered to be incurable; however, research has shown that the two major contributing factors to neurodegeneration are oxidative stress and inflammation. Biomedical research has revealed many similarities between these diseases at the subcellular level, including atypical protein assemblies (like proteinopathy) and induced cell death. These similarities suggest that therapeutic advances against one neurodegenerative disease might ameliorate other diseases as well.

Within neurodegenerative diseases, it is estimated that 55 million people worldwide had dementia in 2019, and that by 2050 this figure will increase to 139 million people.

== Specific disorders ==
The consequences of neurodegeneration can vary widely depending on the specific region affected, ranging from issues related to movement to the development of dementia.

=== Alzheimer's disease ===
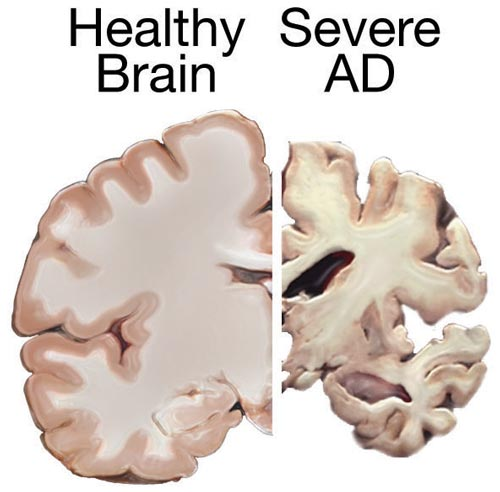
Comparison of brain tissue between healthy individual and Alzheimer's disease patient, demonstrating extent of neuronal death

Alzheimer's disease (AD) is a chronic neurodegenerative disease that results in the loss of neurons and synapses in the cerebral cortex and certain subcortical structures, resulting in gross atrophy of the temporal lobe, parietal lobe, and parts of the frontal cortex and cingulate gyrus. It is the most common neurodegenerative disease. Even with billions of dollars being used to find a treatment for Alzheimer's disease, no effective treatments have been found. Within clinical trials stable and effective AD therapeutic strategies have a 99.5% failure rate. Reasons for this failure rate include inappropriate drug doses, invalid target and participant selection, and inadequate knowledge of pathophysiology of AD. Currently, diagnoses of Alzheimer's is subpar, and better methods need to be utilized for various aspects of clinical diagnoses. Alzheimer's has a 20% misdiagnosis rate.

AD pathology is primarily characterized by the presence of amyloid plaques and neurofibrillary tangles. Plaques are made up of small peptides, typically 39–43 amino acids in length, called amyloid beta (also written as A-beta or Aβ). Amyloid beta is a fragment from a larger protein called amyloid precursor protein (APP), a transmembrane protein that penetrates through the neuron's membrane. APP appears to play roles in normal neuron growth, survival and post-injury repair. APP is cleaved into smaller fragments by enzymes such as gamma secretase and beta secretase. One of these fragments gives rise to fibrils of amyloid beta which can self-assemble into the dense extracellular amyloid plaques.

=== Parkinson's disease ===
Parkinson's disease (PD) is the second most common neurodegenerative disorder. It typically manifests as bradykinesia, rigidity, resting tremor and posture instability. The crude prevalence rate of PD has been reported to range from 15 per 100,000 to 12,500 per 100,000, and the incidence of PD from 15 per 100,000 to 328 per 100,000, with the disease being less common in Asian countries.

PD is primarily characterized by death of dopaminergic neurons in the substantia nigra, a region of the midbrain. The cause of this selective cell death is unknown. Notably, alpha-synuclein-ubiquitin complexes and aggregates are observed to accumulate in Lewy bodies within affected neurons. It is thought that defects in protein transport machinery and regulation, such as RAB1, may play a role in this disease mechanism. Impaired axonal transport of alpha-synuclein may also lead to its accumulation in Lewy bodies. Experiments have revealed reduced transport rates of both wild-type and two familial Parkinson's disease-associated mutant alpha-synucleins through axons of cultured neurons. Membrane damage by alpha-synuclein could be another Parkinson's disease mechanism.

The main known risk factor is age. Mutations in genes such as α-synuclein (SNCA), leucine-rich repeat kinase 2 (LRRK2), glucocerebrosidase (GBA), and tau protein (MAPT) can also cause hereditary PD or increase PD risk. While PD is the second most common neurodegenerative disorder, problems with diagnoses still persist. Problems with the sense of smell is a widespread symptom of Parkinson's disease (PD), however, some neurologists question its efficacy as a diagnostic tool. This assessment method is a source of controversy among medical professionals. The gut microbiome might play a role in the diagnosis of PD, and research suggests various ways that could revolutionize the future of PD treatment.

=== Huntington's disease ===
Huntington's disease (HD) is a rare autosomal dominant neurodegenerative disorder caused by mutations in the huntingtin gene (HTT). HD is characterized by loss of medium spiny neurons and astrogliosis. The first brain region to be substantially affected is the striatum, followed by degeneration of the frontal and temporal cortices. The striatum's subthalamic nuclei send control signals to the globus pallidus, which initiates and modulates motion. The weaker signals from subthalamic nuclei thus cause reduced initiation and modulation of movement, resulting in the characteristic movements of the disorder, notably chorea. Huntington's disease presents itself later in life even though the proteins that cause the disease works towards manifestation from their early stages in the humans affected by the proteins. Along with being a neurodegenerative disorder, HD has links to problems with neurodevelopment.

HD is caused by polyglutamine tract expansion in the huntingtin gene, resulting in the mutant huntingtin. Aggregates of mutant huntingtin form as inclusion bodies in neurons, and may be directly toxic. Additionally, they may damage molecular motors and microtubules to interfere with normal axonal transport, leading to impaired transport of important cargoes such as BDNF. Huntington's disease currently has no effective treatments that would modify the disease.

=== Multiple sclerosis ===
Multiple sclerosis (MS) is a chronic debilitating demyelinating disease of the central nervous system, caused by an autoimmune attack resulting in the progressive loss of myelin sheath on neuronal axons. The resultant decrease in the speed of signal transduction leads to a loss of functionality that includes both cognitive and motor impairment depending on the location of the lesion. The progression of MS occurs due to episodes of increasing inflammation, which is proposed to be due to the release of antigens such as myelin oligodendrocyte glycoprotein, myelin basic protein, and proteolipid protein, causing an autoimmune response. This sets off a cascade of signaling molecules that result in T cells, B cells, and macrophages crossing the blood-brain barrier and attacking myelin on neuronal axons leading to inflammation. Further release of antigens drives subsequent degeneration causing increased inflammation. Multiple sclerosis presents itself as a spectrum based on the degree of inflammation, a majority of patients experience early relapsing and remitting episodes of neuronal deterioration following a period of recovery. Some of these individuals may transition to a more linear progression of the disease, while about 15% of others begin with a progressive course on the onset of multiple sclerosis. The inflammatory response contributes to the loss of the grey matter, and as a result current literature devotes itself to combatting the auto-inflammatory aspect of the disease. While there are several proposed causal links between EBV and the HLA-DRB1*15:01 allele to the onset of MS – they may contribute to the degree of autoimmune attack and the resultant inflammation – they do not determine the onset of MS.

=== Amyotrophic lateral sclerosis ===
Amyotrophic lateral sclerosis (ALS), commonly referred to Lou Gehrig disease, is a rare neurodegenerative disorder characterized by the gradual loss of both upper motor neurons (UMNs) and lower motor neurons (LMNs). Although initial symptoms may vary, most patients develop skeletal muscle weakness that progresses to involve the entire body. The precise etiology of ALS remains unknown. In 1993, missense mutations in the gene encoding the antioxidant enzyme superoxide dismutase 1 (SOD1) were discovered in a subset of patients with familial ALS. More recently, TAR DNA-binding protein 43 (TDP-43) and Fused in Sarcoma (FUS) protein aggregates have been implicated in some cases of the disease, and a mutation in chromosome 9 (C9orf72) is thought to be the most common known cause of sporadic ALS. Early diagnosis of ALS is harder than with other neurodegenerative diseases as there are no highly effective means of determining its early onset. Currently, there is research being done regarding the diagnosis of ALS through upper motor neuron tests. The Penn Upper Motor Neuron Score (PUMNS) consists of 28 criteria with a score range of 0–32. A higher score indicates a higher level of burden present on the upper motor neurons. The PUMNS has proven quite effective in determining the burden that exists on upper motor neurons in affected patients.

Independent research provided in vitro evidence that the primary cellular sites where SOD1 mutations act are located on astrocytes. Astrocytes then cause the toxic effects on the motor neurons. The specific mechanism of toxicity still needs to be investigated, but the findings are significant because they implicate cells other than neuron cells in neurodegeneration.

=== Batten disease ===
Batten disease is a rare and fatal recessive neurodegenerative disorder that begins in childhood. Batten disease is the common name for a group of lysosomal storage disorders known as neuronal ceroid lipofuscinoses (NCLs) – each caused by a specific gene mutation, of which there are thirteen. Since Batten disease is quite rare, its worldwide prevalence is about 1 in every 100,000 live births. In North America, NCL3 disease (juvenile NCL) typically manifests between the ages of 4 and 7. Batten disease is characterized by motor impairment, epilepsy, dementia, vision loss, and shortened lifespan. Loss of vision is a common first sign of Batten disease. Loss of vision is typically preceded by cognitive and behavioral changes, seizures, and loss of the ability to walk. It is common for people to establish cardiac arrhythmias and difficulties eating food as the disease progresses. Batten disease diagnosis depends on a conflation of many criteria: clinical signs and symptoms, evaluations of the eye, electroencephalograms (EEG), and brain magnetic resonance imaging (MRI) results. The diagnosis provided by these results are corroborated by genetic and biochemical testing. It is only in recent years that more models have been created to expedite the research process for methods to treat Batten disease.

=== Creutzfeldt–Jakob disease ===
Creutzfeldt–Jakob disease (CJD) is a prion disease that is characterized by rapidly progressive dementia. Misfolded proteins called prions aggregate in brain tissue leading to nerve cell death. Variant Creutzfeldt–Jakob disease (vCJD) is the infectious form that comes from the meat of a cow that was infected with bovine spongiform encephalopathy, also called mad cow disease.

=== Chronic traumatic encephalopathy ===
Chronic traumatic encephalopathy (CTE) is a progressive neurodegenerative disease associated with repeated head impacts, including both concussive and subconcussive impacts. It is a form of tauopathy, characterized by the abnormal accumulation of hyperphosphorylated tau protein in neurons and astrocytes, particularly around small blood vessels at the depths of cortical sulci in an irregular distribution. This pathological process may contribute to progressive degeneration of brain tissue and impairment of neurological function.

Clinical manifestations of CTE include cognitive, behavioural, mood, and motor symptoms, such as memory impairment, impulsivity, depression, aggression, and problems with movement and coordination. Symptoms may develop years or decades after exposure to repetitive head trauma. CTE is definitively diagnosed through post-mortem neuropathological examination of brain tissue. The condition has been most frequently identified in individuals with histories of repeated head impacts, including contact sport athletes and military personnel. The relationship between repetitive head trauma, CTE pathology, and the development of clinical symptoms remains an active area of research.

== Risk factors ==
=== Aging ===
The greatest risk factor for neurodegenerative diseases is aging. Mitochondrial DNA mutations as well as oxidative stress both contribute to aging. Many of these diseases are late-onset, meaning there is some factor that changes as a person ages for each disease. One constant factor is that in each disease, neurons gradually lose function as the disease progresses with age. It has been proposed that DNA damage accumulation provides the underlying causative link between aging and neurodegenerative disease. About 20–40% of healthy people between 60 and 78 years old experience discernable decrements in cognitive performance in several domains including working, spatial, and episodic memory, and processing speed.

=== Infections ===
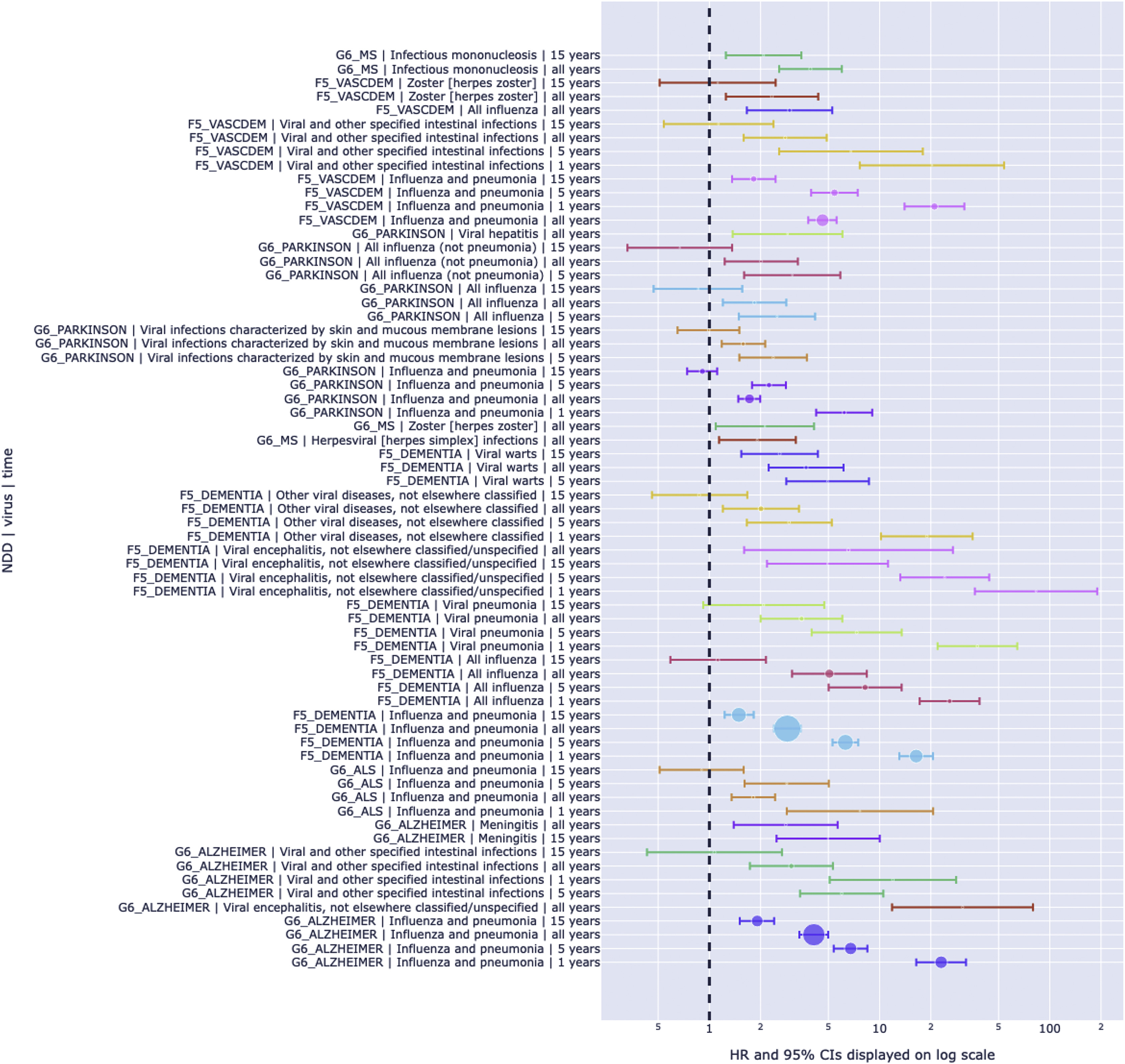
Risks from viral exposures according to one biobank study

A study using electronic health records indicates that 45 (with 22 of these being replicated with the UK Biobank) viral exposures can significantly elevate risks of neurodegenerative disease, including up to 15 years after infection.

== Mechanisms ==
=== Genetics ===
Many neurodegenerative diseases are caused by genetic mutations, most of which are located in completely unrelated genes. In many of the different diseases, the mutated gene has a common feature: a repeat of the CAG nucleotide triplet. CAG codes for the amino acid glutamine. A repeat of CAG results in a polyglutamine (polyQ) tract. Diseases associated with such mutations are known as trinucleotide repeat disorders.

Polyglutamine repeats typically cause dominant pathogenesis. Extra glutamine residues can acquire toxic properties through a variety of ways, including irregular protein folding and degradation pathways, altered subcellular localization, and abnormal interactions with other cellular proteins. PolyQ studies often use a variety of animal models because there is such a clearly defined trigger – repeat expansion. Extensive research has been done using the models of nematode (C. elegans), and fruit fly (Drosophila), mice, and non-human primates.

Nine inherited neurodegenerative diseases are caused by the expansion of the CAG trinucleotide and polyQ tract, including Huntington's disease and the spinocerebellar ataxias.

=== Epigenetics ===
The presence of epigenetic modifications for certain genes has been demonstrated in this type of pathology. An example is FKBP5 gene, which progressively increases its expression with age and has been related to Braak staging and increased tau pathology both in vitro and in mouse models of AD.

=== Protein misfolding ===
Several neurodegenerative diseases are classified as proteopathies as they are associated with the aggregation of misfolded proteins. Protein toxicity is one of the key mechanisms of many neurodegenerative diseases.

- alpha-synuclein: can aggregate to form insoluble fibrils in pathological conditions characterized by Lewy bodies, such as Parkinson's disease, dementia with Lewy bodies, and multiple system atrophy. Alpha-synuclein is the primary structural component of Lewy body fibrils. In addition, an alpha-synuclein fragment, known as the non-Abeta component (NAC), is found in amyloid plaques in Alzheimer's disease.
- tau: hyperphosphorylated tau protein is the main component of neurofibrillary tangles in Alzheimer's disease; tau fibrils are the main component of Pick bodies found in behavioral variant frontotemporal dementia.
- amyloid beta: the major component of amyloid plaques in Alzheimer's disease.
- prion: main component of prion diseases and transmissible spongiform encephalopathy.

=== Intracellular mechanisms ===
==== Protein degradation pathways ====
Parkinson's disease and Huntington's disease are both late-onset and associated with the accumulation of intracellular toxic proteins. Diseases caused by the aggregation of proteins are known as proteopathies, and they are primarily caused by aggregates in the following structures:

- cytosol, e.g. Parkinson's and Huntington's
- nucleus, e.g. Spinocerebellar ataxia type 1 (SCA1)
- endoplasmic reticulum (ER), (as seen with neuroserpin mutations that cause familial encephalopathy with neuroserpin inclusion bodies)
- extracellularly excreted proteins, amyloid-beta in Alzheimer's disease

There are two main avenues eukaryotic cells use to remove troublesome proteins or organelles:

- ubiquitin–proteasome: protein ubiquitin along with enzymes is key for the degradation of many proteins that cause proteopathies including polyQ expansions and alpha-synucleins. Research indicates proteasome enzymes may not be able to correctly cleave these irregular proteins, which could possibly result in a more toxic species. This is the primary route cells use to degrade proteins.
  - Decreased proteasome activity is consistent with models in which intracellular protein aggregates form. It is still unknown whether or not these aggregates are a cause or a result of neurodegeneration.
- autophagy–lysosome pathways: a form of programmed cell death (PCD), this becomes the favorable route when a protein is aggregate-prone meaning it is a poor proteasome substrate. This can be split into two forms of autophagy: macroautophagy and chaperone-mediated autophagy (CMA).
  - macroautophagy is involved with nutrient recycling of macromolecules under conditions of starvation, certain apoptotic pathways, and if absent, leads to the formation of ubiquinated inclusions. Experiments in mice with neuronally confined macroautophagy-gene knockouts develop intraneuronal aggregates leading to neurodegeneration.
  - chaperone-mediated autophagy defects may also lead to neurodegeneration. Research has shown that mutant proteins bind to the CMA-pathway receptors on lysosomal membrane and in doing so block their own degradation as well as the degradation of other substrates.

==== Membrane damage ====
Damage to the membranes of organelles by monomeric or oligomeric proteins could also contribute to these diseases. Alpha-synuclein can damage membranes by inducing membrane curvature, and cause extensive tubulation and vesiculation when incubated with artificial phospholipid vesicles. In addition, oligomeric α-synuclein species can form nanoscale pores in lipid membranes, further contributing to membrane disruption. The tubes formed from these lipid vesicles consist of both micellar as well as bilayer tubes. Extensive induction of membrane curvature is deleterious to the cell and would eventually lead to cell death. Apart from tubular structures, alpha-synuclein can also form lipoprotein nanoparticles similar to apolipoproteins.

==== Mitochondrial dysfunction ====
The most common form of cell death in neurodegeneration is through the intrinsic mitochondrial apoptotic pathway. This pathway controls the activation of caspase-9 by regulating the release of cytochrome c from the mitochondrial intermembrane space. Reactive oxygen species (ROS) are normal byproducts of mitochondrial respiratory chain activity. ROS concentration is mediated by mitochondrial antioxidants such as manganese superoxide dismutase (SOD2) and glutathione peroxidase. Over production of ROS (oxidative stress) is a central feature of all neurodegenerative disorders. In addition to the generation of ROS, mitochondria are also involved with life-sustaining functions including calcium homeostasis, PCD, mitochondrial fission and fusion, lipid concentration of the mitochondrial membranes, and the mitochondrial permeability transition. Mitochondrial disease leading to neurodegeneration is likely, at least on some level, to involve all of these functions.

There is strong evidence that mitochondrial dysfunction and oxidative stress play a causal role in neurodegenerative disease pathogenesis, including in four of the more well known diseases Alzheimer's, Parkinson's, Huntington's, and amyotrophic lateral sclerosis.

Neurons are particularly vulnerable to oxidative damage due to their strong metabolic activity associated with high transcription levels, high oxygen consumption, and weak antioxidant defense.

==== DNA damage ====
The brain metabolizes as much as a fifth of consumed oxygen, and reactive oxygen species produced by oxidative metabolism are a major source of DNA damage in the brain. Damage to a cell's DNA is particularly harmful because DNA is the blueprint for protein production and unlike other molecules it cannot simply be replaced by re-synthesis. The vulnerability of post-mitotic neurons to DNA damage (such as oxidative lesions or certain types of DNA strand breaks), coupled with a gradual decline in the activities of repair mechanisms, could lead to accumulation of DNA damage with age and contribute to brain aging and neurodegeneration. DNA single-strand breaks are common and are associated with the neurodegenerative disease ataxia-oculomotor apraxia. Increased oxidative DNA damage in the brain is associated with Alzheimer's disease and Parkinson's disease. Defective DNA repair has been linked to neurodegenerative disorders such as Alzheimer's disease, amyotrophic lateral sclerosis, ataxia telangiectasia, Cockayne syndrome, Parkinson's disease and xeroderma pigmentosum.

==== Axonal transport ====
Axonal swelling, and axonal spheroids have been observed in many different neurodegenerative diseases. This suggests that defective axons are not only present in diseased neurons, but also that they may cause certain pathological insult due to accumulation of organelles. Axonal transport can be disrupted by a variety of mechanisms including damage to: kinesin and cytoplasmic dynein, microtubules, cargoes, and mitochondria. When axonal transport is severely disrupted a degenerative pathway known as Wallerian-like degeneration is often triggered.

=== Programmed cell death ===
Programmed cell death (PCD) is death of a cell in any form, mediated by an intracellular program. This process can be activated in neurodegenerative diseases including Parkinson's disease, amytrophic lateral sclerosis, Alzheimer's disease and Huntington's disease. PCD observed in neurodegenerative diseases may be directly pathogenic; alternatively, PCD may occur in response to other injury or disease processes.

==== Apoptosis (type I) ====
Apoptosis is a form of programmed cell death in multicellular organisms. It is one of the main types of programmed cell death (PCD) and involves a series of biochemical events leading to a characteristic cell morphology and death.

- Extrinsic apoptotic pathways: Occur when factors outside the cell activate cell surface death receptors (e.g., Fas) that result in the activation of caspases-8 or -10.
- Intrinsic apoptotic pathways: Result from mitochondrial release of cytochrome c or endoplasmic reticulum malfunctions, each leading to the activation of caspase-9. The nucleus and Golgi apparatus are other organelles that have damage sensors, which can lead the cells down apoptotic pathways.

Caspases (cysteine-aspartic acid proteases) cleave at very specific amino acid residues. There are two types of caspases: initiators and effectors. Initiator caspases cleave inactive forms of effector caspases. This activates the effectors that in turn cleave other proteins resulting in apoptotic initiation.

==== Autophagic (type II) ====
Autophagy is a form of intracellular phagocytosis in which a cell actively consumes damaged organelles or misfolded proteins by encapsulating them into an autophagosome, which fuses with a lysosome to destroy the contents of the autophagosome. Because many neurodegenerative diseases show unusual protein aggregates, it is hypothesized that defects in autophagy could be a common mechanism of neurodegeneration.

==== Cytoplasmic (type III) ====
PCD can also occur via non-apoptotic processes, also known as Type III or cytoplasmic cell death. For example, type III PCD might be caused by trophotoxicity, or hyperactivation of trophic factor receptors. Cytotoxins that induce PCD can cause necrosis at low concentrations, or aponecrosis (combination of apoptosis and necrosis) at higher concentrations. It is still unclear exactly what combination of apoptosis, non-apoptosis, and necrosis causes different kinds of aponecrosis.

=== Transglutaminase ===
Transglutaminases are human enzymes ubiquitously present in the human body and in the brain in particular.

The main function of transglutaminases is bind proteins and peptides intra- and intermolecularly, by a type of covalent bonds termed isopeptide bonds, in a reaction termed transamidation or crosslinking.

Transglutaminase binding of these proteins and peptides make them clump together. The resulting structures are turned extremely resistant to chemical and mechanical disruption.

Most relevant human neurodegenerative diseases share the property of having abnormal structures made up of proteins and peptides.

Each of these neurodegenerative diseases have one (or several) specific main protein or peptide. In Alzheimer's disease, these are amyloid-beta and tau. In Parkinson's disease, it is alpha-synuclein. In Huntington's disease, it is huntingtin.

Transglutaminase substrates: Amyloid-beta, tau, alpha-synuclein and huntingtin have been proved to be substrates of transglutaminases in vitro or in vivo, that is, they can be bonded by trasglutaminases by covalent bonds to each other and potentially to any other transglutaminase substrate in the brain.

Transglutaminase augmented expression: It has been proved that in these neurodegenerative diseases (Alzheimer's disease, Parkinson's disease, and Huntington's disease) the expression of the transglutaminase enzyme is increased.

Presence of isopeptide bonds in these structures: The presence of isopeptide bonds (the result of the transglutaminase reaction) have been detected in the abnormal structures that are characteristic of these neurodegenerative diseases.

Co-localization: Co-localization of transglutaminase mediated isopeptide bonds with these abnormal structures has been detected in the autopsy of brains of patients with these diseases.

== Management ==
The process of neurodegeneration is not well understood, so the diseases that stem from it have, as yet, no cures.

=== Animal models in research ===
In the search for effective treatments (as opposed to palliative care), investigators employ animal models of disease to test potential therapeutic agents. Model organisms provide an inexpensive and relatively quick means to perform two main functions: target identification and target validation. Together, these help show the value of any specific therapeutic strategies and drugs when attempting to ameliorate disease severity. An example is the drug Dimebon by Medivation, Inc. In 2009 this drug was in phase III clinical trials for use in Alzheimer's disease, and also phase II clinical trials for use in Huntington's disease. In March 2010, the results of a clinical trial phase III were released; the investigational Alzheimer's disease drug Dimebon failed in the pivotal CONNECTION trial of patients with mild-to-moderate disease. With CONCERT, the remaining Pfizer and Medivation Phase III trial for Dimebon (latrepirdine) in Alzheimer's disease failed in 2012, effectively ending the development in this indication.

In another experiment using a rat model of Alzheimer's disease, it was demonstrated that systemic administration of hypothalamic proline-rich peptide (PRP)-1 offers neuroprotective effects and can prevent neurodegeneration in hippocampus amyloid-beta 25–35. This suggests that there could be therapeutic value to PRP-1.

=== Other avenues of investigation ===
Protein degradation is sometimes an option both in preventing the synthesis and degradation of irregular proteins. There is also interest in upregulating autophagy to clear protein aggregates implicated in neurodegeneration. Both options involve complex pathways that are only beginning to be understood.

The goal of immunotherapy is to enhance aspects of the immune system. Both active and passive vaccinations have been proposed for Alzheimer's disease and other conditions; however, more research must be done to prove safety and efficacy in humans.

A current therapeutic target for the treatment of Alzheimer's disease is the protease β-secretase, which is involved in the amyloidogenic processing pathway that leads to the pathological accumulation of proteins in the brain. When the gene that encodes for amyloid precursor protein (APP) is spliced by α-secretase rather than β-secretase, the toxic protein β amyloid is not produced. Targeted inhibition of β-secretase can potentially prevent the neuronal death that is responsible for the symptoms of Alzheimer's disease.

== See also ==
- Amyloid
- JUNQ and IPOD
- Neurodegeneration with brain iron accumulation
- Prevention of dementia
