= Desmin-related myofibrillar myopathy =

- Specialty: Rheumatology, neurology

Desmin-related myofibrillar myopathy, is a subgroup of the myofibrillar myopathy diseases and is the result of a mutation in the gene that codes for desmin which prevents it from forming protein filaments, instead forming aggregates of desmin and other proteins throughout the cell.

== Presentation ==
Common symptoms of the disease are weakness and atrophy in the distal muscles of the lower limbs which progresses to the hands and arms, then to the trunk, neck and face. Respiratory impairment often follows.

== Genetics ==
There are three major types of inheritance for this disease: Autosomal dominant, autosomal recessive and de novo.

- The most severe form is autosomal recessive and it also has the earliest onset. It usually involves all three muscle tissues and leads to cardiac and respiratory failure as well as intestinal obstruction.
- Autosomal Dominant inheritance shows a later onset and slower progression. It usually involves only one or two of the muscle tissues.
- De novo diseases occur when a new mutation arises in the person that was not inherited through either parent. This form has a wide range of symptoms and varies depending on the mutation made.

== Pathophysiology ==
The sarcomeres become misaligned and result in the disorganization of muscle fibers. This mutation also results in muscle cell death by apoptosis and necrosis. The muscle cell may also be disorganized because the aggregates may interrupt other filament structures and/or normal cellular function.

Desminopathies are very rare diseases and As of 2004 only 60 patients have been diagnosed, however this number probably does not accurately represent the population due to frequent mis or under diagnosis.

== Diagnosis ==
Desminopathies are diagnosed by genetic analysis. Because mutations in several further genes might be pathogenic for skeletal and cardiac myopathies, gene panels or whole exome sequence analysis are mostly used. Sanger sequencing is consequently used to verify NGS-data.

== Treatment ==
There is currently no cure for the disease but treatments to help the symptoms are available.

== Prognosis ==
Prognosis strongly depends on which subtype of disease it is. Some are deadly in infancy but most are late onset and mostly manageable.
