= TUBA4A =

Protein-coding gene in the species Homo sapiens

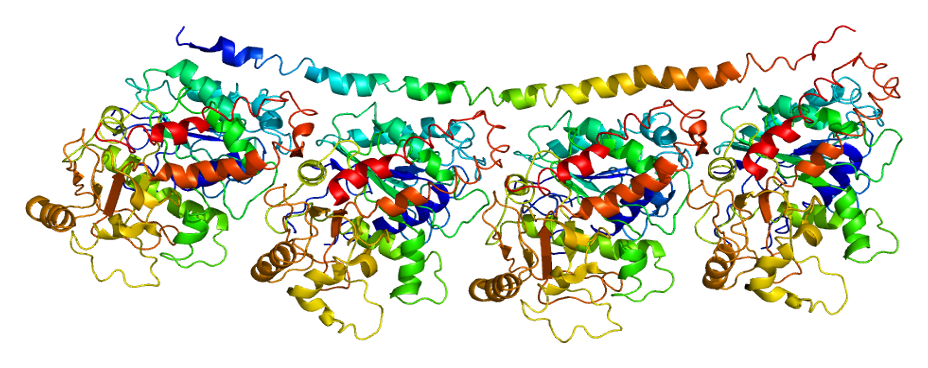

Identifiers
- Aliases: TUBA4A, H2-ALPHA, TUBA1, ALS22, tubulin alpha 4a
- External IDs: OMIM: 191110; MGI: 1095410; GeneCards: TUBA4A

Gene location (Human)
Chr.	Chromosome 2 (human)
Band	2q35	Start	219,249,710 bp
Band	2q35	End	219,277,902 bp

Gene location (Mouse)
Chr.	Chromosome 1 (mouse)
Band	1|1 C4	Start	75,190,872 bp
Band	1|1 C4	End	75,196,509 bp
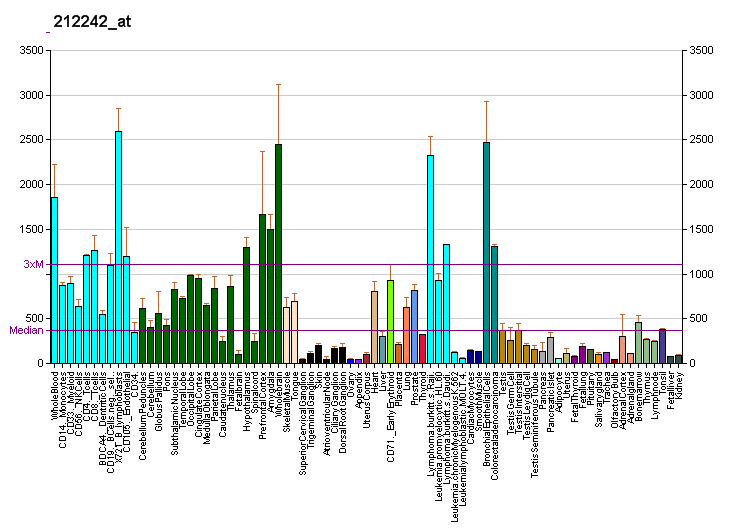
RNA expression pattern
Bgee	Human / Mouse (ortholog); Top expressed in: gingival epithelium; frontal pole; muscle of thigh; Brodmann area 10; skin of arm; body of tongue; nipple; spinal ganglia; gastrocnemius muscle; Skeletal muscle tissue of rectus abdominis / Top expressed in: motor neuron; ankle; right ventricle; aortic valve; triceps brachii muscle; vastus lateralis muscle; sternocleidomastoid muscle; tibiofemoral joint; temporal muscle; hair follicle; More reference expression data
BioGPS	More reference expression data
Gene ontology
Molecular function	nucleotide binding; GTP binding; structural constituent of cytoskeleton; protein binding; GTPase activity; enzyme binding; protein kinase binding
Cellular component	cytoplasm; cytosol; extracellular region; microtubule; extracellular exosome; cytoskeleton; microtubule cytoskeleton
Biological process	platelet degranulation; G2/M transition of mitotic cell cycle; microtubule-based process; cytoskeleton organization; ciliary basal body-plasma membrane docking; regulation of G2/M transition of mitotic cell cycle; microtubule cytoskeleton organization; mitotic cell cycle
Sources:Amigo / QuickGO
Orthologs
Databases	NCBI: entry; OMA: entry
Species	Human	Mouse
Entrez	7277	22145
Ensembl	ENSG00000127824	ENSMUSG00000026202
UniProt	P68366	P68368
RefSeq (mRNA)	NM_001278552; NM_006000	NM_009447; NM_001313723; NM_001313724
RefSeq (protein)	NP_001265481; NP_005991	NP_001300652; NP_001300653; NP_033473
Location (UCSC)	Chr 2: 219.25 – 219.28 Mb	Chr 1: 75.19 – 75.2 Mb
PubMed search
- Wikidata
View/Edit Human	View/Edit Mouse

Tubulin alpha-4A chain is a protein that in humans is encoded by the TUBA4A gene.

== Function ==
Microtubules of the eukaryotic cytoskeleton perform essential and diverse functions and are composed of a heterodimer of alpha and beta tubulin. The genes encoding these microtubule constituents are part of the tubulin superfamily, which is composed of six distinct families. Genes from the alpha, beta and gamma tubulin families are found in all eukaryotes. The alpha and beta tubulins represent the major components of microtubules, while gamma tubulin plays a critical role in the nucleation of microtubule assembly. There are multiple alpha and beta tubulin genes and they are highly conserved among and between species. This gene encodes an alpha tubulin that is a highly conserved homolog of a rat testis-specific alpha tubulin.

== Interactions ==
TUBA4A has been shown to interact with NCOA6 and APC.
