= RAB1 =

Rab GTPases are molecular switches that regulate membrane traffic. They are active in their GTP-bound form and inactive when bound to GDP. The GTPase YPT1, and its mammalian homologue Rab1, regulate membrane-tethering events on three different pathways: autophagy, ER-Golgi, and intra-Golgi traffic. In the yeast Saccharomyces cerevisiae, many of the ATG proteins needed for macroautophagy are shared with the biosynthetic cytoplasm to the vacuole-targeting (CVT) pathway that transports certain hydrolases into the vacuole. Both pathways require YPT1; however, only the macroautophagy pathway is conserved in higher eukaryotes. In the macroautophagy pathway, Rab1 mediates the recruitment of Atg1 to the PAS. Rab1 regulates macroautophagy by recruiting its effector, Atg1, to the PAS to tether Atg9 vesicles to each other or to other membranes.
