= GNE (gene) =

Protein-coding gene in humans

Identifiers
- Aliases: GNE, DMRV, GLCNE, IBM2, NM, Uae1, glucosamine (UDP-N-acetyl)-2-epimerase/N-acetylmannosamine kinase
- External IDs: OMIM: 603824; MGI: 1354951; GeneCards: GNE
Available structures
PDB	Ortholog search: PDBe RCSB
PDB	List of PDB id codes 2YHW, 2YHY, 2YI1, 3EO3, 4ZHT
Enzyme activity
EC #	BRENDA	ExPASy	KEGG	MetaCyc
2.7.1.60	↗	↗	↗	↗
3.2.1.183	↗	↗	↗	↗

Gene location (Human)
Chr.	Chromosome 9 (human)
Band	9p13.3	Start	36,214,441 bp
Band	9p13.3	End	36,277,042 bp

Gene location (Mouse)
Chr.	Chromosome 4 (mouse)
Band	4|4 B1	Start	44,034,075 bp
Band	4|4 B1	End	44,084,177 bp
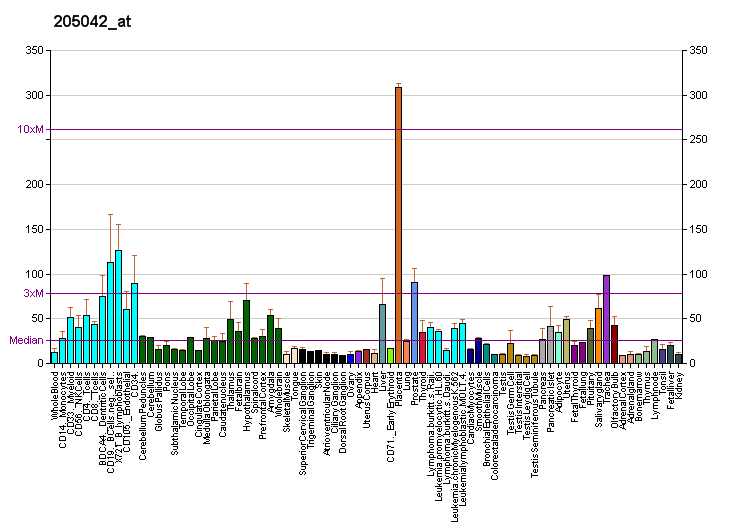
RNA expression pattern
Bgee	Human / Mouse (ortholog); Top expressed in: mucosa of sigmoid colon; nasal epithelium; rectum; liver; trachea; palpebral conjunctiva; islet of Langerhans; right lobe of liver; cartilage tissue; placenta / Top expressed in: submandibular gland; left colon; lacrimal gland; parotid gland; left lobe of liver; Ileal epithelium; Paneth cell; duodenum; conjunctival fornix; crypt of lieberkuhn of small intestine; More reference expression data
BioGPS	More reference expression data
Gene ontology
Molecular function	nucleotide binding; protein binding; hydrolase activity, hydrolyzing O-glycosyl compounds; kinase activity; ATP binding; catalytic activity; transferase activity; N-acylmannosamine kinase activity; hydrolase activity; metal ion binding; UDP-N-acetylglucosamine 2-epimerase activity
Cellular component	cytoplasm; cytosol
Biological process	phosphorylation; cell adhesion; N-acetylneuraminate metabolic process; metabolism; UDP-N-acetylglucosamine metabolic process; N-acetylglucosamine biosynthetic process; carbohydrate phosphorylation
Sources:Amigo / QuickGO
Orthologs
Databases	NCBI: entry; OMA: entry
Species	Human	Mouse
Entrez	10020	50798
Ensembl	ENSG00000159921	ENSMUSG00000028479
UniProt	Q9Y223	Q91WG8
RefSeq (mRNA)	NM_001128227; NM_001190383; NM_001190384; NM_001190388; NM_005476 NM_001374797; NM_001374798	NM_001190414; NM_015828; NM_001357539
RefSeq (protein)	NP_001121699; NP_001177312; NP_001177313; NP_001177317; NP_005467 NP_001361726; NP_001361727	NP_001177343; NP_056643; NP_001344468
Location (UCSC)	Chr 9: 36.21 – 36.28 Mb	Chr 4: 44.03 – 44.08 Mb
PubMed search
- Wikidata
View/Edit Human	View/Edit Mouse

Bifunctional UDP-N-acetylglucosamine 2-epimerase/N-acetylmannosamine kinase is an enzyme that in humans is encoded by the GNE gene.

The bifunctional enzyme, UDP-N-acetylglucosamine 2-epimerase (UDP-GlcNAc 2-epimerase/N-acetylmannosamine kinase) regulates and initiates biosynthesis of N-acetylneuraminic acid (NeuAc), a precursor of sialic acids. UDP-GlcNAc 2-epimerase activity is rate-limiting for the biosynthesis of sialic acid and is required for sialylation in hematopoietic cells. The activity of the enzyme can be controlled at the transcriptional level and can affect the sialylation and function of specific cell surface molecules expressed on B cells and myeloid cells. Modification of cell surface molecules with sialic acid is crucial for their function in many biologic processes, including cell adhesion and signal transduction. Differential sialylation of cell surface molecules is also implicated in the tumorigenicity and metastatic behavior of malignant cells. Sialuria is a rare inborn error of metabolism characterized by cytoplasmic accumulation and increased urinary excretion of free NeuAc.
