= MATR3 =

Mammalian protein found in Homo sapiens

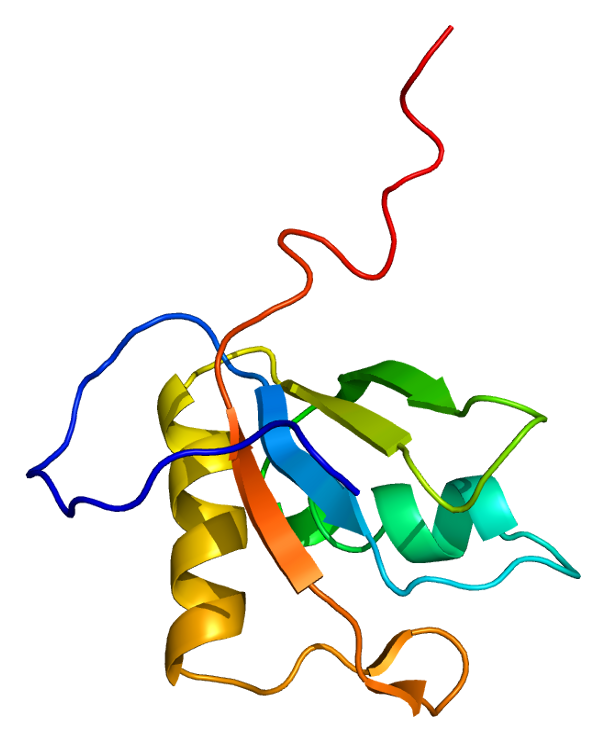

Identifiers
- Aliases: MATR3, ALS21, MPD2, VCPDM, matrin 3
- External IDs: OMIM: 164015; MGI: 1298379; GeneCards: MATR3
Available structures
PDB	Ortholog search: PDBe RCSB
PDB	List of PDB id codes 1X4D, 1X4F
Gene ontology
Molecular function	zinc ion binding; protein binding; structural molecule activity; metal ion binding; nucleic acid binding; RNA binding; identical protein binding; miRNA binding
Cellular component	nuclear matrix; nuclear inner membrane; membrane; nucleus
Biological process	posttranscriptional regulation of gene expression; activation of innate immune response; immune system process; innate immune response; heart valve development; ventricular septum development
Sources:Amigo / QuickGO
Orthologs
Databases	NCBI: entry; OMA: entry
Species	Human	Mouse
Entrez	9782	17184
Ensembl	ENSG00000015479; ENSG00000280987	ENSMUSG00000037236
UniProt	P43243	Q8K310
RefSeq (mRNA)	NM_001194954; NM_001194955; NM_001194956; NM_001282278; NM_018834 NM_199189	NM_010771
RefSeq (protein)	NP_001181883; NP_001181884; NP_001181885; NP_001269207; NP_061322 NP_954659	NP_034901; NP_001386912; NP_001386913; NP_001386914; NP_001386915 NP_001386917; NP_001386918; NP_001386919; NP_001386920; NP_001386921; NP_001386922
Location (UCSC)	n/a	n/a
PubMed search
- Wikidata
View/Edit Human	View/Edit Mouse

Matrin-3 is a protein that in humans is encoded by the MATR3 gene.

== Function ==
The protein encoded by this gene is localized in the nuclear matrix. It may play a role in transcription or may interact with other nuclear matrix proteins to form the internal fibrogranular network. Two transcript variants encoding the same protein have been identified for this gene.

== Pathology ==
Mutations in the Matrin 3 gene are associated with familial amyotrophic lateral sclerosis.
