= Valosin-containing protein =

Protein-coding gene in the species Homo sapiens

VCP/p97
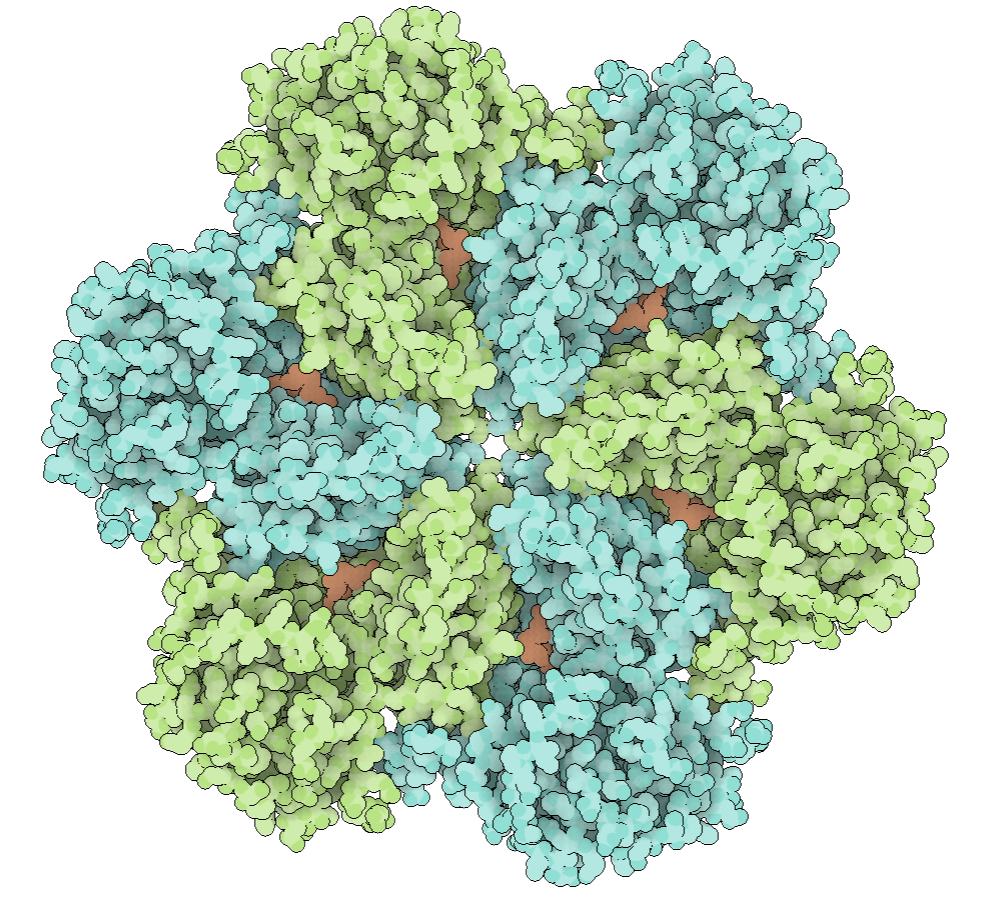

Identifiers
- Aliases: VCP, ALS14, HEL-220, HEL-S-70, IBMPFD, IBMPFD1, TERA, p97, Valosin-containing protein, CMT2Y, valosin containing protein, CDC48, FTDALS6
- External IDs: OMIM: 601023; MGI: 99919; GeneCards: VCP
Available structures
| PDB | Ortholog search: PDBe RCSB |
| PDB | List of PDB id codes 3EBB, 3HU1, 3HU2, 3HU3, 3QC8, 3QQ7, 3QQ8, 3QWZ, 3TIW, 4KDI, 4KDL, 4KLN, 4KO8, 4KOD, 4P0A, 5C19, 3CF2, 3CF1, 5FTK, 5C18, 3CF3, 5FTJ, 5FTM, 5FTL, 5FTN, 5C1B, 5C1A, 5DYI, 5DYG |
Enzyme activity
| EC # | BRENDA | ExPASy | KEGG | MetaCyc |
|---|---|---|---|---|
| 3.6.4.6 | ↗ | ↗ | ↗ | ↗ |

Gene location (Human)
| Chr. | Chromosome 9 (human) |
| Band | 9p13.3 | Start | 35,053,928 bp |
| Band | 9p13.3 | End | 35,072,668 bp |

Gene location (Mouse)
| Chr. | Chromosome 4 (mouse) |
| Band | 4 A5|4 22.95 cM | Start | 42,979,963 bp |
| Band | 4 A5|4 22.95 cM | End | 43,000,507 bp |
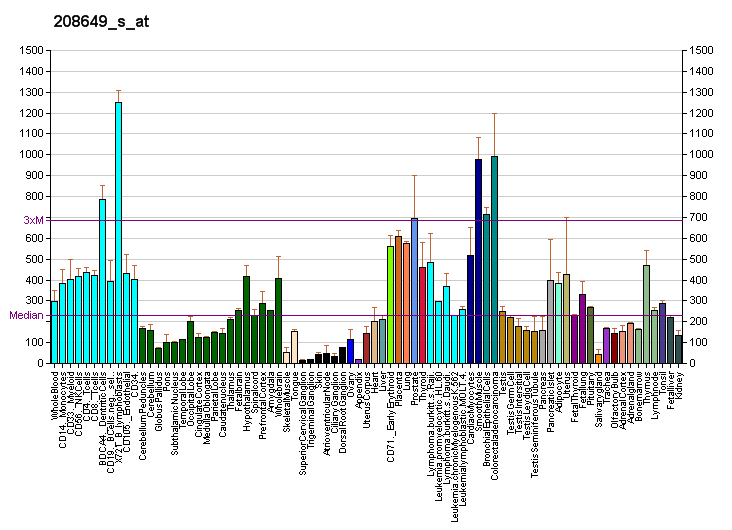

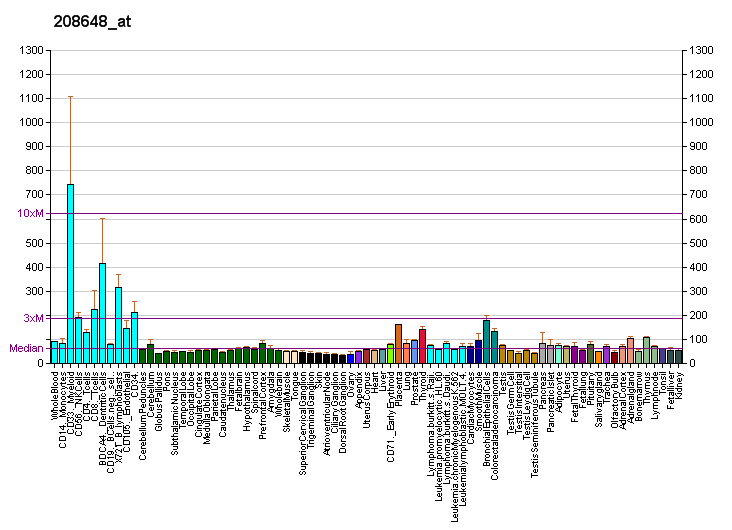
RNA expression pattern
| Bgee | Human / Mouse (ortholog); Top expressed in: stromal cell of endometrium; islet of Langerhans; gastrocnemius muscle; right adrenal gland; right adrenal cortex; left adrenal gland; left adrenal cortex; muscle of thigh; ventricular zone; minor salivary glands / Top expressed in: muscle of thigh; ventricular zone; neural layer of retina; right kidney; lip; yolk sac; tail of embryo; superior frontal gyrus; genital tubercle; granulocyte; More reference expression data |
| BioGPS | More reference expression data |
Gene ontology
| Molecular function | nucleotide binding; protein domain specific binding; protein-containing complex binding; ADP binding; K48-linked polyubiquitin modification-dependent protein binding; polyubiquitin modification-dependent protein binding; protein binding; ubiquitin-like protein ligase binding; ubiquitin-specific protease binding; MHC class I protein binding; protein phosphatase binding; deubiquitinase activator activity; signaling receptor binding; hydrolase activity; ATP binding; ubiquitin protein ligase binding; lipid binding; identical protein binding; ATPase activity; RNA binding; BAT3 complex binding |
| Cellular component | site of double-strand break; cytosol; intracellular membrane-bounded organelle; myelin sheath; lipid droplet; nucleoplasm; VCP-NSFL1C complex; endoplasmic reticulum; Derlin-1 retrotranslocation complex; VCP-NPL4-UFD1 AAA ATPase complex; perinuclear region of cytoplasm; proteasome complex; nucleus; extracellular exosome; extracellular region; secretory granule lumen; azurophil granule lumen; ficolin-1-rich granule lumen; ATPase complex; endoplasmic reticulum membrane; cytoplasm; cytoplasmic stress granule; protein-containing complex; synapse; glutamatergic synapse |
| Biological process | regulation of aerobic respiration; regulation of apoptotic process; positive regulation of protein catabolic process; positive regulation of protein-containing complex assembly; ubiquitin-dependent protein catabolic process; positive regulation of Lys63-specific deubiquitinase activity; establishment of protein localization; error-free translesion synthesis; viral genome replication; positive regulation of oxidative phosphorylation; ER-associated misfolded protein catabolic process; protein N-linked glycosylation via asparagine; cellular response to DNA damage stimulus; positive regulation of ATP biosynthetic process; endoplasmic reticulum to Golgi vesicle-mediated transport; ATP metabolic process; retrograde protein transport, ER to cytosol; NADH metabolic process; positive regulation of protein K63-linked deubiquitination; double-strand break repair; ubiquitin-dependent ERAD pathway; positive regulation of mitochondrial membrane potential; activation of cysteine-type endopeptidase activity involved in apoptotic process; protein homooligomerization; positive regulation of proteasomal ubiquitin-dependent protein catabolic process; protein hexamerization; aggresome assembly; flavin adenine dinucleotide catabolic process; proteasome-mediated ubiquitin-dependent protein catabolic process; autophagy; DNA repair; ERAD pathway; positive regulation of ubiquitin-specific protease activity; autophagosome maturation; translesion synthesis; protein folding; protein methylation; protein deubiquitination; neutrophil degranulation; transmembrane transport; proteasomal protein catabolic process; protein ubiquitination; endoplasmic reticulum unfolded protein response; endoplasmic reticulum stress-induced pre-emptive quality control; macroautophagy; endosome to lysosome transport via multivesicular body sorting pathway; transport; cellular response to heat; stress granule disassembly; regulation of synapse organization; mitotic spindle disassembly; positive regulation of canonical Wnt signaling pathway; cellular response to arsenite ion |
Sources:Amigo / QuickGO
Orthologs
| Databases | NCBI: entry; OMA: entry |
| Species | Human | Mouse |
| Entrez | 7415 | 269523 |
| Ensembl | ENSG00000165280 | ENSMUSG00000028452 |
| UniProt | P55072 | Q01853 |
| RefSeq (mRNA) | NM_007126; NM_001354927; NM_001354928 | NM_009503 |
| RefSeq (protein) | NP_009057; NP_001341856; NP_001341857 | NP_033529 |
| Location (UCSC) | Chr 9: 35.05 – 35.07 Mb | Chr 4: 42.98 – 43 Mb |
| PubMed search |
- Wikidata
| View/Edit Human | View/Edit Mouse |

Valosin-containing protein (VCP), also known as p97 or CDC48, is an enzyme that in humans is encoded by the VCP gene. VCP/p97 is an ATPase enzyme present in all eukaryotes and Archaea. Its main function is to segregate protein molecules from large cellular structures such as protein assemblies, organelle membranes and chromatin, and thus facilitate the degradation of released polypeptides by the multi-subunit protease proteasome.

VCP/p97 is a member of the AAA+ (extended family of ATPases associated with various cellular activities) ATPase family. Enzymes of this family are found in all species from bacteria to humans. Many of them are important chaperones that regulate folding or unfolding of substrate proteins. VCP is a type II AAA+ ATPase, which means that it contains two tandem ATPase domains (named D1 and D2, respectively) (Figure 1).

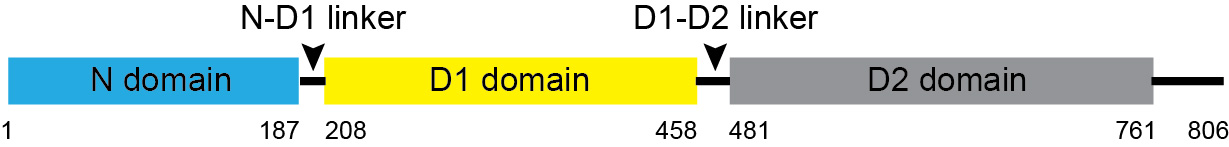
Figure 1- A schematic diagram of the p97 domain structure.

The two ATPase domains are connected by a short polypeptide linker. A domain preceding the D1 domain (N-terminal domain) and a short carboxyl-terminal tail are involved in interaction with cofactors. The N-domain is connected to the D1 domain by a short N-D1 linker.

Most known substrates of VCP are modified with ubiquitin chains and degraded by the 26S proteasome. Accordingly, many VCP coenzymes and adaptors have domains that can recognize ubiquitin. It has become evident that the interplays between ubiquitin and VCP cofactors are critical for many of the proposed functions, although the precise role of these interactions remains to be elucidated.

== Discovery ==
VCP/p97 was first discovered in a genetic screen for genes involved in cell cycle regulation in budding yeast. The screen identified several alleles of Cdc48 that affect cell growth at non-permissive temperatures. A search for the mammalian homolog of CDC48 (valosin) revealed a 97 kDa protein precursor named "valosin-containing protein (VCP)" or p97, and also showed that it was only generated as an artefact of purification rather than during physiological processing. Even without evidence that valosin is a physiological product, the VCP nomenclature continues to be used in the literature.

== Tissue and subcelluar distribution ==
VCP is one of the most abundant cytoplasmic proteins in eukaryotic cells. It is ubiquitously expressed in all tissues in multicellular organisms. In humans, the mRNA expression of VCP was found to be moderately elevated in certain types of cancer.

In mammalian cells, VCP is predominantly localized to the cytoplasm, and a significant fraction is associated to membranes of cellular organelles such as the endoplasmic reticulum (ER), Golgi, mitochondria, and endosomes. The subcellular localization of CDC48 has not been fully characterized, but is likely to be similar to the mammalian counterpart. A fraction of VCP was also found in the nucleus.

== Structure ==
According to the crystal structures of full-length wild-type VCP, six VCP subunits assemble into a barrel-like structure, in which the N-D1 and D2 domains form two concentric, stacked rings (Figure 2).

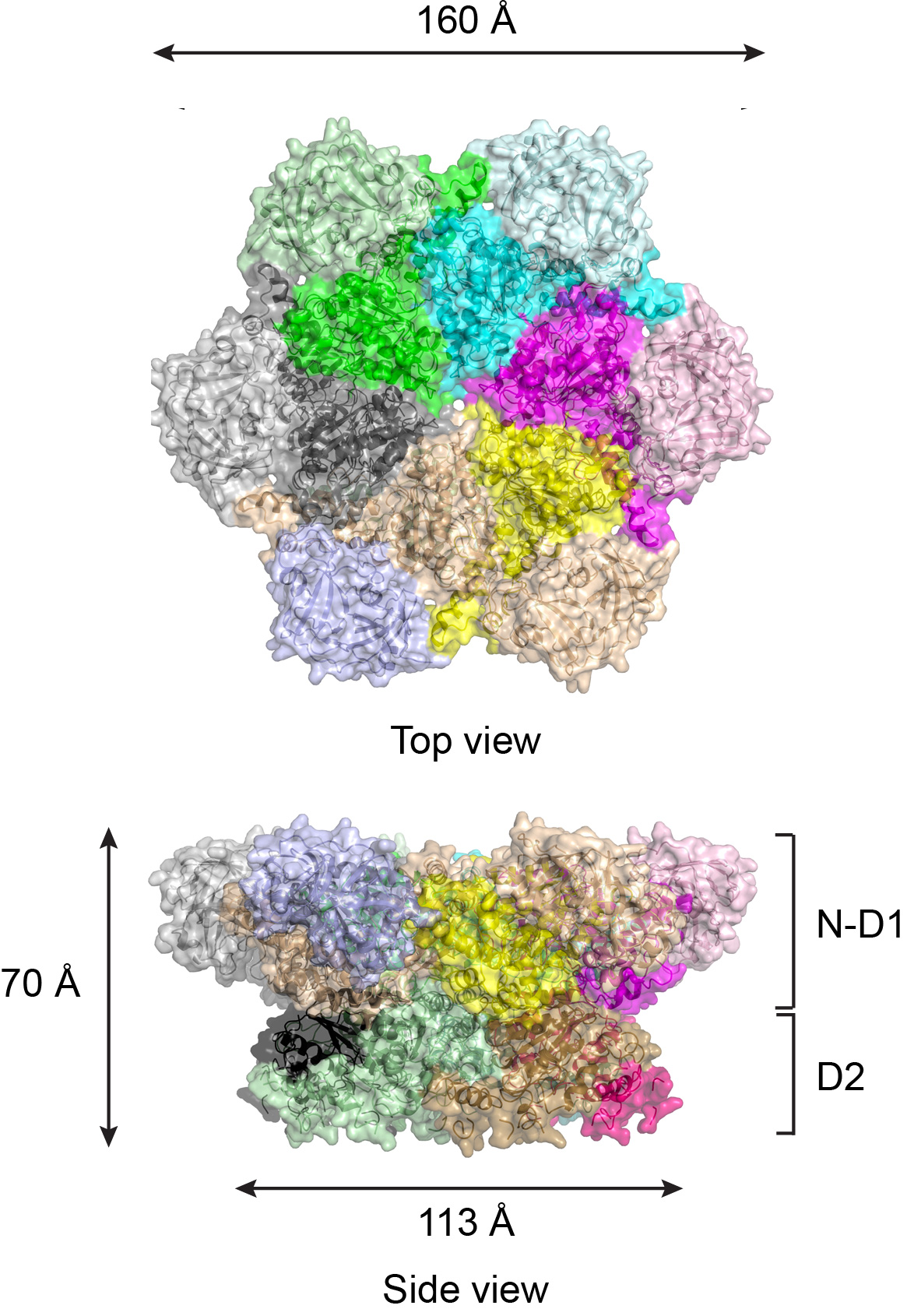
Figure 2- The structure of VCP. The six subunits are shown as molecular surface in different colors. Domains of each subunit are also shaded differently. Two views are presented. This structure represents VCP in an ADP bound state.

The N-D1 ring is larger (162 Å in diameter) than the D2 ring (113 Å) due to the laterally attached N-domains. The D1 and D2 domains are highly homologous in both sequence and structure, but they serve distinct functions. For example, the hexameric assembly of VCP only requires the D1 but not the D2 domain. Unlike many bacterial AAA+ proteins, assembly of VCP hexamer does not depend on the presence of nucleotide. The VCP hexameric assembly can undergo dramatic conformational changes during nucleotide hydrolysis cycle, and it is generally believed that these conformational changes generate mechanical force, which is applied to substrate molecules to influence their stability and function. However, how precisely VCP generates force is unclear.

== The ATP hydrolysis cycle ==
The ATP hydrolyzing activity is indispensable for the VCP functions. The two ATPase domains of VCP (D1 and D2) are not equivalent because the D2 domain displays higher ATPase activity than the D1 domain in wild-type protein. Nevertheless, their activities are dependent of each other. For example, nucleotide binding to the D1 domain is required for ATP binding to the D2 domain and nucleotide binding and hydrolysis in D2 is required for the D1 domain to hydrolyze ATP.

The ATPase activity of VCP can be influenced by many factors. For example, it can be stimulated by heat or by a putative substrate protein. In Leishmania infantum, the LiVCP protein is essential for the intracellular development of the parasite and its survival under heat stress. Association with cofactors can have either positive or negative impact on the p97 ATPase activity.

Mutations in VCP can also influence its activity. For example, VCP mutant proteins carrying single point mutations found in patients with multisystem proteinopathy (MSP; formerly known as IBMPFD (inclusion body myopathy associated with Paget disease of the bone and frontotemporal dementia)) (see below) have 2-3 fold increase in ATPase activity.

== VCP-interacting proteins ==
Recent proteomic studies have identified a large number of p97-interacting proteins. Many of these proteins serve as adaptors that link VCP to a particular subcellular compartment to function in a specific cellular pathway. Others function as adaptors that recruit substrates to VCP for processing. Some VCP-interacting proteins are also enzymes such as N-glycanase, ubiquitin ligase, and deubiquitinase, which assist VCP in processing substrates.

Most cofactors bind VCP through its N-domain, but a few interact with the short carboxy-terminal tail in VCP. Representative proteins interacting with the N-domain are Ufd1, Npl4, p47 and FAF1. Examples of cofactors that interact with the carboxy-terminal tail of VCP are PLAA, PNGase, and Ufd2.

The molecular basis for cofactor binding has been studied for some cofactors that interact with the VCP N-domain. The N-domain consists of two sub-domains of roughly equal size: the N-terminal double Y-barrel and a C-terminal b-barrel (Figure 3).

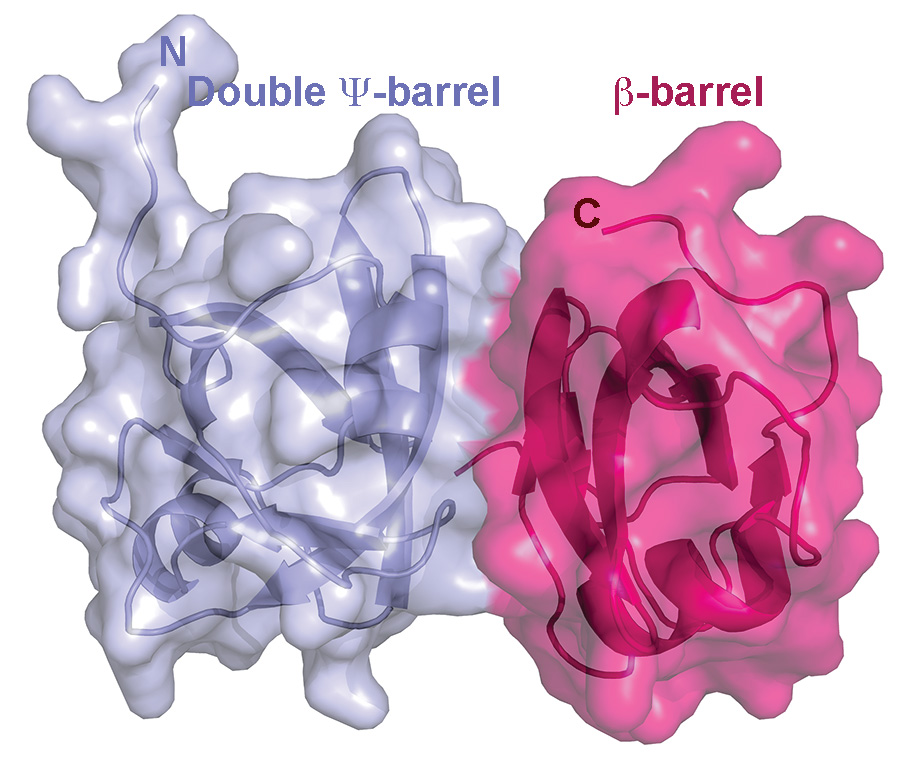
Figure 3- Structure of the N-domain of VCP. The N-domain is depicted as a molecular surface superimposed to a ribbon representation.

Structural studies show that many cofactor proteins bind to the N-domain at a cleft formed between the two sub-domains.

Among those that bind to the N-domain of VCP, two most frequently occurring sequence motifs are found: one is called UBX motif (ubiquitin regulatory X) and the other is termed VIM (VCP-interacting motif). The UBX domain is an 80-residue module with a fold highly resembling the structure of ubiquitin. The VCP-interacting motif (VIM) is a linear sequence motif (RX_{5}AAX_{2}R) found in a number of VCP cofactors including gp78, SVIP (small VCP-interacting protein) and VIMP (VCP interacting membrane protein). Although the UBX domain uses a surface loop whereas the VIM forms a-helix to bind VCP, both UBX and VIM bind at the same location between the two sub-domains of the N-domain (Figure 3). It was proposed that hierarchical binding to distinct cofactors may be essential for the broad functions of VCP.

== Function ==
VCP performs diverse functions through modulating the stability and thus the activity of its substrates. The general function of VCP is to segregate proteins from large protein assembly or immobile cellular structures such as membranes or chromatin, allowing the released protein molecules to be degraded by the proteasome. The functions of VCP can be grouped into the following three major categories.

=== Protein quality control ===
The best characterized function of VCP is to mediate a network of protein quality control processes in order to maintain protein homeostasis. These include endoplasmic reticulum-associated protein degradation (ERAD) and mitochondria-associated degradation. In these processes, ATP hydrolysis by VCP is required to extract aberrant proteins from the membranes of the ER or mitochondria. VCP is also required to release defective translation products stalled on ribosome in a process termed ribosome-associated degradation. It appears that only after extraction from the membranes or large protein assembly like ribosome, can polypeptides be degraded by the proteasome. In addition to this 'segregase' function, VCP might have an additional role in shuttling the released polypeptides to the proteasome. This chaperoning function seems to be particularly important for degradation of certain aggregation-prone misfolded proteins in nucleus. Several lines of evidence also implicate p97 in autophagy, a process that turns over cellular proteins (including misfolded ones) by engulfing them into double-membrane-surrounded vesicles named autophagosome, but the precise role of VCP in this process is unclear.

=== Chromatin-associated functions ===
VCP also functions broadly in eukaryotic nucleus by releasing protein molecules from chromatins in a manner analogous to that in ERAD. The identified VCP substrates include transcriptional repressor α2 and RNA polymerase (Pol) II complex and CMG DNA helicase in budding yeast, and the DNA replicating licensing factor CDT1, DNA repairing proteins DDB2 and XPC, mitosis regulator Aurora B, and certain DNA polymerases in mammalian cells. These substrates link VCP function to gene transcription, DNA replication and repair, and cell cycle progression.

=== Membrane fusion and trafficking ===
Biochemical and genetic studies have also implicated VCP in fusion of vesicles that lead to the formation of Golgi apparatus at the end of mitosis. This process requires the ubiquitin binding adaptor p47 and a p97-associated deubiquitinase VCIP135, and thus connecting membrane fusion to the ubiquitin pathways. However, the precise role of VCP in Golgi formation is unclear due to lack of information on relevant substrate(s). Recent studies also suggest that VCP may regulate vesicle trafficking from plasma membrane to the lysosome, a process termed endocytosis. Antibody fragment-based inhibitors have been developed by a team led by Arkin to inhibit the interaction between p97 and p47, selectively modulating the Golgi reassembly process.

== Clinical significance ==
=== Links to human diseases ===
Mutations in VCP were first reported to cause a syndrome characterized by frontotemporal dementia, inclusion body myopathy, and Paget's disease of the bone by Virginia Kimonis in 2004. In 2010, mutations in VCP were also found to be a cause of amyotrophic lateral sclerosis by Bryan Traynor and Adriano Chiò. This discovery was notable as it represented an initial genetic link between two disparate neurological diseases, amyotrophic lateral sclerosis and frontotemporal dementia. In 2020, Edward Lee described a distinct hypomorphic mutation in VCP associated with vacuolar tauopathy, a unique subtype of frontotemporal lobar degeneration with tau inclusions.

Mutations in VCP are an example of pleiotropy, where mutations in the same gene give rise to different phenotypes. The term multisystem proteinopathy (MSP) has been coined to describe this particular form of pleiotropy. Although MSP is rare, growing interest in this syndrome derives from the molecular insights the condition provides into the etiological relationship between common age-related degenerative diseases of muscle, bone and brain. It has been estimated that ~50% of MSP may be caused by missense mutations affecting the valosin-containing protein (VCP) gene.

=== Cancer therapy ===
The first p97 inhibitor Eeyarestatin (EerI) was discovered by screening and characterizing compounds that inhibit the degradation of a fluorescence-labeled ERAD substrate. The mechanism of VCP inhibition by EerI is unclear, but when applied to cells, it induces biological phenotypes associated with VCP inhibition such as ERAD inhibition, ER stress elevation, and apoptosis induction. Importantly, EerI displays significant cancer-killing activity in vitro preferentially against cancer cells isolated from patients, and it can synergize with the proteasome inhibitor bortezomib to kill cancer cells. These observations prompt the idea of targeting VCP as a potential cancer therapy. This idea was further confirmed by studying several ATP competitive and allosteric inhibitors. More recently, a potent and specific VCP inhibitor CB-5083 has been developed, which demonstrates promising anti-cancer activities in mouse xenograft tumor models. The compound is now being evaluated in a phase 1 clinical trial.

== Conferences ==
Since the mid-2010s, a series of international meetings have been held to coordinate research and clinical understanding of disorders caused by VCP gene variants. The first expert workshop, convened by the European Neuromuscular Centre (ENMC) in 2015, established a shared clinical framework and research priorities for what were then termed VCP-related multisystem proteinopathies. Subsequent conferences in 2021 and 2024 brought together academic researchers, clinicians, and patient-advocacy groups to review advances in molecular mechanisms, diagnostic approaches, and therapeutic development. These meetings have contributed to the formation of ongoing international collaborations and patient registries dedicated to VCP-associated diseases.
