= HNRNPA2B1 =

Protein-coding gene in the species Homo sapiens

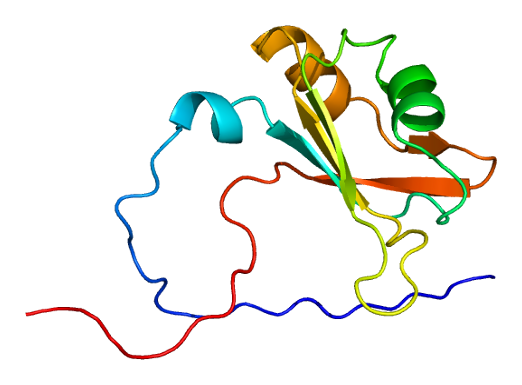

Identifiers
- Aliases: HNRNPA2B1, HNRNPA2, HNRNPB1, HNRPA2, HNRPA2B1, HNRPB1, IBMPFD2, RNPA2, SNRPB1, heterogeneous nuclear ribonucleoprotein A2/B1
- External IDs: OMIM: 600124; MGI: 104819; GeneCards: HNRNPA2B1
Available structures
PDB	Ortholog search: PDBe RCSB
PDB	List of PDB id codes 1X4B

Gene location (Human)
Chr.	Chromosome 7 (human)
Band	7p15.2	Start	26,171,151 bp
Band	7p15.2	End	26,201,529 bp

Gene location (Mouse)
Chr.	Chromosome 6 (mouse)
Band	6|6 B3	Start	51,460,932 bp
Band	6|6 B3	End	51,469,894 bp
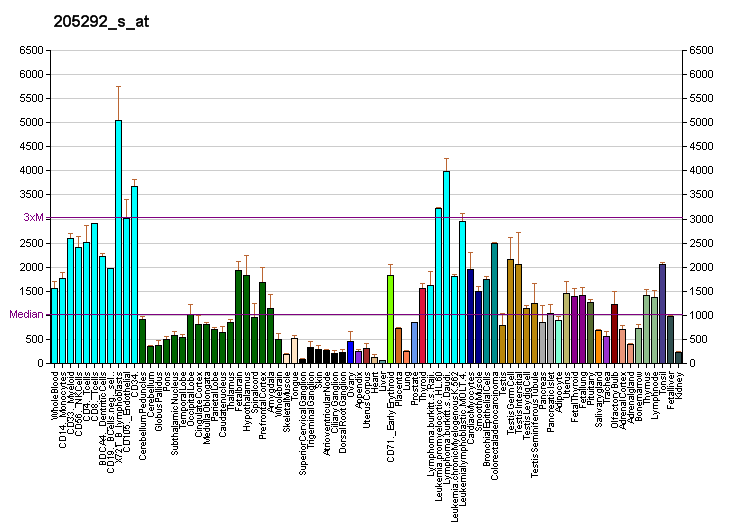
RNA expression pattern
Bgee	Human / Mouse (ortholog); Top expressed in: epithelium of nasopharynx; tendon of biceps brachii; ventricular zone; internal globus pallidus; ganglionic eminence; mucosa of paranasal sinus; endometrium; pylorus; right testis; cardia / Top expressed in: ventricular zone; tail of embryo; primitive streak; Gonadal ridge; abdominal wall; maxillary prominence; ganglionic eminence; mandibular prominence; neural layer of retina; saccule; More reference expression data
BioGPS	More reference expression data
Gene ontology
Molecular function	N6-methyladenosine-containing RNA binding; pre-mRNA intronic binding; miRNA binding; single-stranded telomeric DNA binding; mRNA 3'-UTR binding; protein binding; nucleic acid binding; RNA binding; G-rich strand telomeric DNA binding; identical protein binding; mRNA binding
Cellular component	cytoplasm; catalytic step 2 spliceosome; membrane; extracellular region; spliceosomal complex; nucleus; nucleoplasm; telomere; Cajal body; nuclear matrix; extracellular exosome; ribonucleoprotein complex
Biological process	mRNA splicing, via spliceosome; mRNA transport; miRNA transport; RNA transport; mRNA processing; negative regulation of transcription by RNA polymerase II; negative regulation of mRNA splicing, via spliceosome; primary miRNA processing; RNA splicing; G-quadruplex DNA unwinding; positive regulation of telomere maintenance via telomere lengthening; positive regulation of telomerase RNA reverse transcriptase activity; mRNA export from nucleus; RNA metabolic process; interleukin-12-mediated signaling pathway; transport
Sources:Amigo / QuickGO
Orthologs
Databases	NCBI: entry; OMA: entry
Species	Human	Mouse
Entrez	3181	53379
Ensembl	ENSG00000122566	ENSMUSG00000004980
UniProt	P22626	O88569
RefSeq (mRNA)	NM_002137; NM_031243	NM_016806; NM_182650
RefSeq (protein)	NP_002128; NP_112533	NP_058086; NP_872591; NP_001361674
Location (UCSC)	Chr 7: 26.17 – 26.2 Mb	Chr 6: 51.46 – 51.47 Mb
PubMed search
- Wikidata
View/Edit Human	View/Edit Mouse

Heterogeneous nuclear ribonucleoproteins A2/B1 is a protein that in humans is encoded by the HNRNPA2B1 gene.

== Structure ==
HNRNPA2B1 gene contains 12 exons, including a B1 protein specific 36-nucleotide mini-exon. The entire length of intron/exon organization of HNRNPA2B1 is identical to that of the HNRNPA1 gene which indicates a common origin by gene duplication.

== Function ==
This gene belongs to the A/B subfamily of ubiquitously expressed heterogeneous nuclear ribonucleoproteins (hnRNPs). The hnRNPs are RNA binding proteins and they complex with heterogeneous nuclear RNA (hnRNA). These proteins are associated with pre-mRNAs in the nucleus and appear to influence pre-mRNA processing and other aspects of mRNA metabolism and transport. While all of the hnRNPs are present in the nucleus, some seem to shuttle between the nucleus and the cytoplasm. The hnRNP proteins have distinct nucleic acid binding properties. The protein encoded by this gene has two repeats of quasi-RRM domains that bind to RNAs. This gene has been described to generate two alternatively spliced transcript variants which encode different isoforms. HnRNPA2B1 is an autoantigen in autoimmune diseases such as rheumatoid arthritis, systemic lupus erythematosus and mixed connective tissue disease. When referred to as an autoantigen, hnRNPA2B1 is also known as RA33.

The HNRNPA2 and HNRNPB1 proteins are involved in packaging nascent mRNA, in alternative splicing, and in cytoplasmic RNA trafficking, translation, and stabilization. HNRNPA2 and HNRNPB1 also appear to function in telomere maintenance, cell proliferation and differentiation, and glucose transport.

Function of HNRNPA2B1 gene can be effectively examined by siRNA knockdown based on an independent validation.

== Interactions ==
HNRPA2B1 has been shown to interact with casein kinase 2, alpha 1.

== Role in diseases ==
The mutation p.D290V/302V in hnRNPA2B1 is implicated in dementia, myopathy, Paget's disease of bone, and ALS. Mutations in hnRNPA2B1 and hnRNPA1 cause of amyotrophic lateral sclerosis and multisystem proteinopathy. hnRNPA2/B1 is found to activate cyclooxygenase-2 and promote tumor growth in human lung cancers.
