= CCP110 =

Protein found in humans

Identifiers
- Aliases: CCP110, CP110, Cep110, centriolar coiled-coil protein 110kDa, centriolar coiled-coil protein 110
- External IDs: OMIM: 609544; MGI: 2141942; GeneCards: CCP110

Gene location (Human)
Chr.	Chromosome 16 (human)
Band	16p12.3	Start	19,523,811 bp
Band	16p12.3	End	19,553,408 bp

Gene location (Mouse)
Chr.	Chromosome 7 (mouse)
Band	7|7 F2	Start	118,311,775 bp
Band	7|7 F2	End	118,336,247 bp
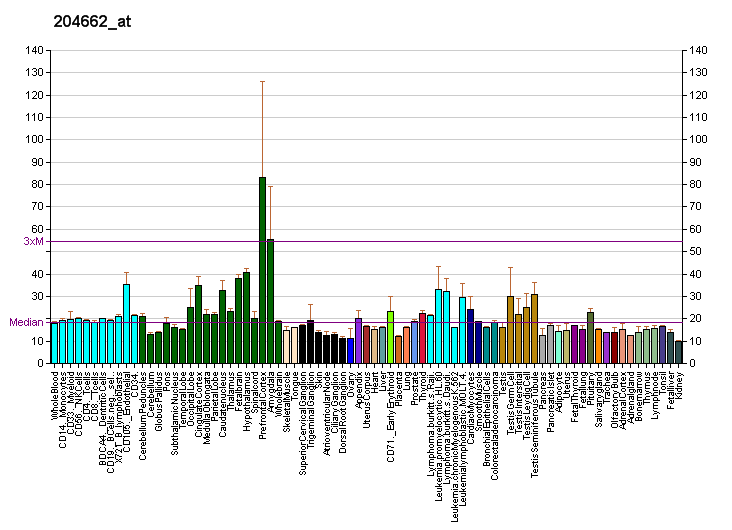
RNA expression pattern
Bgee	Human / Mouse (ortholog); Top expressed in: optic nerve; corpus callosum; globus pallidus; internal globus pallidus; external globus pallidus; buccal mucosa cell; bronchial epithelial cell; inferior ganglion of vagus nerve; pars reticulata; subthalamic nucleus / Top expressed in: superior cervical ganglion; olfactory epithelium; zygote; hand; spermatocyte; seminiferous tubule; secondary oocyte; lateral geniculate nucleus; globus pallidus; tail of embryo; More reference expression data
BioGPS	More reference expression data
Gene ontology
Molecular function	protein binding
Cellular component	cell projection; cytosol; centriole; cytoplasm; centrosome; cilium; microtubule organizing center; cytoskeleton; protein-containing complex
Biological process	cell projection organization; G2/M transition of mitotic cell cycle; negative regulation of cilium assembly; centriole replication; positive regulation of cilium assembly; ciliary basal body organization; centrosome duplication; regulation of cytokinesis; protein deubiquitination; ciliary basal body-plasma membrane docking; regulation of G2/M transition of mitotic cell cycle
Sources:Amigo / QuickGO
Orthologs
Databases	NCBI: entry; OMA: entry
Species	Human	Mouse
Entrez	9738	101565
Ensembl	ENSG00000103540	ENSMUSG00000033904
UniProt	O43303	Q7TSH4
RefSeq (mRNA)	NM_001199022; NM_014711; NM_001323569; NM_001323570; NM_001323571 NM_001323572; NM_001323576; NM_001323577	NM_182995; NM_001360793; NM_001360794
RefSeq (protein)	NP_001185951; NP_001310498; NP_001310499; NP_001310500; NP_001310501 NP_001310505; NP_001310506; NP_055526	NP_892040; NP_001347722; NP_001347723
Location (UCSC)	Chr 16: 19.52 – 19.55 Mb	Chr 7: 118.31 – 118.34 Mb
PubMed search
- Wikidata
View/Edit Human	View/Edit Mouse

Centriolar coiled-coil protein of 110 kDa also known as centrosomal protein of 110 kDa or CP110 is a protein that in humans is encoded by the CCP110 gene. It is a cell cycle-dependent CDK substrate and regulates centrosome duplication. CP110 suppresses a cilia assembly program.
