= Optineurin =

Protein found in humans

OPTN

Identifiers
- Aliases: OPTN, ALS12, FIP2, GLC1E, HIP7, HYPL, NRP, TFIIIA-INTP, optineurin
- External IDs: OMIM: 602432; MGI: 1918898; GeneCards: OPTN
Available structures
PDB	Ortholog search: PDBe RCSB
PDB	List of PDB id codes 2LO4, 2LUE, 5AAZ

Gene location (Human)
Chr.	Chromosome 10 (human)
Band	10p13	Start	13,099,449 bp
Band	10p13	End	13,138,308 bp

Gene location (Mouse)
Chr.	Chromosome 2 (mouse)
Band	2 A1|2 3.15 cM	Start	5,025,453 bp
Band	2 A1|2 3.15 cM	End	5,068,862 bp
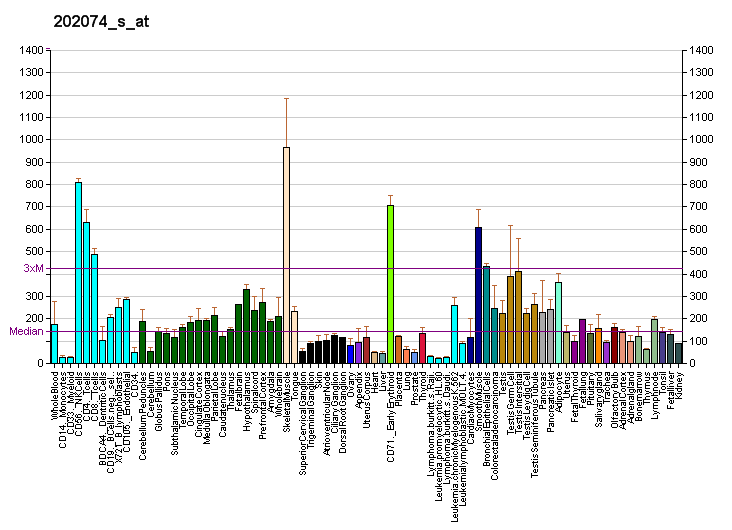

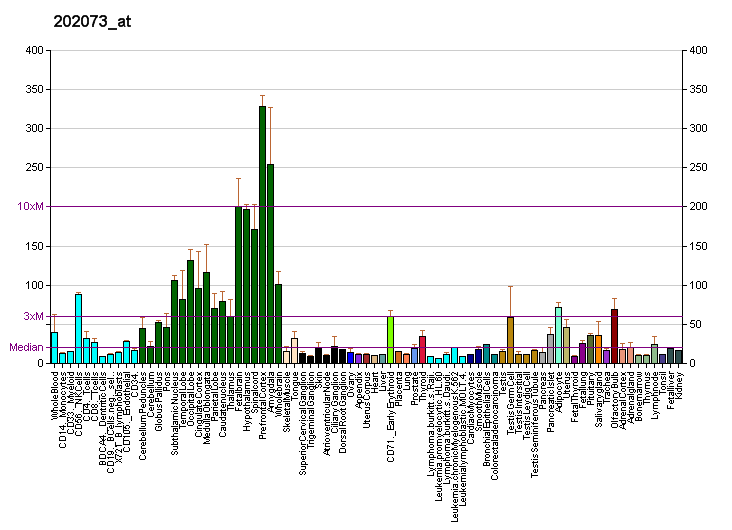
RNA expression pattern
Bgee	Human / Mouse (ortholog); Top expressed in: amniotic fluid; gastrocnemius muscle; muscle of thigh; glutes; triceps brachii muscle; vastus lateralis muscle; Skeletal muscle tissue of biceps brachii; tendon; tendon of biceps brachii; thoracic diaphragm / Top expressed in: neural layer of retina; muscle of thigh; jejunum; iris; retinal pigment epithelium; spermatid; myocardium of ventricle; seminiferous tubule; interventricular septum; knee joint; More reference expression data
BioGPS	More reference expression data
Gene ontology
Molecular function	protein-macromolecule adaptor activity; protein C-terminus binding; protein binding; identical protein binding; K63-linked polyubiquitin modification-dependent protein binding; metal ion binding; polyubiquitin modification-dependent protein binding
Cellular component	recycling endosome; endosome; Golgi membrane; nucleoplasm; autophagosome; trans-Golgi network; perinuclear region of cytoplasm; nucleus; Golgi apparatus; cytoplasm; cytosol; recycling endosome membrane; cytoplasmic vesicle
Biological process	Golgi organization; cell death; negative regulation of I-kappaB kinase/NF-kappaB signaling; autophagy; G2/M transition of mitotic cell cycle; defense response to Gram-negative bacterium; negative regulation of receptor recycling; vesicle-mediated transport; regulation of I-kappaB kinase/NF-kappaB signaling; signal transduction; Golgi to plasma membrane protein transport; parkin-mediated stimulation of mitophagy in response to mitochondrial depolarization; positive regulation of xenophagy; positive regulation of autophagy; Unfolded protein response; Golgi ribbon formation; immune system process; innate immune response; protein localization to Golgi apparatus
Sources:Amigo / QuickGO
Orthologs
Databases	NCBI: entry; OMA: entry
Species	Human	Mouse
Entrez	10133	71648
Ensembl	ENSG00000123240	ENSMUSG00000026672
UniProt	Q96CV9	Q8K3K8
RefSeq (mRNA)	NM_001008211; NM_001008212; NM_001008213; NM_021980	NM_181848; NM_001356487
RefSeq (protein)	NP_001008212; NP_001008213; NP_001008214; NP_068815	NP_862896; NP_001343416
Location (UCSC)	Chr 10: 13.1 – 13.14 Mb	Chr 2: 5.03 – 5.07 Mb
PubMed search
- Wikidata
View/Edit Human	View/Edit Mouse

Optineurin is a protein that in humans is encoded by the OPTN gene.

== Structure ==
This gene encodes the coiled-coil containing protein optineurin. Alternative splicing results in multiple transcript variants encoding the same protein.

== Function ==
Optineurin may function in cellular morphogenesis and membrane trafficking, vesicle trafficking, and transcription activation through its interactions with the RAB8, huntingtin, and transcription factor IIIA proteins. OPTN is a host intrinsic restriction factor against neuroinvasive HSV-1 infection.

== Clinical significance ==
Optineurin may play a role in normal-tension glaucoma and adult-onset primary open angle glaucoma. Optineurin interacts with adenovirus E3-14.7K protein and may utilize tumor necrosis factor-alpha or Fas-ligand pathways to mediate apoptosis, inflammation or vasoconstriction.

== Interactions ==
Optineurin has been shown to interact with Huntingtin and RAB8A.
