= HNRNPA1 =

Protein-coding gene in the species Homo sapiens

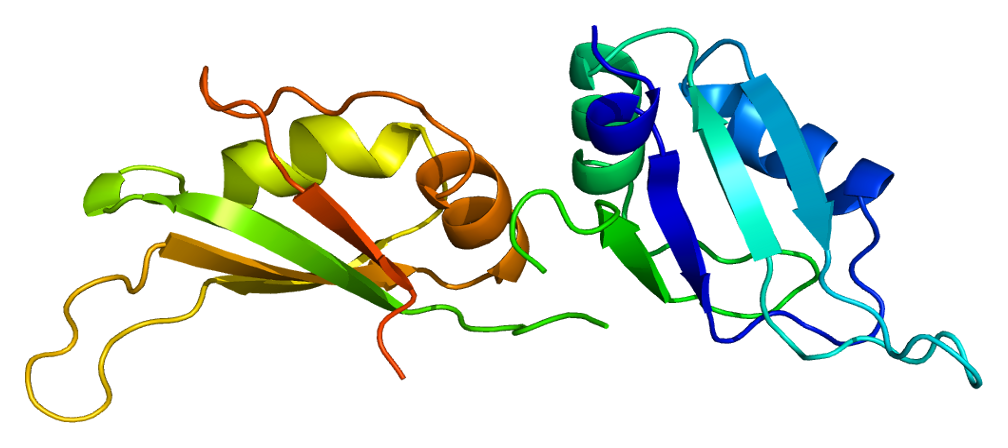

Identifiers
- Aliases: HNRNPA1, ALS19, ALS20, HNRPA1, HNRPA1L3, IBMPFD3, hnRNP A1, hnRNP-A1, UP 1, heterogeneous nuclear ribonucleoprotein A1
- External IDs: OMIM: 164017; MGI: 104820; GeneCards: HNRNPA1
Available structures
PDB	Ortholog search: PDBe RCSB
PDB	List of PDB id codes 1HA1, 1L3K, 1PGZ, 1PO6, 1U1K, 1U1L, 1U1M, 1U1N, 1U1O, 1U1P, 1U1Q, 1U1R, 1UP1, 2H4M, 2LYV, 2UP1, 4YOE

Gene location (Human)
Chr.	Chromosome 12 (human)
Band	12q13.13	Start	54,280,193 bp
Band	12q13.13	End	54,287,088 bp

Gene location (Mouse)
Chr.	Chromosome 15 (mouse)
Band	15 F3|15 58.58 cM	Start	103,148,859 bp
Band	15 F3|15 58.58 cM	End	103,155,119 bp
RNA expression pattern
Bgee	Human / Mouse (ortholog); Top expressed in: ganglionic eminence; ventricular zone; parietal pleura; germinal epithelium; visceral pleura; tibia; caput epididymis; epithelium of colon; cartilage tissue; optic nerve / Top expressed in: ventricular zone; tail of embryo; genital tubercle; neural layer of retina; embryo; yolk sac; embryo; medullary collecting duct; blastocyst; morula; More reference expression data
BioGPS	n/a
Gene ontology
Molecular function	telomeric repeat-containing RNA binding; single-stranded DNA binding; protein binding; single-stranded RNA binding; G-rich strand telomeric DNA binding; nucleic acid binding; RNA binding; protein domain specific binding; pre-mRNA binding; miRNA binding; identical protein binding; mRNA binding
Cellular component	cytoplasm; catalytic step 2 spliceosome; membrane; nucleoplasm; spliceosomal complex; extracellular exosome; nucleus; ribonucleoprotein complex
Biological process	mRNA splicing, via spliceosome; mRNA transport; negative regulation of telomere maintenance via telomerase; RNA export from nucleus; mRNA processing; positive regulation of telomere maintenance via telomerase; nuclear export; viral process; import into nucleus; RNA splicing; fibroblast growth factor receptor signaling pathway; cellular response to sodium arsenite; regulation of alternative mRNA splicing, via spliceosome; RNA metabolic process; cellular response to glucose starvation; transport
Sources:Amigo / QuickGO
Orthologs
Databases	NCBI: entry; OMA: entry
Species	Human	Mouse
Entrez	3178	15382
Ensembl	ENSG00000135486	ENSMUSG00000046434
UniProt	P09651	P49312
RefSeq (mRNA)	NM_002136; NM_031157	NM_001039129; NM_010447
RefSeq (protein)	NP_002127; NP_112420	NP_001034218; NP_034577
Location (UCSC)	Chr 12: 54.28 – 54.29 Mb	Chr 15: 103.15 – 103.16 Mb
PubMed search
- Wikidata
View/Edit Human	View/Edit Mouse

Heterogeneous nuclear ribonucleoprotein A1 is a protein that in humans is encoded by the HNRNPA1 gene. Mutations in hnRNP A1 are causative of amyotrophic lateral sclerosis and the syndrome multisystem proteinopathy.

== Function ==
This gene belongs to the A/B subfamily of ubiquitously expressed heterogeneous nuclear ribonucleoproteins (hnRNPs). The hnRNPs are RNA binding proteins and they complex with heterogeneous nuclear RNA (hnRNA). These proteins are associated with pre-mRNAs in the nucleus and appear to influence pre-mRNA processing and other aspects of mRNA metabolism and transport. While all of the hnRNPs are present in the nucleus, some seem to shuttle between the nucleus and the cytoplasm. The hnRNP proteins have distinct nucleic acid binding properties. The protein encoded by this gene has two repeats of quasi-RRM domains that bind to RNAs in the N-terminal domain which are pivotal for RNA specificity and binding. The protein also has a glycine rich arginine-glycine-glycine (RGG) region called the RGG box which enables protein and RNA binding. It affects many critical genes that are responsible for controlling metabolic pathways at the transcriptional, post-transcriptional, translation, and post-translation levels. It is one of the most abundant core proteins of hnRNP complexes and it is localized to the nucleoplasm. This protein, along with other hnRNP proteins, is exported from the nucleus, probably bound to mRNA, and is immediately re-imported. Its M9 nuclear localisation sequence (NLS), a glycine rich region downstream from the RGG box, acts as both a nuclear localization and nuclear export signal. The encoded protein is involved in the packaging of pre-mRNA into hnRNP particles, transport of poly A+ mRNA from the nucleus to the cytoplasm, and may modulate splice site selection. Multiple alternatively spliced transcript variants have been found for this gene but only two transcripts are fully described. These variants have multiple alternative transcription initiation sites and multiple polyA sites.

Post translational modifications are also known to affect hnRNP A1's function. Methylation of arginine residues in the RGG box may regulate RNA-binding activity. Kinases such as protein kinase C (PKC), mitogen-activated protein kinases (MAPKs), and ribosomal S6 kinases (S6Ks) phosphorylate serine residues at both the N and C terminals to regulate function. Phosphorylation of the C-terminal region causes cytoplasmic accumulation of the protein. However, addition of O-GlcNAcylation (GlcNAc) moiety to serine or threonine is a common and reversible modification that impairs the protein's binding of karyopherin beta (Transportin-1) resulting in nuclear localization of hnRNPA1.

== Interactions ==
hnRNP A1 has been shown to interact with BAT2, Flap structure-specific endonuclease 1 and IκBα.

== Role in Viruses ==
hnRNP A1 is involved in the life cycle of DNA, positive sense RNA, and negative sense RNA viruses are multiple stages post-infection. The proteins role in viral life cycles varies depending on the virus and can even play contradictory roles. In some, it promotes viral replication while in others, it abrogates it.

hnRNP A1's anti-viral effect is present in human T-cell lymphotropic virus type I (HTLV-1) cell culture model. hnRNP A1 inhibits the binding of Rex protein to its response element in 3' long terminal repeat (LTR) of all viral RNAs. Ectopic expression of hnRNP A1 antagonizes post-transcriptional activity of Rex via competitive binding, eliciting an antiviral response against HTLV-1 infection by negatively affecting the rate of viral replication. In the case of Hepatitis C virus (HCV), a positive sense RNA virus, hnRNP A1 interacts with a crucial region near the 3' end of the virus' open reading frame (ORF) called the cis-acting replication element. When hnRNP A1 is upregulated, HCV replication decreases and when hnRNPA1 is downregulated, HCV replication increases.

hnRNP A1's pro-viral effect is present in the Sindbis virus (a positive sense RNA virus) infection model. hnRNP A1 has been found redistributed in the cytoplasmic site of viral replication bound to the 5' UTR region of the viral RNA, promoting synthesis of negative-strand RNA. hnRNP A1 has a similar role in porcine epidemic diarrhea virus (PEDV) infection in which hnRNP A1 co-immunoprecipitates with PEDV nucleocapsid protein during infection. hnRNP A1 also bound to terminal leader sequences and intergenic sequences that are crucial for efficient viral replication. Similar trends have also been observed in rhinovirus (HRV), enterovirus 71 (EV-71), and avian reovirus (ARV) infections.

In the case of some viruses, such as human immunodeficiency virus 1 (HIV-1), contradictory results have been reported in different research studies. Monette et al. reported increased endogenous expression of hnRNP A1 after HIV-1 infection, as enhanced hnRNPA1 levels were seen as favorable for the virus. They also found that down regulation of hnRNPA1 negatively affected viral replication. In contrast, Zahler et al. found that over expression of hnRNP A1 in vitro adversely affected viral replication. As a result, the role of hnRNPA1 in HIV-1's life cycle is somewhat controversial.

== Role in other disease ==
Mutations in hnRNP A1 are a cause of amyotrophic lateral sclerosis and multisystem proteinopathy.

hnRNP A1 antagonizes cellular senescence and induction of the senescence-associated secretory phenotype by stabilizing Oct-4 and sirtuin 1 mRNAs.
