= Collagenopathy, types II and XI =

Group of connective tissue conditions

The type II and XI collagenopathies are a group of disorders that affect connective tissue, the tissue that supports the body's joints and organs. These disorders are caused by defects in type II or type XI collagen. Collagens are complex molecules that provide structure, strength, and elasticity to connective tissue. Type II and type XI collagen disorders are grouped together because both types of collagen are components of the cartilage found in joints and the spinal column, the inner ear, and the jelly-like substance that fills the eyeball (the vitreous). The type II and XI collagenopathies result in similar clinical features.

== Types ==
Genetic changes are related to the following types of collagenopathy, types II and XI.

- achondrogenesis type 2
- hypochondrogenesis
- Kniest dysplasia
- otospondylomegaepiphyseal dysplasia
- spondyloepimetaphyseal dysplasia, Strudwick type
- spondyloepiphyseal dysplasia congenita
- spondyloperipheral dysplasia
- Stickler syndrome
- Weissenbacher-Zweymüller syndrome

The system for classifying collagenopathies is changing as researchers learn more about the genetic causes of these disorders. The clinical features of the type II and XI collagenopathies vary among the disorders, but there is considerable overlap. Common signs and symptoms include problems with bone development that can result in short stature, enlarged joints, spinal curvature, and arthritis at a young age. For some people, bone changes can be seen only on X-ray images. Problems with vision and hearing, as well as a cleft palate with a small lower jaw, are common. Some individuals with these disorders have distinctive facial features such as protruding eyes and a flat nasal bridge.

== Causes ==
Mutations in the COL11A1, COL11A2, and COL2A1 genes cause collagenopathy, types II and XI. These genes carry instructions for the protein strands that make up type II and type XI collagen. All collagen molecules are made of three protein strands (called alpha chains). The alpha chains may be identical or different, depending on the type of collagen. Type II collagen is made by combining three copies of the alpha chain made by the COL2A1 gene. Type XI collagen, on the other hand, is composed of three different alpha chains: the products of the COL2A1, COL11A1, and COL11A2 genes.

Mutations in these genes interfere with the proper assembly of type II and XI collagens or reduce the amount of these collagens. Defective or reduced numbers of collagen molecules affect the development of bones and other connective tissues, causing the signs and symptoms of the type II and XI collagenopathies.
