= Kniest dysplasia =

Human disease

- Specialty: Medical genetics

Kniest dysplasia is a rare form of dwarfism caused by a mutation in the COL2A1 gene on chromosome 12. The COL2A1 gene is responsible for producing type II collagen. The mutation of the COL2A1 gene leads to abnormal skeletal growth and problems with hearing and vision. What characterizes Kniest dysplasia from other type II osteochondrodysplasia is the level of severity and the dumb-bell shape of shortened long tubular bones.

This condition was first described by Dr. Wilhelm Kniest in 1952, publishing the case history of a 3 1/2 year-old girl. Dr. Kniest noticed that his patient had bone deformities and restricted joint mobility. The patient also had short stature and later developed blindness, resulting from retinal detachment and glaucoma. Upon analysis of the patient's DNA in 1992, sequencing revealed deletion of a 28 base pair sequence encompassing a splice site in exon 12 and a G to A transition in exon 50 of the COL2A1 gene.

This condition is very rare and occurs less than 1 in 1,000,000 people. Males and females have equal chances of having this condition. Currently, there is no cure for Kniest dysplasia. Alternative names for Kniest Dysplasia can include Kniest syndrome, swiss cheese cartilage syndrome, Kniest chondrodystrophy, or metatrophic dwarfism type II.

== Signs and symptoms ==
Because collagen plays an important role in the development of the body, people with Kniest Dysplasia will typically have their first symptoms at birth. These symptoms can include:

- Musculoskeletal Problems
  Cobb angle measurement of a dextroscoliosis
  - Short limbs
  - Shortened body trunk
  - Flattened bones in the spine (platyspondyly)
  - kyphoscoliosis
  - Scoliosis (Lateral curvature of the spine)
  - Early development of arthritis
- Respiratory problems
  - Respiratory tract infection
  - Difficulty breathing
- Eye problems
  - Severe myopia (near-sightedness)
  - Cataract (cloudiness in the lens of the eye)
  - Cranial structure may elongate the eyeball, causing a thinning of the retina, thereby predisposing retinal detachment
- Hearing problems
  - Progressive hearing loss
  - Ear infections

Most symptoms are chronic and will continue to worsen as the individual ages. It is essential to have regular checkups with general doctors, orthopedist, ophthalmologists, and/or otorhinolaryngologists. This will help to detect whether there are any changes that could cause concern.

== Genetics ==
Phenotype	Location	Gene/Locus	Gene/Locus MIM Number	Inheritance	Phenotype MIM Number	Phenotype Mapping Key
Kniest Dysplasia	12q13.11	COL2A1	120141	Autosomal Dominant	156550	3

== Mechanism ==
Studies have shown that a mutated COL2A1 gene is responsible for all type II chondrodysplasias, including Kniest dysplasia. It is believed that point mutations or the alteration of splice sites in COL2A1 domains will result in Kniest Dysplasia. The COL2A1 domain typically spans between exon 12 and 24. Mutations that occur at a splice donor site results in the loss of function at that site. This leads to the skipping of the exon and deletion of amino acids. The loss of these amino acids result in an abnormal procollagen II structure. The structure is not stable like the normal procollagen II structure and is normally degraded at a faster rate.

== Diagnosis ==
=== Family/medical history ===
An autosomal dominant pattern

Kniest dysplasia is an autosomal dominant condition. This means that the person only needs to have one copy of the mutated gene in order to have the condition. People with a family history are at a higher risk of having the disease than people with no family history. A random mutation in the gene can cause a person with no family history to also have the condition.

=== Diagnostic techniques ===
A combination of medical tests are used to diagnosis Kniest dysplasia. These tests can include:

- Computer Tomography Scan (CT scan) - This test uses multiple images taken at different angles to produce a cross-sectional image of the body.
- Magnetic Resonance Imaging (MRI) - This technique proves detailed images of the body by using magnetic fields and radio waves.
- EOS imaging - EOS imaging provides information on how musculoskeletal system interacts with the joints. The 3D image is scanned while the patient is standing and allows the physician to view the natural, weight-bearing posture.
- X-rays - X-ray images will allow the physician to have a closer look on whether or not the bones are growing abnormally.

The images taken will help to identify any bone anomalies. Two key features to look for in a patient with Kniest dysplasia is the presence of dumb-bell shaped femur bones and coronal clefts in the vertebrae. Other features to look for include:

- Platyspondyly (flat vertebral bodies)
- Kyphoscoliosis (abnormal rounding of the back and lateral curvature of the spine)
- Abnormal growth of epiphyses, metaphyses, and diaphysis
- Short tubular bones
- Narrowed joint spaces

Genetic Testing - A genetic sample may be taken in order to closely look at the patient's DNA. Finding an error in the COL2A1 gene will help identify the condition as a type II chondrodysplasia.

== Treatment ==
Because Kniest dysplasia can affect various body systems, treatments can vary between non-surgical and surgical treatment. Patients will be monitored over time, and treatments will be provided based on the complications that arise.

=== Surgical ===
- Spinal fusion for patients with severe kyphoscoliosis
- Extension Osteotomy to help treat progressive joint limitation
- Surgical realignment
- Retinal Detachment repair
- Myringotomy (surgical procedure to relieve pressure by draining fluid from the eardrum)

=== Non-surgical ===
- Routine monitoring
  The setup for BPAP using a mechanical ventilator
- Oxygen support, CPAP, bipap, mechanical ventilation
- Physical therapy
- Bracing

Like treatment options, the prognosis is dependent on the severity of the symptoms. Despite the various symptoms and limitations, most individuals have normal intelligence and can lead a normal life.

== Recent research ==
A recent article in 2015 reported a persistent notochord in a fetus at 23 weeks of gestation. The fetus had an abnormal spine, shortened long bones and a left clubfoot. After running postmortem tests and ultrasound, the researchers believed that the fetus suffered from hypochondrogenesis. Hypochondrogenesis is caused when type II collagen is abnormally formed due to a mutation in the COL2A1 gene. Normally, the cartilaginous notochord develops into the bony vertebrae in a human body. The COL2A1 gene results in malformed type II collagen, which is essential in the transition from collagen to bone. This is the first time that researchers found a persistent notochord in a human body due to a COL2A1 mutation.

== Eponym ==
It is named for Wilhelm Kniest.
