= Spondyloepimetaphyseal dysplasia, Strudwick type =

- Other names: Lower extremity-predominant autosomal dominant proximal spinal muscular atrophy
- Spondyloepimetaphyseal dysplasia, Strudwick type is inherited in an autosomal dominant pattern.

Spondyloepimetaphyseal dysplasia, Strudwick type is an inherited disorder of bone growth that results in dwarfism, characteristic skeletal abnormalities, and problems with vision. The name of the condition indicates that it affects the bones of the spine (spondylo-) and two regions near the ends of bones (epiphyses and metaphyses). This type was named after the first reported patient with the disorder. Spondyloepimetaphyseal dysplasia, Strudwick type is a subtype of type II collagenopathies.

The signs and symptoms of this condition at birth are very similar to those of spondyloepiphyseal dysplasia congenita, a related skeletal disorder. Beginning in childhood, the two conditions can be distinguished in X-ray images by changes in areas near the ends of bones (metaphyses).

== Presentation ==
People with this condition are short-statured from birth, with a very short trunk and shortened limbs. Their hands and feet, however, are usually average-sized. Curvature of the spine (scoliosis and lumbar lordosis) may be severe and can cause problems with breathing. Changes in the spinal bones (vertebrae) in the neck may also increase the risk of spinal cord damage. Other skeletal signs include flattened vertebrae (platyspondyly), severe protrusion of the breastbone (pectus carinatum), a hip joint deformity in which the upper leg bones turn inward (coxa vara), and a foot deformity known as clubfoot.

Affected individuals have mild and variable changes in their facial features. The cheekbones close to the nose may appear flattened. Some infants are born with an opening in the roof of the mouth, which is called a cleft palate. Severe nearsightedness (high myopia) and detachment of the retina (the part of the eye that detects light and color) are also common.

== Cause ==
This condition is one of a spectrum of skeletal disorders caused by mutations in the COL2A1 gene. The protein made by this gene forms type II collagen, a molecule found mostly in cartilage and in the clear gel that fills the eyeball (the vitreous). Type II collagen is essential for the normal development of bones and other connective tissues. Mutations in the COL2A1 gene interfere with the assembly of type II collagen molecules, which prevents bones from developing properly and causes the signs and symptoms of this condition.

This condition is inherited in an autosomal dominant pattern, which means one copy of the altered gene is sufficient to cause the disorder.
