= Mir-675 microRNA precursor family =

mir-675

Identifiers
- Symbol: mir-675
- Rfam: RF00897
- miRBase family: MIPF0000365

Other data
- RNA type: microRNA
- Domain: Eukaryota;
- PDB structures: PDBe

In molecular biology mir-675 microRNA is a short RNA molecule. MicroRNAs function to regulate the expression levels of other genes by several mechanisms.

== Inhibition of cell proliferation ==
miR-675 overexpression brings about reduced proliferation in a range of embryonic and extraembryonic stem cell lines. It has been found to be embedded in the first exon of the large intergenic non-coding RNA H19, which is responsible for limiting placental growth prior to birth. There is upregulation of the targets of miR-675 in placentas lacking H19; these include the insulin-like growth factor 1 receptor (IGF1R). Thus placentas lacking miR-675 continue to grow. It is possible that controlled miR-675 release from H19 may enable a rapid inhibition of cell proliferation in response to cellular stress or oncogenic signals.

== COL2A1 upregulation in Osteoarthritis ==
miR-675 has been found to be upregulated in osteoarthritic cartilage, alongside H19. Indeed, there is co-regulation of these two RNAs. The COL2A1 gene associated with osteoarthritis through altered expression levels compared with in normal tissue is upregulated by miR-675 overexpression. It has been proposed that miR-675 may modulate collagen type II levels via an unknown target molecule, and there is potential for a diagnostic metabolic balance indicator in osteoarthritis through this microRNA.

== See also ==
- MicroRNA
