= Platyspondylic lethal skeletal dysplasia, Torrance type =

- Other names: Platyspondylic dysplasia, Torrance-Luton type
- Platyspondylic lethal skeletal dysplasia, Torrance type is inherited in an autosomal dominant pattern.

Platyspondylic lethal skeletal dysplasia, Torrance type is a severe disorder of bone growth. People with this condition have very short arms and legs, a small chest with short ribs, underdeveloped pelvic bones, and unusually short fingers and toes (brachydactyly). This disorder is also characterized by flattened spinal bones (platyspondyly) and abnormal curvature of the spine (lordosis).

As a result of these serious skeletal problems, many infants with platyspondylic lethal skeletal dysplasia, Torrance type are born prematurely, are stillborn, or die shortly after birth from respiratory failure. A few affected people with milder signs and symptoms have lived into adulthood.

== Cause ==
This condition is one of a spectrum of skeletal disorders caused by mutations in the COL2A1 gene. This gene provides instructions for making a protein that forms type II collagen. This type of collagen is found mostly in cartilage and in the clear gel that fills the eyeball (the vitreous). It is essential for the normal development of bones and other tissues that form the body's supportive framework (connective tissues).

== Genetics ==
Mutations in the COL2A1 gene interfere with the assembly of type II collagen molecules, resulting in a reduced amount of this type of collagen in the body. Instead of forming collagen molecules, the abnormal COL2A1 protein builds up in cartilage cells (chondrocytes). These changes disrupt the normal development of bones and other connective tissues, leading to the skeletal abnormalities characteristic of platyspondylic lethal skeletal dysplasia, Torrance type.

This condition is inherited in an autosomal dominant pattern, which means one copy of the altered gene in each cell is sufficient to cause the disorder. In some cases, an affected person inherits the mutation from one affected parent. Other cases may result from new mutations in the gene. These cases occur in people with no history of the disorder in their family.
