= Otospondylomegaepiphyseal dysplasia =

- Otospondylomegaepiphyseal dysplasia has an autosomal recessive pattern of inheritance.
- Specialty: Medical genetics

Otospondylomegaepiphyseal dysplasia (OSMED) is an autosomal recessive disorder of bone growth that results in skeletal abnormalities, severe hearing loss, and distinctive facial features. The name of the condition indicates that it affects hearing (oto-) and the bones of the spine (spondylo-), and enlarges the ends of bones (megaepiphyses).

The features of OSMED are similar to those of another skeletal disorder, Weissenbacher-Zweymüller syndrome. Otospondylomegaepiphyseal dysplasia is a subtype of collagenopathy, types II and XI.

== Pathophysiology ==
Mutations in the COL11A2 gene cause otospondylomegaepiphyseal dysplasia. The protein made by the COL11A2 gene is involved in the production of type XI collagen. This type of collagen is important for the normal development of bone and other connective tissues. Mutations in the COL11A2 gene lead to a loss of function of this type of collagen, resulting in the signs and symptoms of OSMED.

OSMED is inherited in an autosomal recessive pattern, which means the defective gene is located on an autosome, and two copies of the defective gene - one from each parent - must be inherited for a person to be affected by the disorder. The parents of a child with an autosomal recessive disorder are usually not affected but are carriers of one copy of the altered gene. A recessive pattern of inheritance makes OSMED unique among the type II and type XI collagenopathies.

== Diagnosis ==
The distinctive characteristics of OSMED include severe bone and joint problems and very severe hearing loss. This disorder affects the epiphyses, the parts of the bone where growth occurs. People with the condition are often shorter than average because the bones in their arms and legs are unusually short. Other skeletal signs include enlarged joints, short hands and fingers, and flat bones of the spine (vertebrae). People with the disorder often experience back and joint pain, limited joint movement, and arthritis that begins early in life. Severe high-tone hearing loss is common. Typical facial features include protruding eyes; a sunken nasal bridge; an upturned nose with a large, rounded tip; and a small lower jaw. Some affected infants are born with an opening in the roof of the mouth, which is called a cleft palate.

== Treatment ==
Treatment is symptomatic only, involving closure of the cleft palate, audiometry and adapted management of the hearing loss, and treatment of the joint pain.

== Epidemiology ==
The frequency of this disorder is unknown, but it is very rare. Only a few families with the condition have been reported.

== Bibliography ==
- Melkoniemi M, Brunner HG, Manouvrier S, Hennekam R, Superti-Furga A, Kaariainen H, Pauli RM, van Essen T, Warman ML, Bonaventure J, Miny P, Ala-Kokko L (2000). "Autosomal recessive disorder otospondylomegaepiphyseal dysplasia is associated with loss-of-function mutations in the COL11A2 gene". Am J Hum Genet. 66 (2): 368–77. doi:10.1086/302750. PMC 1288089. PMID 10677296.
- van Steensel MA, Buma P, de Waal Malefijt MC, van den Hoogen FH, Brunner HG (1997). "Oto- spondylo-megaepiphyseal dysplasia (OSMED): clinical description of three patients homozygous for a missense mutation in the COL11A2 gene" (PDF). Am J Med Genet. 70 (3): 315–23. doi:10.1002/(SICI)1096-8628(19970613)70:3<315::AID-AJMG19>3.0.CO;2-O. hdl:2066/24596. PMID 9188673. S2CID 20127516.
