= COL2 =

COL2 can refer to:

- Orangeville/Laurel Aerodrome
- Type-II collagen
