= Bertolotti's syndrome =

Congenital condition

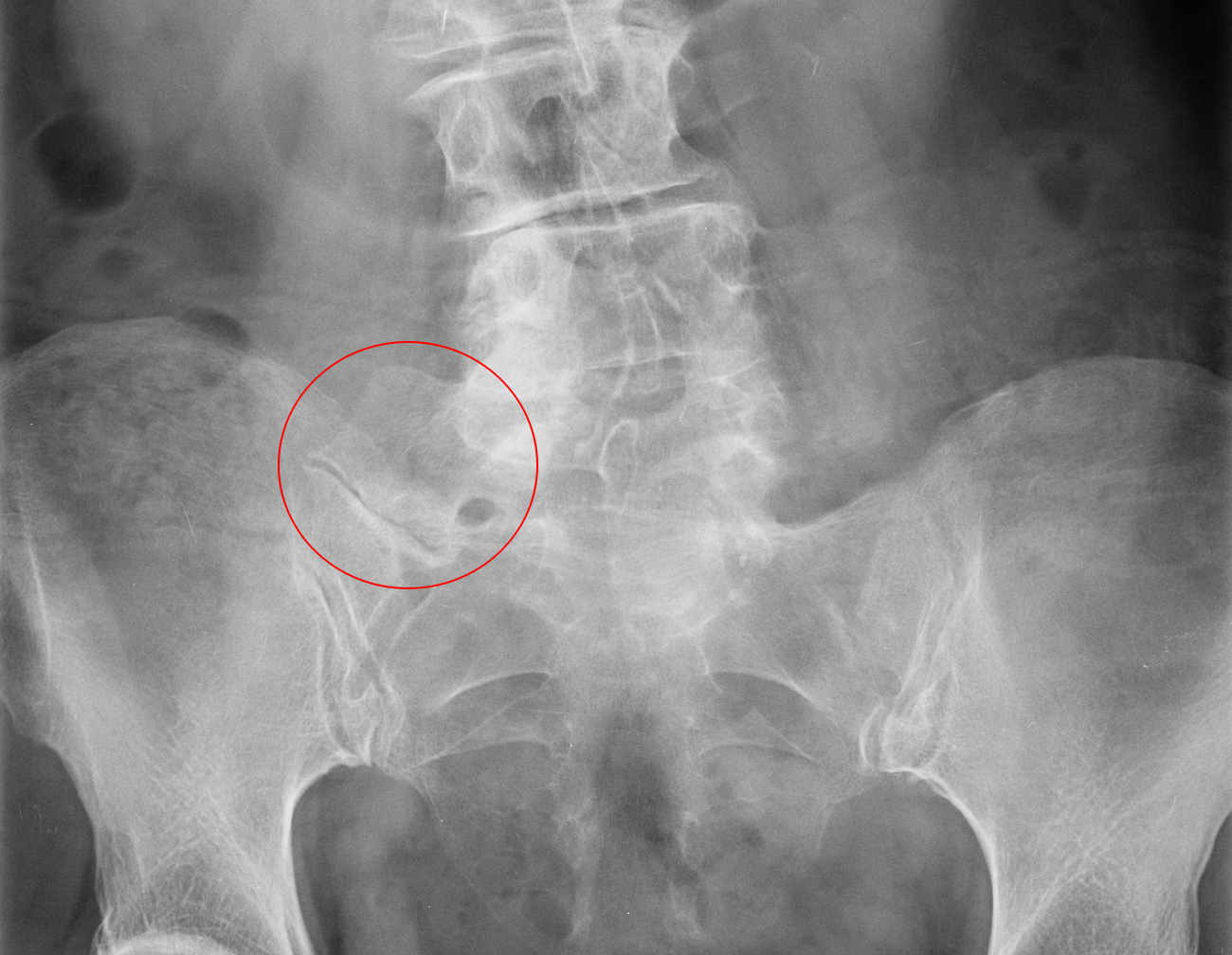
- X-ray of Bertolotti's syndrome (in this case, right transverse mega-apophysis of L5 with pseudoarticulation with the sacral ala). Woman 67 years old.

Bertolotti's syndrome is a commonly missed cause of back pain which occurs due to lumbosacral transitional vertebrae (LSTV). It is a congenital condition but is not usually symptomatic until one's twenties or early thirties. However, there are a few cases of Bertolotti's that become symptomatic at a much earlier age.

It is named for Mario Bertolotti, an Italian physician who first described it in 1917.

== Distinction between LSTV and Bertolotti's Syndrome ==
The presence of LSTV is an anatomical observation. Bertolotti's Syndrome, however, is a clinical diagnosis made only when this LSTV is definitively identified as the source of a patient's chronic low back pain and associated symptoms.

This distinction is of paramount clinical importance because a significant portion of individuals with LSTV remain entirely asymptomatic throughout their lives.[ref needed] The challenge for clinicians, therefore, is not merely to identify the LSTV on an imaging study but to rigorously prove its causal relationship to the patient's pain, a process that often requires a combination of detailed imaging and diagnostic injections. Without investigation, the condition is frequently overlooked, leading to prolonged periods of patient suffering and ineffective treatments directed at other potential pain sources.

== Presentation ==
A chronic, persistent low back pain along with buttock pain is the most important presentation. The main direct causes of pain in patients with Bertolotti's Syndrome are as follows:

Arthritis of the pseudo-articulation – In LSTV types where the transverse process forms a “false joint” with the sacrum (i.e., type II & type IV), the bone-on-bone contact leads to mechanical grinding, inflammation, and the formation of osteophytes. This can lead to direct localized, aching pain.

Radiculopathy – Radiculopathy (i.e., pain radiating down the leg) can occur through several mechanisms. This can be caused by direct compression of the exiting L5 nerve root due to the enlarged transverse process. Alternatively, the local inflammation caused by osteophyte formation due to pseudo-articulation can lead to irritation of the exiting L5 nerve root. Alternatively, the hypermobility at the L4-L5 level due to LSTV can cause disc herniation at L4 or L5.

== Pathophysiology ==
Bertolotti's syndrome is characterized by sacralization of the lowest lumbar vertebral body or the lumbarization of the uppermost sacral segment. It involves a total or partial unilateral or bilateral fusion of the transverse process of the lowest lumbar vertebra to the sacrum, leading to the formation of a transitional 5th lumbar vertebra. The transitional anatomy results in one or both of the transverse process (i.e., look like wings on the vertebra) of the last lumbar segment to be enlarged. Consequently, the transverse process can come in contact with the sacrum, the iliac crest, or both. This results in limited / altered motion at the lumbosacral segment. This loss of motion will then be compensated for at segments superior to the transitional vertebra. In some cases, this altered biomechanics leads to degeneration, herniation, or fissure of the L4 disc. Scoliosis is frequently found to be associated.

=== Classification ===
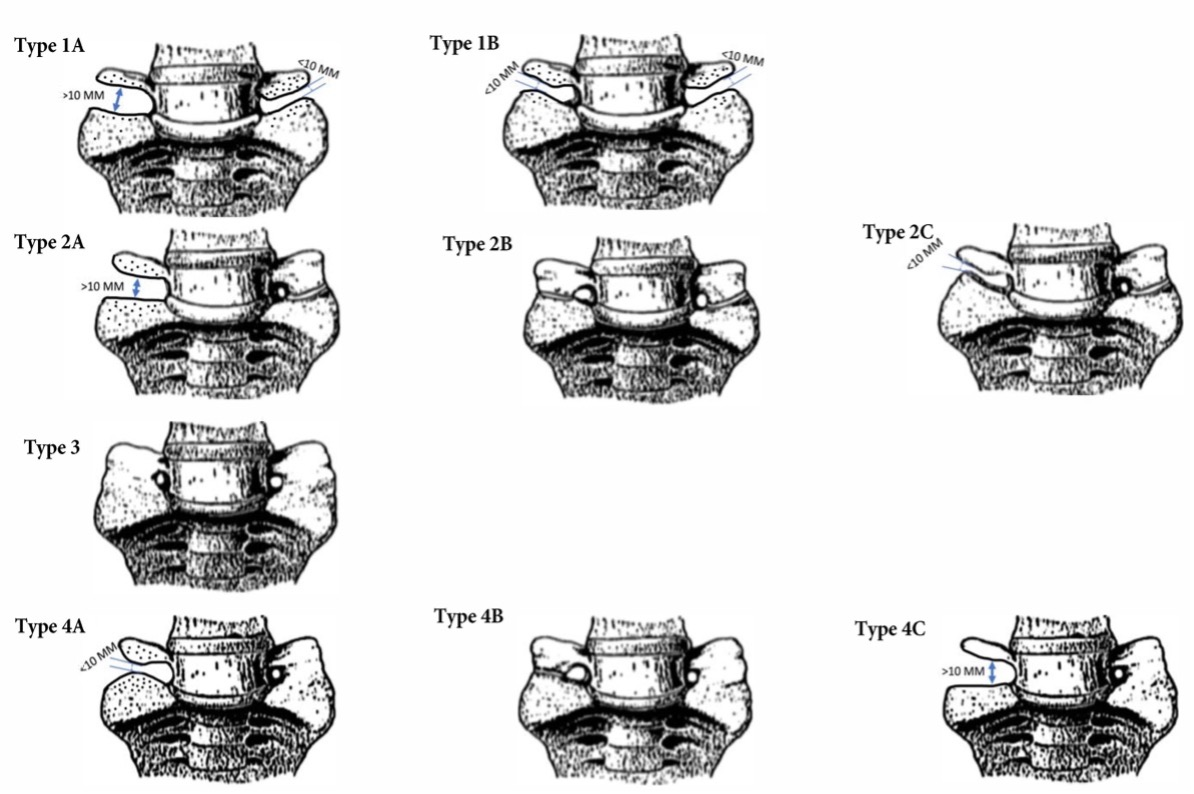
Schematic presentation of the classification of unilateral and bilateral LSTV according to the proposed Jenkins classification

The different types of LSTV were first classified by Antonio Castellvi aptly named the Castellvi classification. In his classification, he identified 7 types of LSTV. However, this Castellvi developed this classification for the purposes of identifying risk of disc herniation in patients, not for Bertolotti's Syndrome patients.

In 2023, Dr. Arthur Jenkins published a revised version of LSTV classification called the Jenkins Classification. The Jenkins classification is separated into 4 categories: Type 1, 2, 3, and 4 with subclassifications of: L (left) or R (right) prominence, A (unilateral), B (bilateral), or C (Type 2 with Type 1 and contralateral 2 anatomy or Type 4 with a gap > 10 mm and contralateral Type 3 anatomy), + L (left) or R (right) iliac contact.

Type 1: A dysplastic transverse process that shows a gap of less than 10mm, but greater than 2mm across the lumbosacral junction.

Type 2: Pseudo-articulation between adjacent transverse processes with a gap of less than 2 mm.

Type 3: Complete fusion lateral to the facet at the ala, without spontaneous fusion of the disk or facet joints, of the lumbosacral junction.

Type 4: Presence of unilaterally fused side with varying pseudoarticulation on the contralateral side (Type 4A, 4B, or 4C).

== Diagnosis ==
The diagnosis depends on appropriate patient history backed by imaging studies like X ray and MRI. Lumbosacral spine radiographs like CT Lumbar help in the identification of the skeletal abnormality. MRI helps in confirmation of disc trouble. CT is also utilized to visualize the bone deformity.

== Treatment ==
Non-surgical treatments include steroid injections in the lower back or radiofrequency sensory ablation. Physical therapy interventions are also helpful in early cases and are focused on mobilization, neural stretching, and core strengthening exercises. Surgical intervention is usually a last resort if all conservative methods fail. It can be treated surgically with posterolateral fusion and resection or solely by resection of the enlarged transverse process.
