= Collagen, type XI, alpha 2 =

Protein found in humans

COL11A2

Identifiers
- Aliases: COL11A2, DFNA13, DFNB53, FBCG2, HKE5, PARP, STL3, collagen type XI alpha 2, collagen type XI alpha 2 chain, OSMEDB, OSMEDA
- External IDs: OMIM: 120290; MGI: 88447; GeneCards: COL11A2

Gene location (Human)
Chr.	Chromosome 6 (human)
Band	6p21.32	Start	33,162,681 bp
Band	6p21.32	End	33,192,499 bp

Gene location (Mouse)
Chr.	Chromosome 17 (mouse)
Band	17 B1|17 17.98 cM	Start	34,258,411 bp
Band	17 B1|17 17.98 cM	End	34,285,659 bp
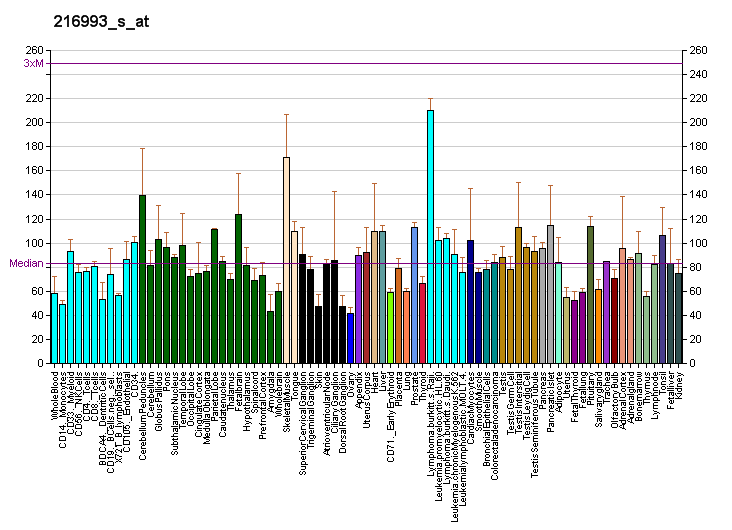

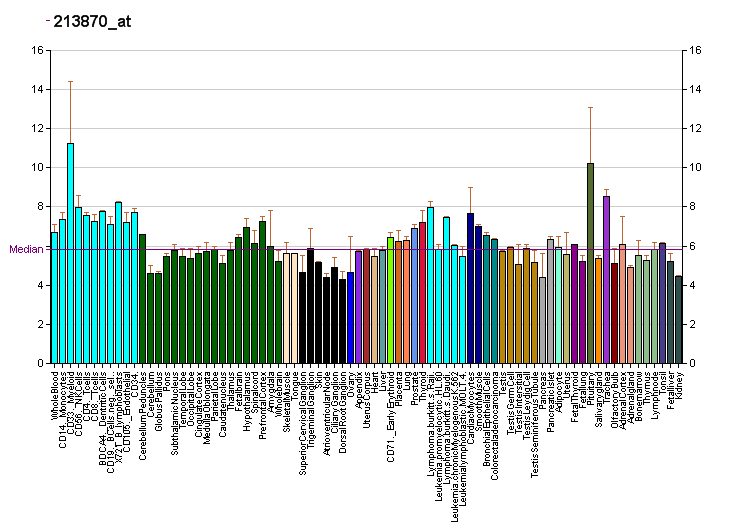
RNA expression pattern
Bgee	Human / Mouse (ortholog); Top expressed in: pituitary gland; testicle; anterior pituitary; right hemisphere of cerebellum; C1 segment; putamen; right frontal lobe; substantia nigra; hippocampus proper; Brodmann area 9 / Top expressed in: body of femur; molar; calvaria; tibiofemoral joint; stria vascularis; fossa; lumbar subsegment of spinal cord; trachea; ankle; vestibular membrane of cochlear duct; More reference expression data
BioGPS	More reference expression data
Gene ontology
Molecular function	protein-macromolecule adaptor activity; extracellular matrix structural constituent; protein binding; extracellular matrix structural constituent conferring tensile strength; metal ion binding
Cellular component	extracellular region; collagen; endoplasmic reticulum lumen; collagen type XI trimer; extracellular space; extracellular matrix; collagen-containing extracellular matrix
Biological process	soft palate development; skeletal system development; roof of mouth development; cartilage development; hearing; collagen fibril organization; extracellular matrix organization
Sources:Amigo / QuickGO
Orthologs
Databases	NCBI: entry; OMA: entry
Species	Human	Mouse
Entrez	1302	12815
Ensembl	ENSG00000204248; ENSG00000232541; ENSG00000227801; ENSG00000230930; ENSG00000206290 ENSG00000235708; ENSG00000223699	ENSMUSG00000024330
UniProt	P13942	Q64739
RefSeq (mRNA)	NM_001163771; NM_080679; NM_080680; NM_080681	NM_009926; NM_001317722; NM_001401301
RefSeq (protein)	NP_001157243; NP_542410; NP_542411; NP_542412	NP_001304651; NP_034056
Location (UCSC)	Chr 6: 33.16 – 33.19 Mb	Chr 17: 34.26 – 34.29 Mb
PubMed search
- Wikidata
View/Edit Human	View/Edit Mouse

Collagen alpha-2(XI) chain is a protein that in humans is encoded by the COL11A2 gene.

The COL11A2 gene produces one component of this type of collagen, called the pro-alpha2(XI) chain. Type XI collagen adds structure and strength to the tissues that support the body's muscles, joints, organs and skin (the connective tissue). Type XI collagen is normally found in cartilage as well as the fluid that fills the eyeball, the inner ear, and the center portion of the discs between the vertebrae in the spine (nucleus pulposus). Type XI collagen also helps maintain the spacing and diameter of type II collagen fibrils. Type II collagen is an important component of the eye and mature cartilage tissue. The size and arrangement of type II collagen fibrils is essential for the normal structure of these tissues.

The pro-alpha2(XI) chain combines with pro-alpha1(XI) and pro-alpha1(II)collagen chains to form a procollagen molecule. These triple-stranded, ropelike procollagen molecules must be processed by enzymes in the cell. Once processed, these procollagen molecules leave the cell and arrange themselves into long, thin fibrils that cross-link to one another in the spaces around cells. The cross-linkages result in the formation of very strong mature type XI collagen fibers.

The COL11A2 gene is located on the short (p) arm of chromosome 6 at position 21.3, from base pair 33,238,446 to base pair 33,268,222.

== Function ==
This gene encodes one of the two alpha chains of type XI collagen, a minor fibrillar collagen. It is located on chromosome 6 very close to but separate from the gene for retinoid X receptor beta. Type XI collagen is a heterotrimer but the third alpha chain is a post-translationally modified alpha 1 type II chain. Proteolytic processing of this type XI chain produces PARP, a proline/arginine-rich protein that is an amino terminal domain. Mutations in this gene are associated with type III Stickler syndrome, otospondylomegaepiphyseal dysplasia (OSMED syndrome), Weissenbacher-Zweymuller syndrome, and autosomal dominant nonsyndromic sensorineural 13 deafness. Three transcript variants encoding different isoforms have been identified for this gene.

== Clinical significance ==
=== Nonsyndromic deafness ===
Mutations in the COL11A2 gene have been shown to cause hearing loss without other signs or symptoms (nonsyndromic deafness autosomal dominant) in two large families. One family carries a mutation that substitutes the amino acid cysteine (a building block of proteins) for the amino acid arginine at position 549 (written as Arg549Cys) in the alpha 2 chain of type XI collagen. A second family has a mutation that substitutes the amino acid glutamic acid for the amino acid glycine at position 323 (written as Gly323Glu) in this protein. These mutations prevent the normal assembly of type XI collagen. Type XI collagen plays an important role in the structure and function of the inner ear. When mutations in the COL11A2 gene affect the structure of collagen fibrils, hearing loss can result.

=== Otospondylomegaepiphyseal dysplasia ===
Approximately 10 mutations identified in the COL11A2 gene are responsible for otospondylomegaepiphyseal dysplasia (OSMED). Most of these mutations result in a complete lack of pro-alpha2(XI) chains, which leads to a loss of function of type XI collagen. Some mutations affect the production of the pro-alpha2(XI) chain and disrupt normal collagen assembly. Because this type of collagen is an important component of cartilage and other connective tissues, these mutations result in the characteristic signs and symptoms of OSMED.

=== Stickler syndrome ===
Stickler syndrome (COL11A2): Stickler syndrome is a disorder that causes problems with skeletal development, vision, and hearing. Mutations in the COL11A2 gene cause a form of Stickler in which vision is not affected. COL11A2 mutations cause abnormal production of the pro-alpha2(XI) chain, part of type XI collagen. As a result, type XI collagen is impaired and cannot function properly, causing the skeletal and hearing problems characteristic of Stickler syndrome. The pro-alpha2(XI) chain, however, is not made in the eyes. Instead, another type of collagen chain replaces pro-alpha2(XI) to form type XI collagen in the vitreous of the eye. COL11A2 mutations, therefore, do not affect vision.

=== Weissenbacher-Zweymüller syndrome ===
At least one identified mutation in the COL11A2 gene is responsible for Weissenbacher-Zweymüller syndrome. This mutation causes the amino acid glycine to be replaced with the amino acid glutamic acid at position 955 in the alpha 2 chain of type XI collagen (written as Gly955Glu). This mutation prevents collagen molecules from being assembled properly, which disrupts the structure of type XI collagen. These changes result in the characteristic signs and symptoms of Weissenbacher-Zweymüller syndrome.

=== Vasculitis ===
A link has been shown between ANCA-associated vasculitis and SNPs in the COL11A2 gene in a Genomewide Association Study. It is proposed that this association may be due to linkage disequilibrium between a SNP in the HLA-DP locus and SNPs in COL11A2. This is theorised as the SNP in the HLA molecule was found to be very strongly associated with these diseases with evidence for a single genetic association.
