= Hypochondrogenesis =

- Specialty: Medical genetics

Hypochondrogenesis is a severe genetic disorder causing malformations of bone growth. The condition is characterized by a short body and limbs and abnormal bone formation in the spine and pelvis.

Hypochondrogenesis is a subtype of collagenopathy, types II and XI, and is similar to another skeletal disorder, achondrogenesis type 2, although the spinal changes seen in hypochondrogenesis tend to be somewhat milder.

== Signs and symptoms ==
Symptoms of hypochondrogenesis include: edema, limb undergrowth, spondyloepiphyseal dysplasia, short ribs, respiratory failure, short chin, upper limb undergrowth, thoracic hypoplasia, hypertelorism, hydrops fetalis, pulmonary hypoplasia, and a cleft palate.

== Pathophysiology ==
Hypochondrogenesis is one of the most severe conditions in a spectrum of disorders caused by mutations in the COL2A1 gene. The protein made by this gene forms type II collagen, a molecule found mostly in cartilage and in the clear gel that fills the eyeball (the vitreous). Type II collagen is essential for the normal development of bones and other connective tissues (tissues that form the body's supportive framework). Mutations in the COL2A1 gene interfere with the assembly of type II collagen molecules, which prevents bones from developing properly.

This condition is caused by new mutations in the COL2A1 gene. Hypochondrogenesis is considered an autosomal dominant disorder because the affected gene is located on an autosome, and only one copy of the altered gene is necessary to cause the condition. The disorder is not passed on to the next generation, however, because affected individuals do not live long enough to have children.

== Diagnosis ==
Affected infants have short arms and legs, a small chest with short ribs, and underdeveloped lungs. The spinal bones (vertebrae) in the neck and part of the pelvis (the sacrum) do not harden, or ossify, properly. The face appears flat and oval-shaped, with widely spaced eyes, a small chin, and, in some cases, an opening in the roof of the mouth called a cleft palate. The abdomen is enlarged, and excess fluid may build up in the body before birth (a condition called hydrops fetalis).

As a result of these serious health problems, infants are usually premature and stillborn or die shortly after birth from respiratory failure. Some infants have lived for a time, however, with intensive medical support. Babies who live past the newborn period are usually reclassified as having spondyloepiphyseal dysplasia congenita, a related disorder on the spectrum of abnormal bone growth.

== Treatment ==
There is no cure or treatment for hypochondrogenesis.
