= Collagen, type II, alpha 1 =

Protein-coding gene in humans

COL2A1
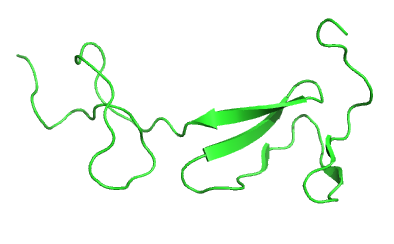

Identifiers
- Aliases: COL2A1, AOM, COL11A3, Cartilage collagen, ANFH, STL1, collagen type II alpha 1, collagen type II alpha 1 chain, SEDC, Collagen II
- External IDs: OMIM: 120140; MGI: 88452; GeneCards: COL2A1
Available structures
PDB	Ortholog search: PDBe RCSB
PDB	List of PDB id codes 1U5M, 2FSE, 2SEB

Gene location (Human)
Chr.	Chromosome 12 (human)
Band	12q13.11	Start	47,972,967 bp
Band	12q13.11	End	48,004,554 bp

Gene location (Mouse)
Chr.	Chromosome 15 (mouse)
Band	15 F1|15 53.97 cM	Start	97,873,483 bp
Band	15 F1|15 53.97 cM	End	97,902,576 bp
RNA expression pattern
Bgee	Human / Mouse (ortholog); Top expressed in: tibia; cartilage tissue; corpus epididymis; trachea; sperm; trabecular bone; tail of epididymis; testicle; pituitary gland; gonad / Top expressed in: tibiofemoral joint; vestibular sensory epithelium; human fetus; cartilage organ; otic vesicle; saccule; set of bones of free part of upper limb; trachea; hand; nasal septum; More reference expression data
BioGPS	n/a
Gene ontology
Molecular function	identical protein binding; platelet-derived growth factor binding; extracellular matrix structural constituent conferring tensile strength; extracellular matrix structural constituent; metal ion binding; MHC class II protein binding; proteoglycan binding
Cellular component	endoplasmic reticulum lumen; collagen type II trimer; collagen; extracellular matrix; cytoplasm; basement membrane; extracellular space; extracellular region; collagen-containing extracellular matrix
Biological process	proteoglycan metabolic process; central nervous system development; endochondral ossification; chondrocyte differentiation; collagen fibril organization; ossification; limb morphogenesis; otic vesicle development; notochord development; negative regulation of extrinsic apoptotic signaling pathway in absence of ligand; heart morphogenesis; inner ear morphogenesis; inner ear development; tissue homeostasis; regulation of immune response; cartilage development involved in endochondral bone morphogenesis; hearing; skeletal system development; collagen catabolic process; regulation of gene expression; bone development; extracellular matrix organization; skeletal system morphogenesis; cellular response to BMP stimulus; visual perception; roof of mouth development; embryonic skeletal joint morphogenesis; cartilage development; limb bud formation; cartilage condensation; anterior head development
Sources:Amigo / QuickGO
Orthologs
Databases	NCBI: entry; OMA: entry
Species	Human	Mouse
Entrez	1280	12824
Ensembl	ENSG00000139219	ENSMUSG00000022483
UniProt	P02458	P28481
RefSeq (mRNA)	NM_001844; NM_033150	NM_001113515; NM_031163
RefSeq (protein)	NP_001835; NP_149162	NP_001106987; NP_112440
Location (UCSC)	Chr 12: 47.97 – 48 Mb	Chr 15: 97.87 – 97.9 Mb
PubMed search
- Wikidata
View/Edit Human	View/Edit Mouse

Collagen, type II, alpha 1 (primary osteoarthritis, spondyloepiphyseal dysplasia, congenital), also known as COL2A1, is a human gene that provides instructions for the production of the pro-alpha1(II) chain of type II collagen.

== Gene ==
The COL2A1 gene is located on the long (q) arm of chromosome 12 between positions 13.11 and 13.2, from base pair 46,653,017 to base pair 46,684,527. The expression of COL2A1 is regulated by SOX-9 and retrotransposon gag-like-3 gene RTL3 in chondrocytes.

There are two transcripts identified for this gene.

== Function ==
This gene encodes the alpha-1 chain of type II collagen, a fibrillar collagen found in cartilage and the vitreous humor of the eye.

Type II collagen, which adds structure and strength to connective tissues, is found primarily in cartilage, the jelly-like substance that fills the eyeball (the vitreous), the inner ear, and the center portion of the discs between the vertebrae in the spine (nucleus pulposus). Three pro-alpha1(II) chains twist together to form a triple-stranded, ropelike procollagen molecule. These procollagen molecules must be processed by enzymes in the cell. Once these molecules are processed, they leave the cell and arrange themselves into long, thin fibrils that cross-link to one another in the spaces around cells. The cross-linkages result in the formation of very strong mature type II collagen fibers.

== Clinical significance ==
Mutations in the COL2A1 gene are associated with achondrogenesis, chondrodysplasia, early onset familial osteoarthritis, SED congenita, Langer–Saldino achondrogenesis, Kniest dysplasia, Stickler syndrome, and spondyloepimetaphyseal dysplasia Strudwick type. In addition, defects in processing chondrocalcin, a calcium binding protein that is the C-propeptide of this collagen molecule, are also associated with chondrodysplasia.

=== Achondrogenesis type 2 ===
Several kinds of mutations in the COL2A1 gene are responsible for achondrogenesis type 2. These include missing pieces of the gene, substitution of the amino acid glycine with another amino acid, or changes that result in truncated proteins. All these mutations disrupt the production of mature type II collagen, affecting tissues rich in this collagen.

=== Platyspondylic lethal skeletal dysplasia, Torrance type ===
Fewer than 10 COL2A1 mutations have been identified in people with platyspondylic lethal skeletal dysplasia, Torrance type. Most result in a single amino acid change in the pro-alpha1(II) chain, producing an abnormal chain that cannot be incorporated into collagen fibers. This leads to reduced collagen production and skeletal abnormalities such as short limbs, small chest, flattened vertebrae, and short fingers and toes.

=== Hypochondrogenesis ===
Hypochondrogenesis is caused by various COL2A1 mutations, including deletions, glycine substitutions, and truncations. These interfere with the formation of mature, triple-stranded type II collagen molecules, affecting collagen-rich tissues.

=== Kniest dysplasia ===
Most mutations responsible for Kniest dysplasia result in abnormally short pro-alpha1(II) collagen chains that combine with normal-length chains, producing shorter-than-normal collagen molecules. This results in the characteristic features of Kniest dysplasia.

=== Spondyloepimetaphyseal dysplasia ===
All known COL2A1 mutations in spondyloepimetaphyseal dysplasia, Strudwick type replace glycine with another amino acid in the pro-alpha1(II) chain, disrupting the formation of stable, triple-stranded collagen molecules.

Spondyloepiphyseal dysplasia congenita is caused by several types of COL2A1 mutations, including incorrect amino acid substitutions and truncated pro-alpha1(II) chains, impairing the formation of mature collagen molecules.

In spondyloperipheral dysplasia, COL2A1 mutations produce a truncated pro-alpha1(II) chain that cannot be incorporated into collagen fibers. The abnormal chains accumulate in cartilage cells, disrupting bone development and resulting in flattened vertebrae and short digits.

=== Stickler syndrome ===
Several COL2A1 mutations cause Stickler syndrome, often leading to the production of a truncated protein that cannot be incorporated into collagen fibers. Many mutations introduce premature stop signals, resulting in a 50% reduction of pro-alpha1(II) collagen chains and underproduction of type II collagen in cartilage.

=== Osteoarthritis risk ===
Variations in the COL2A1 gene may increase susceptibility to osteoarthritis in some individuals. These variations alter amino acids in the pro-alpha1(II) chain, potentially affecting collagen fiber integrity in joint cartilage and contributing to degenerative joint disease.
