= Weissenbacher–Zweymüller syndrome =

- Autosomal recessive inheritance
- Specialty: Medical genetics

Weissenbacher–Zweymuller syndrome (WZS), also called Pierre-Robin syndrome with fetal chondrodysplasia, is an autosomal recessive congenital disorder, linked to mutations (955 gly -> glu) in the COL11A2 gene (located on chromosomal position 6p21.3), which codes for the α_{2} strand of collagen type XI. It is a collagenopathy, types II and XI disorder. The condition was first characterized in 1964 by G. Weissenbacher and Ernst Zweymüller.

== Presentation ==
The disorder causes facial abnormalities, skeletal malformation and occasionally neural tube defects; the skeletal disfigurements resolve to a degree in the course of development.

Mutations in different parts of the gene may lead to deafness or Stickler syndrome type III (myopia, retinal detachment and skeletal abnormalities).

Infants and children: Infants that are born with Weissenbacher-Zweymüller syndrome usually have short bones in their arms and legs. The thigh and upper arm bones are wider than usual resulting in a dumbbell-shape while the bones of the vertebrae may be abnormal. Typical abnormal facial features can be wide-set protruding eyes (hypertelorism), a small and upturned nose with a flat bridge, small jaw (micrognathia) and a cleft palate. Some infants have high-frequency hearing loss. Infants may also exhibit a psychomotor delay. After the period of growth deficiency the individual makes improvements in bone growth leading to a normal physical development around age 5 or 6.

Adults: Many with Weissenbacher-Zweymüller syndrome have a catch-up growth phase causing the adults to not be unusually short. Many adults still will have hearing loss and typical abnormal facial features of Weissenbacher-Zweymüller syndrome.

== Causes ==
Dominant genetic disorders can be caused by just a single copy of an abnormal gene. This abnormal gene can be the result of being inherited from either parent or be a new mutation. Most cases are caused by a de novo (new) mutation in the gene that occurs during the formation of the egg or sperm. These cases occur when there is no history of the disorder in the family. The COL11A2 gene is responsible for providing instructions on making one component of the type XI collagen. Type XI collagen is a complex molecule that helps give structure and strength to the connective tissues. Collagen is found in bone. It is also found in cartilage that makes up most of the skeleton during early development. The mutation of COL11A2 in Weissenbacher-Zweymüller syndrome disrupts the assembly of the type XI collagen molecules. The malfunctioning collagen weakens the connective tissue causing impaired bone development. COL11A2 is also associated with autosomal dominant non-syndromic hearing loss (ADNSHL). All mutations of COL11A2 in ADNSHL are missense mutations.

== Diagnosis ==
Weissenbacher-Zweymüller syndrome is diagnosed upon a thorough clinical evaluation, detailed patient history, identification of characteristic symptom and a variety of specialized tests which includes x-rays.

== Treatment ==
Because there is no cure, treatment is directed towards the specific symptoms that are present in each individual.

== Epidemiology ==
Weissenbacher-Zweymüller syndrome affects males and females in the same numbers. About 30 cases have been reported in medical literature. The disorder can be underdiagnosed causing no true frequency in the population.
