= Chondrocalcin =

Protein found in humans

Chondrocalcin comes from a family of pro-collagen molecules. This protein is found in the bone and is involved in calcium-binding, which occurs in order to harden (or calcify) the cartilage. Another one of its roles is to assemble the triple collagen helix, which is predominately entails the linkage of glycine and proline amino acids and then the twisting of those linkages. Chondrocalcin is important because cartilage calcification of the growth plate is one of the main occurrences in endochondral bone formation. Because of its importance, it is one of the most highly created polypeptides in human cartilage. This calcium-binding protein comes from chondrocytes, which are cells that produce and maintain cartilage. Some examples of chondrocytes include collagen and proteoglycans. The chondrocytes that produce chondrocalcin are typically found in growing bone matrices that have not yet matured. These immature bone matrices are found in the epiphyseal plate at both the lower hypertrophic zone and the longitudinal septa of the cartilaginous matrix. One study was conducted on fetal cartilage discovered that the chondrocalcin protein exists as a dimer with 35,000 g/mol subunits. The reason why fetal cartilage was used is because chondrocalcin cannot be detected in mature bone. Another investigation was conducted to determine the mechanism behind calcium binding in chondrocalcin. It was discovered that along with cartilage building, the protein also had a role in cartilage destruction.
