= Achondrogenesis type 2 =

- Achondrogenesis type 2 has an autosomal dominant method of inheritance.
- Specialty: Medical genetics

Achondrogenesis, type 2 is an uncommon skeletal dysplasia that is autosomal dominant and occurs at a frequency of approximately 0.2 per 100,000 births. Also known by the name Langer–Saldino achondrogenesis, it is one of the fatal short-limbed dwarfisms linked to structural mutations in type II collagen.

Typically, achondrogenesis type II manifests in the perinatal period as short stature, edema/hydropic look, narrow chest with pulmonary hypoplasia, severely short limbs (micromelia), and extraskeletal characteristics (e.g., flat midface, Pierre Robin sequence). Most of these babies are stillborn, delivered before their due date, or die from cardiorespiratory failure soon after delivery, meaning that they do not live to term.

== Signs and symptoms ==
The characteristic features of achondrogenesis type 2 are short arms and legs, a tiny chest with short ribs, lung hypoplasia, a small chin, a prominent forehead, and an enlarged abdomen that may also include hydrops, and polyhydramnios.

== Causes ==
Mutations in the COL2A1 gene can cause a number of skeletal abnormalities, including achondrogenesis type 2. Instructions for producing a protein that produces type II collagen are provided by this gene. Type II collagen molecule assembly is disrupted by mutations in the COL2A1 gene, impairing the normal development of bones and other connective tissues.

Because achromogenesis type 2 is caused by a mutated gene that only needs one copy in each cell, it is regarded as an autosomal dominant disorder.
