= Spondyloepiphyseal dysplasia congenita =

Spondyloepiphyseal dysplasia
- Specialty: Medical genetics

Spondyloepiphyseal dysplasia congenita (SEDc) is a type of autosomal dominant dwarfism caused by mutations in the COL2A1 gene. Spondyloepiphyseal dysplasia congenita is present in 1 in 100,000 births, though many children are stillborn, premature, or die shortly after birth. This disorder is characterized by delayed ossification, particularly of the spine and the proximal ends of long bones (epiphyses).

== Presentation ==
Phenotypes of spondyloepiphyseal dysplasia congenita vary. Defining features include short stature, with a short spine and neck, a barrel chest, and normal-sized hands and feet. This type of dwarfism is characterized by a normal spinal column length relative to the femur bone. Adult height ranges from 0.9 meters (35 inches) to just over 1.4 meters (55 inches). Curvature of the spine (such as kyphoscoliosis and lordosis) progresses during childhood and can cause problems with breathing. Changes in the spinal bones (vertebrae) in the neck may also increase the risk of spinal cord damage. Other skeletal signs include flattened vertebrae (platyspondyly), a hip joint deformity in which the upper leg bones turn inward (coxa vara), and an inward- and downward-turning foot (called clubfoot). Decreased joint mobility and arthritis often develop early in life. Medical texts often state a mild and variable change to facial features, including cheekbones close to the nose appearing flattened, although this appears to be unfounded. Some infants are born with a cleft palate. Severe nearsightedness (high myopia) is sometimes present, as are other eye problems that can affect vision such as detached retinas. About one-quarter of people with this condition have mild to moderate hearing loss.

== Causes ==
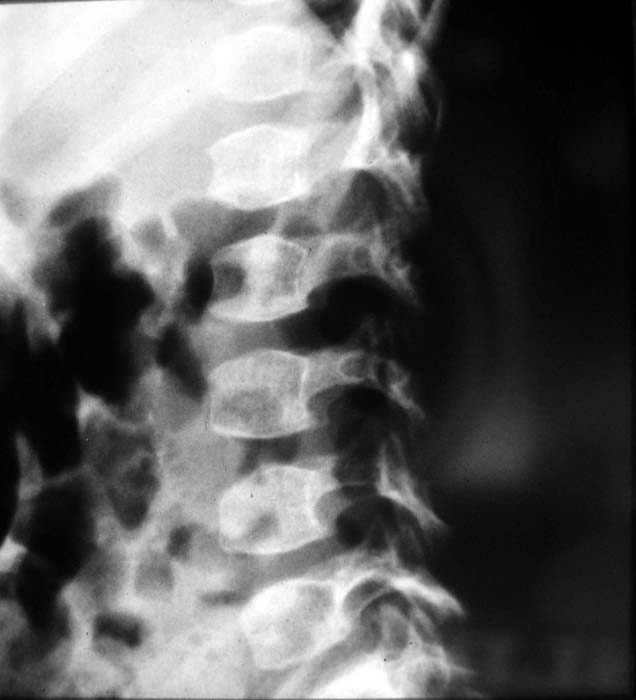
X-ray of the spine in a patient with spondyloepimetaphyseal dysplasia

Spondyloepiphyseal dysplasia congenita is one of a spectrum of skeletal disorders caused by mutations in the COL2A1 gene. The protein made by this gene forms type II collagen, a molecule found mostly in cartilage and in the clear gel that fills the eyeball (the vitreous). Type II collagen is essential for the normal development of bones and other connective tissues. Mutations in the COL2A1 gene interfere with the assembly of type II collagen molecules, which prevents bones from developing properly and causes the signs and symptoms of this condition.

Spondyloepiphyseal dysplasia congenita is inherited in an autosomal dominant pattern, which means one copy of the altered gene is sufficient to cause the disorder.

== Management ==
There is no treatment for the underlying condition. Supportive/symptomatic treatment is based on the traits present in each person with the condition.

== Notable people ==
- Michael Dunn, Oscar- and Tony-nominated American actor, The Wild Wild West, Star Trek
- Warwick Davis, English actor and TV presenter, Willow, Return of the Jedi, Leprechaun film series. His two children also have SED.
- Lenny Rush, English actor, Am I Being Unreasonable?,The Reluctant Vampire
- Natalia Grace, Ukrainian-born American with dwarfism, The Curious Case of Natalia Grace
- Alexander Katan, Dutch Jewish accountant, teacher, and translator who was murdered by the Nazis during the Holocaust, photos of him were notoriously on display in various museums.
