= Type II collagen =

Basis for articular and hyaline cartilage in animals

collagen, type II, alpha 1 (primary osteoarthritis, spondyloepiphyseal dysplasia, congenital)

Identifiers
- Symbol: COL2A1
- Alt. symbols: SEDC
- NCBI gene: 1280
- HGNC: 2200
- OMIM: 120140
- RefSeq: NM_001844
- UniProt: P02458

Other data
- Locus: Chr. 12 q13.11-q13.2
Search for
- Structures: Swiss-model
- Domains: InterPro

Type II collagen is the basis for hyaline cartilage, including the articular cartilages at joint surfaces. It is formed by homotrimers of collagen, type II, alpha 1 chains.

It makes up 50% of all protein in cartilage and 85–90% of collagen of articular cartilage.

Type II collagen is organised into fibrils. This fibrillar network of collagen allows the cartilage to entrap the proteoglycan aggregate, as well as providing tensile strength to the tissue. Oral administration of native type II collagen induces oral tolerance to pathological immune responses and the administration of type II collagen tablets together with paracetamol might be more effective at reducing symptoms of osteoarthritis than paracetamol by itself.

== See also ==
- Type I collagen
- Collagen, type III, alpha 1
