= Congenital vertebral anomaly =

Congenital anomalies of spine
- Specialty: Medical genetics, orthopedics

Congenital vertebral anomalies are a collection of malformations of the spine. Most, around 85%, are not clinically significant, but they can cause compression of the spinal cord by deforming the vertebral canal or causing instability. This condition occurs in the womb. Congenital vertebral anomalies include alterations of the shape and number of vertebrae.

== Lumbarization and sacralization ==
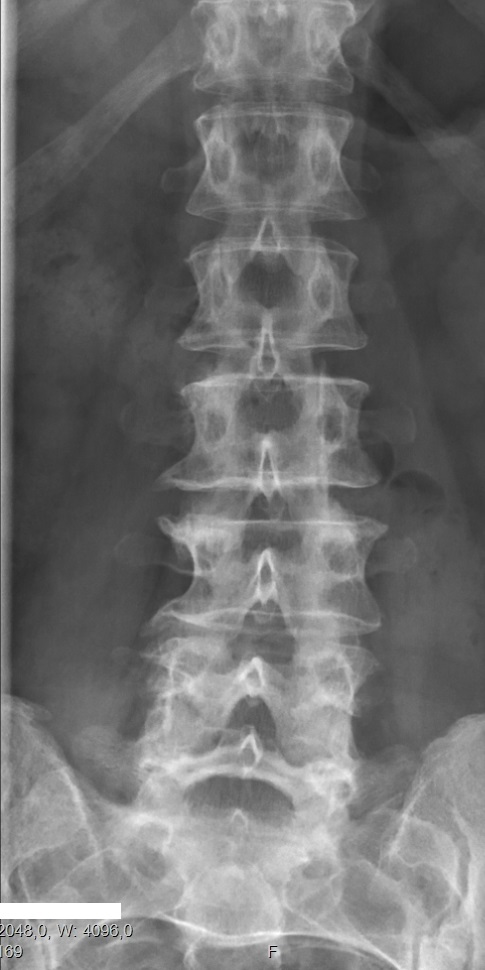
Lumbarization of sacral vertebra 1, seen as 6 vertebrae that do not connect to ribs.

Lumbarization is an anomaly in the spine. It is defined by the nonfusion of the first and second segments of the sacrum. The lumbar spine subsequently appears to have six vertebrae or segments, not five. This sixth lumbar vertebra is known as a transitional vertebra. Conversely the sacrum appears to have only four segments instead of its designated five segments. Lumbosacral transitional vertebrae consist of the process of the last lumbar vertebra fusing with the first sacral segment. While only around 10 percent of adults have a spinal abnormality due to genetics, a sixth lumbar vertebra is one of the more common abnormalities.

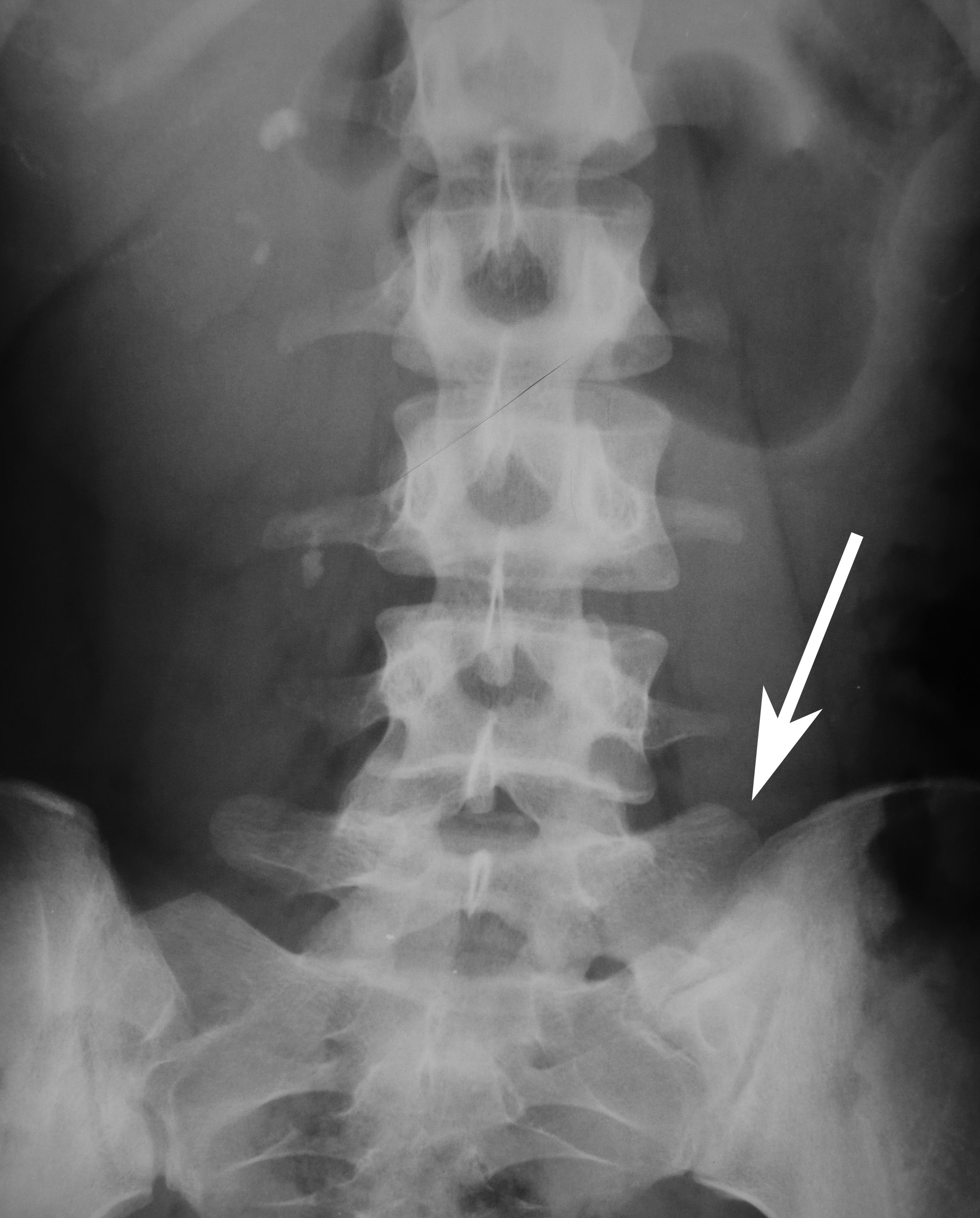
Sacralization of the L5 vertebra is seen at the lower right of the image.

Sacralization of the fifth lumbar vertebra (or sacralization) is a congenital anomaly, in which the transverse process of the last lumbar vertebra (L5) fuses to the sacrum on one side or both, or to ilium, or both. These anomalies are observed in about 3.5 percent of people, and it is usually bilateral but can be unilateral or incomplete (ipsilateral or contralateral rudimentary facets) as well. Although sacralization may be a cause of low back pain, it is asymptomatic in many cases (especially bilateral type). Low back pain in these cases most likely occurs due to biomechanics. In sacralization, the L5-S1 intervertebral disc may be thin and narrow. This abnormality is found by X-ray.

Sacralization of L6 means L6 attaches to S1 via a rudimentary joint. This L6-S1 joint creates additional motion, increasing the potential for motion-related stress and lower back pain/conditions. This condition can usually be treated without surgery, injecting steroid medication at the pseudoarticulation instead. Additionally, if L6 fuses to another vertebra this is increasingly likely to cause lower back pain. The presence of a sixth vertebra in the space where five vertebrae normally reside also decreases the flexibility of the spine and increases the likelihood of injury.

== Hemivertebrae ==
Hemivertebrae are wedge-shaped vertebrae and therefore can cause an angle in the spine (such as kyphosis, scoliosis, and lordosis). Among the congenital vertebral anomalies, hemivertebrae are the most likely to cause neurologic problems. The most common location is the midthoracic vertebrae, especially the eighth (T8). Neurologic signs result from severe angulation of the spine, narrowing of the spinal canal, instability of the spine, and luxation or fracture of the vertebrae. Signs include rear limb weakness or paralysis, urinary or fecal incontinence, and spinal pain. Most cases of hemivertebrae have no or mild symptoms, so treatment is usually conservative. Severe cases may respond to surgical spinal cord decompression and vertebral stabilization.

Recognised associations are many and include: Aicardi syndrome, cleidocranial dysostosis, gastroschisis 3, Gorlin syndrome, fetal pyelectasis 3, Jarcho-Levin syndrome, OEIS complex, VACTERL association.

The probable cause of hemivertebrae is a lack of blood supply causing part of the vertebrae not to form. Hemivertebrae in dogs are most common in the tail, resulting in a screw shape.

== Block vertebrae ==
Block vertebrae occur when there is improper segmentation of the vertebrae, leading to parts of or the entire vertebrae being fused. The adjacent vertebrae fuse through their intervertebral discs and also through other intervertebral joints so that it can lead to blocking or stretching of the exiting nerve roots from that segment. It may lead to certain neurological problems depending on the severity of the block. It can increase stress on the inferior and the superior intervertebral joints. It can lead to an abnormal angle in the spine, there are certain syndromes associated with block vertebrae; for example, Klippel–Feil syndrome. The sacrum is a normal block vertebra.

=== Fossil record ===
Evidence for block vertebrae found in the fossil record is studied by paleopathologists, specialists in ancient disease and injury. A block vertebra has been documented in T. rex. This suggests that the basic development pattern of vertebrae goes at least as far back as the most recent common ancestor of archosaurs and mammals. The tyrannosaur's block vertebra was probably caused by a "failure of the resegmentation of the sclerotomes".

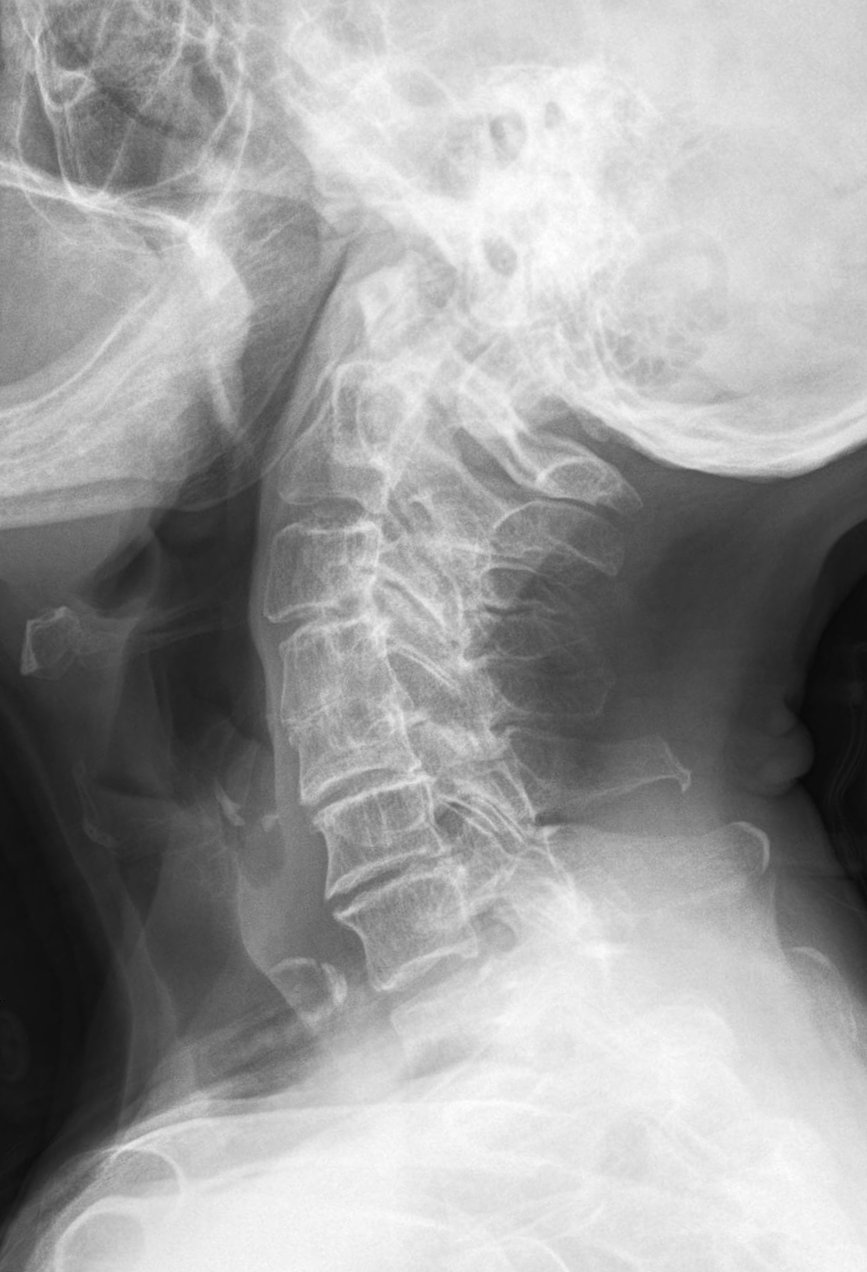
Block vertebrae of the cervical spine (vertebrae 4 and 5). Probably based on degenerative or inflammatory changes.

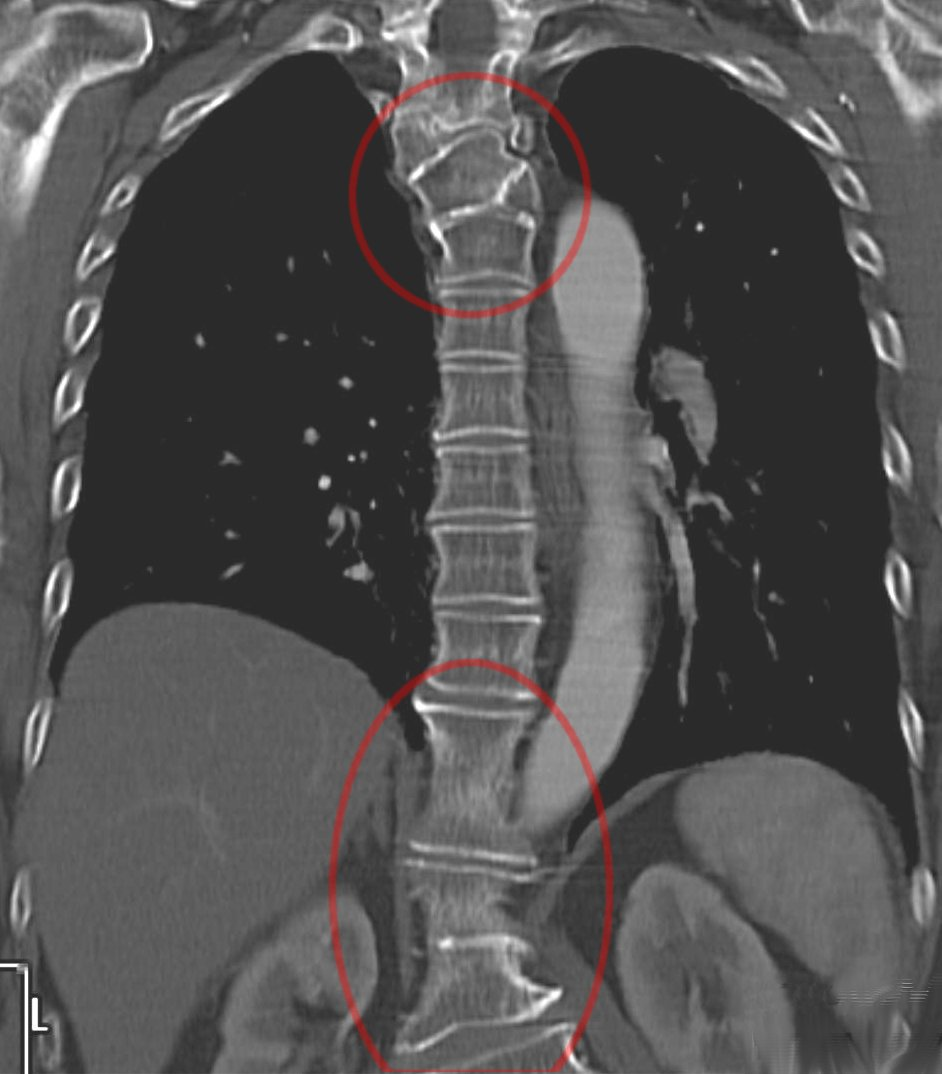
Several congenital block vertebrae in the transition from the thoracic to the lumbar spine and hemivertebrae.

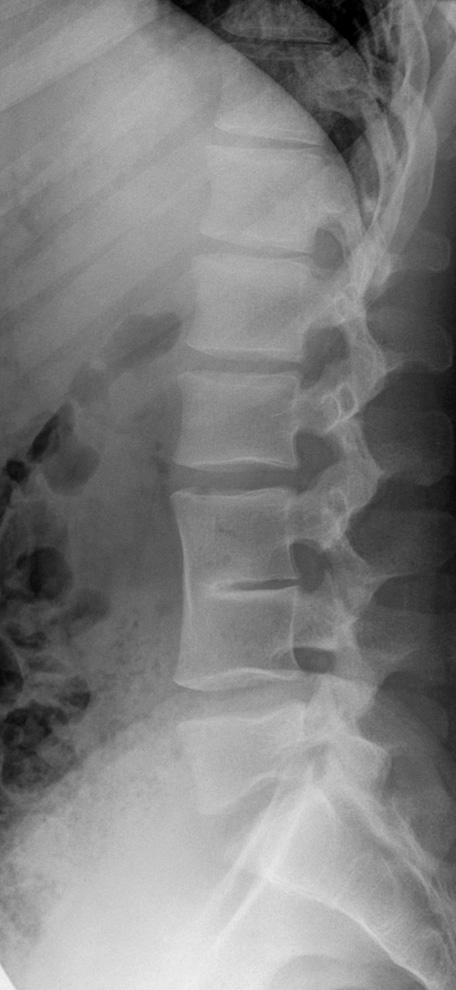
Congenital block vertebra in the lumbar spine (partial vertebrae 3 and 4). The rear portion of the disc still exists.

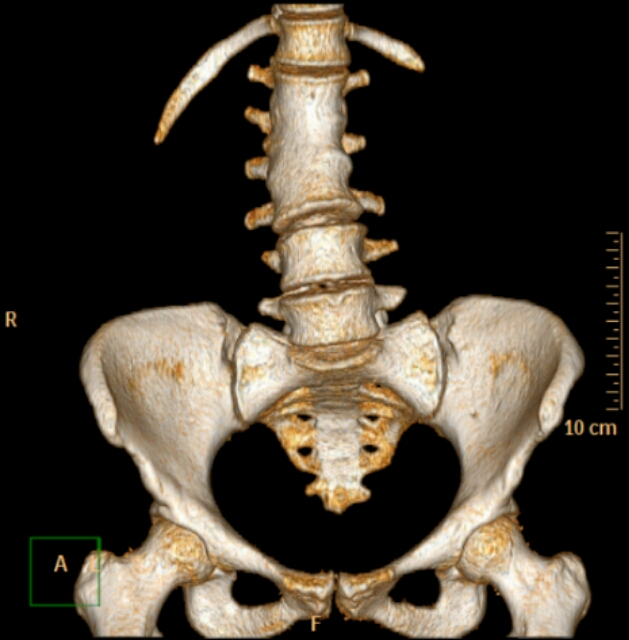
Congenital block vertebra of the lumbar spine. CT volume rendering.

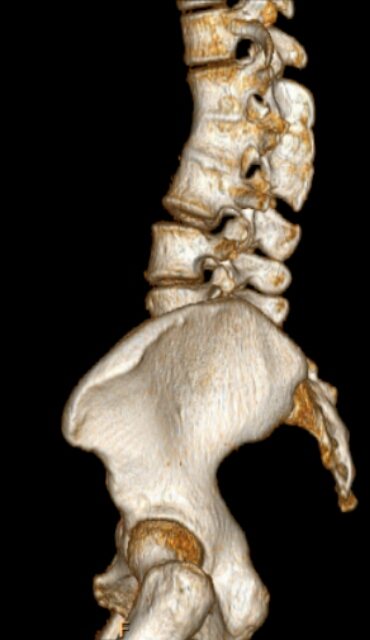
Congenital block vertebra of the lumbar spine. CT volume rendering.

== Butterfly vertebrae ==
Butterfly vertebrae have a sagittal cleft through the body of the vertebrae and a funnel shape at the ends. This gives the appearance of a butterfly on an x-ray. It is caused by persistence of the notochord (which usually only remains as the center of the intervertebral disc) during vertebrae formation. There are usually no symptoms. There are also coronal clefts mainly in skeletal dysplasias such as chondrodysplasia punctata. In dogs, butterfly vertebrae occur most often in Bulldogs, Pugs, and Boston Terriers.

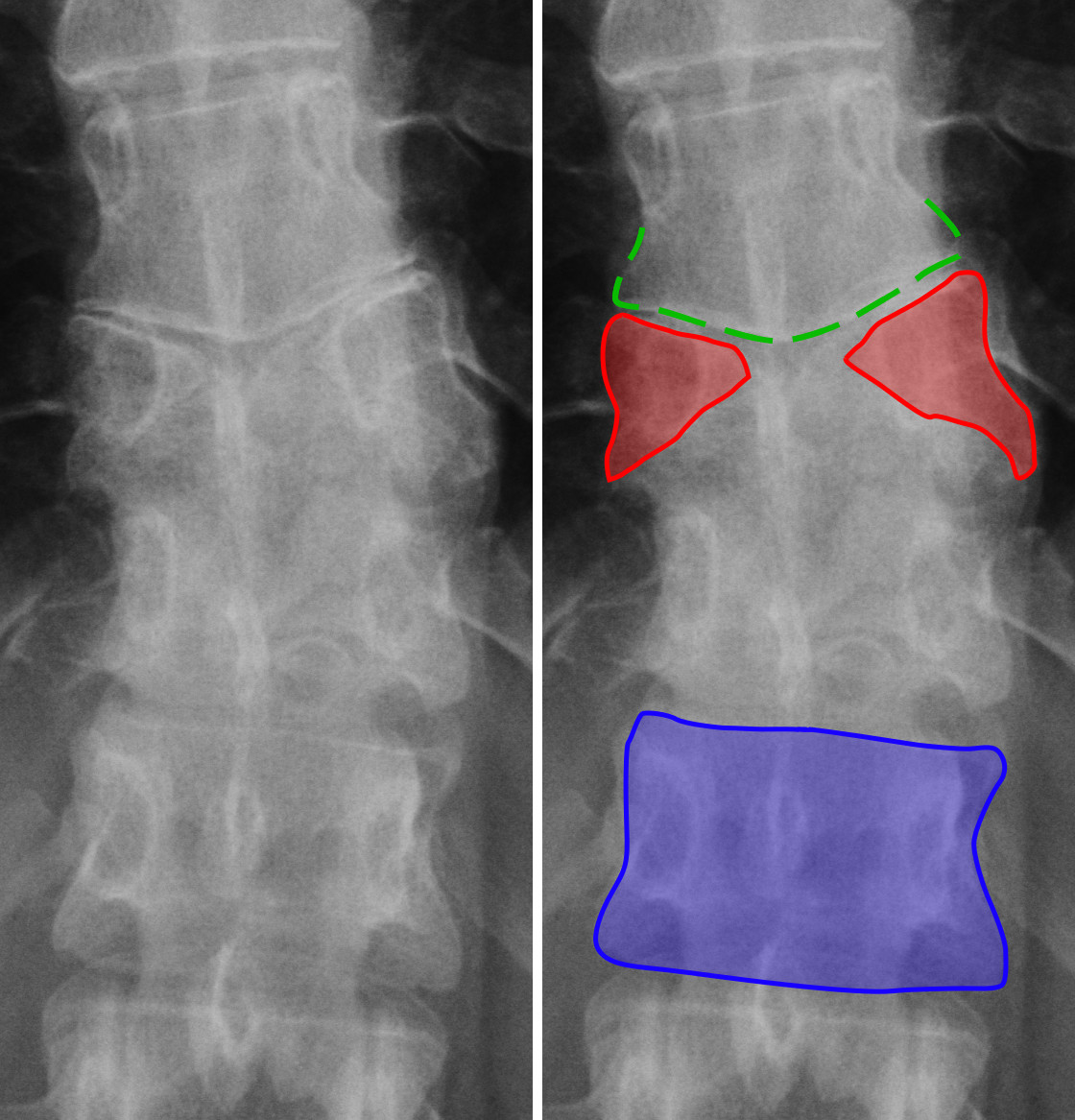
Butterfly vertebra (red). Normal vertebra for comparison (blue).

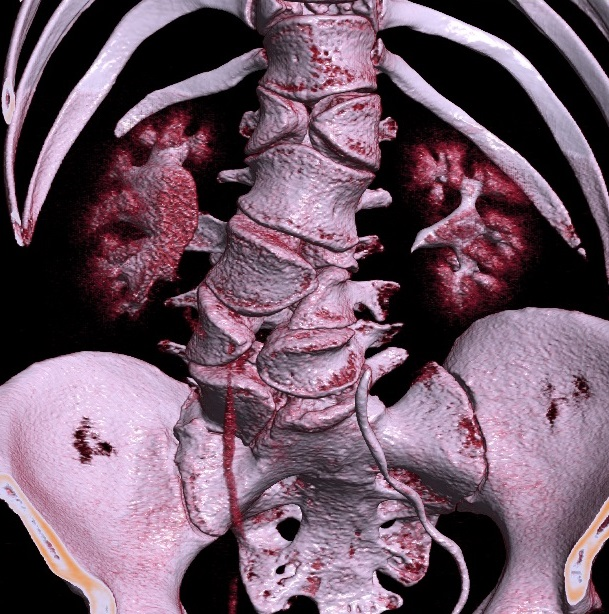
Volume rendering of a CT scan of the lumbar vertebral column, showing butterfly vertebrae at several levels, most typically in L1.

== Transitional vertebrae ==
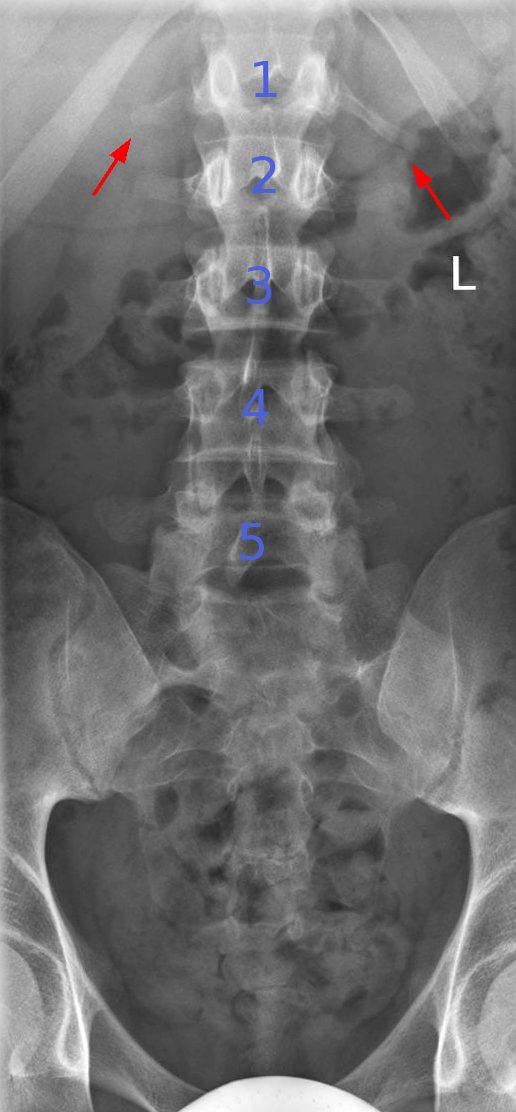
Short ribs at the first lumbar vertebra, which is thus a transitional vertebra, since lumbar vertebrae normally do not have ribs attached to them.

Transitional vertebrae have the characteristics of two types of vertebra. The condition usually involves the vertebral arch or transverse processes. It occurs at the cervicothoracic, thoracolumbar, or lumbosacral junction. For instance, the transverse process of the last cervical vertebra may resemble a rib. A transitional vertebra at the lumbosacral junction can cause arthritis, disk changes, or thecal sac compression. Back pain associated with lumbosacral transitional vertebrae (LSTV) is known as Bertolotti's syndrome. One study found that male German Shepherd Dogs with a lumbosacral transitional vertebra are at greater risk for cauda equina syndrome, which can cause rear limb weakness and incontinence.

The significance of transitional vertebrae has been questioned by one study finding similar prevalence in the general population as those with low back pain, but more recent study found a large difference.

== Spina bifida ==
Spina bifida is characterized by a midline cleft in the vertebral arch. It usually causes no symptoms in dogs. It is seen most commonly in Bulldogs and Manx cats. In Manx it accompanies a condition known as sacrocaudal dysgenesis that gives these cats their characteristic tailless or stumpy tail appearance. It is inherited in Manx as an autosomal dominant trait.

== Associations ==
Vertebral anomalies is associated with an increased incidence of some other specific anomalies as well, together being called the VACTERL association:

- V – Vertebral anomalies
- A – Anal atresia
- C – Cardiovascular anomalies
- T – Tracheoesophageal fistula
- E – Esophageal atresia
- R – Renal (kidney) and/or radial anomalies
- L – Limb defects
