= Microtia =

Birth defect that affects the ears

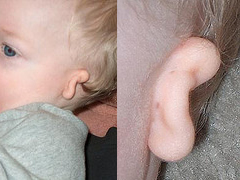
- Unilateral grade III microtia (more often affecting the right ear).
- Specialty: Medical genetics

Microtia is a congenital deformity where the auricle (external ear) is underdeveloped. A completely undeveloped auricle is referred to as anotia. Because microtia and anotia have the same origin, it can be referred to as microtia-anotia. Microtia can be unilateral (one side only) or bilateral (affecting both sides). Microtia occurs in 1 out of about 8,000–10,000 births. In unilateral microtia, the right ear is most commonly affected. It may occur as a complication of taking Accutane (isotretinoin) during pregnancy.

== Classification ==
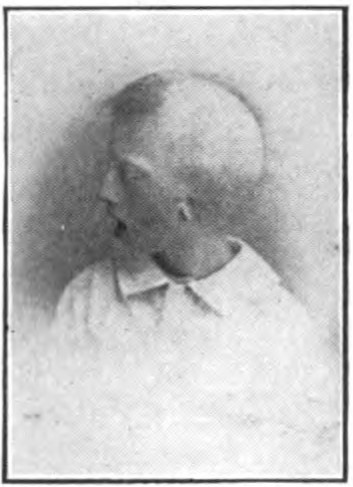
Bilateral grade III microtia in a 9-year-old boy

According to the Altman-classification, there are four grades of microtia:

- Grade I: A less than complete development of the external ear with identifiable structures and a small but present external ear canal.
- Grade II: A partially developed ear (usually the top portion is underdeveloped) with a closed stenotic external ear canal producing a conductive hearing loss.
- Grade III: Absence of the external ear with a small peanut-like vestige structure and an absence of the external ear canal and ear drum. Grade III microtia is the most common form of microtia.
- Grade IV: Absence of the total ear or anotia.

== Causes and risk factors ==
The etiology of microtia in children remains uncertain but there are some cases that associate the cause of microtia with genetic defects in multiple or single genes, altitude, and gestational diabetes. Risk factors gathered from studies include infants born underweight, male sex, women gravidity and parity, and medication use while pregnant. Genetic inheritance has not been fully studied but in the few studies available, it has shown to occur during the early stages of pregnancy.

Microtia is also feature of many conditions and syndromes:

- 46,XY sex reversal 4
- Alpha thalassemia-X-linked intellectual disability syndrome
- Autosomal recessive faciodigitogenital syndrome
- Autosomal recessive spondylometaphyseal dysplasia, Megarbane type
- Bartsocas-Papas syndrome 1
- Bilateral microtia-deafness-cleft palate syndrome
- Blepharophimosis - intellectual disability syndrome, MKB type
- Blepharophimosis - intellectual disability syndrome, Ohdo type
- Branchial arch abnormalities, choanal atresia, athelia, hearing loss, and hypothyroidism syndrome
- Branchiooculofacial syndrome
- Branchiootorenal syndrome 1
- CHARGE association
- Chromosome 1p36 deletion syndrome
- COG1 congenital disorder of glycosylation
- Complete trisomy 21 syndrome
- Diamond-Blackfan anemia 10
- Diamond-Blackfan anemia 14 with mandibulofacial dysostosis
- Diamond-Blackfan anemia 15 with mandibulofacial dysostosis
- Dilated cardiomyopathy-hypergonadotropic hypogonadism syndrome
- Ectrodactyly, ectodermal dysplasia, and cleft lip-palate syndrome 1 and 3
- Epidermolysis bullosa simplex 5C, with pyloric atresia
- Epidermolysis bullosa, junctional 6, with pyloric atresia
- Fanconi anemia complementation group F
- Fanconi anemia complementation group L
- Fine-Lubinsky syndrome
- Gaucher disease perinatal lethal

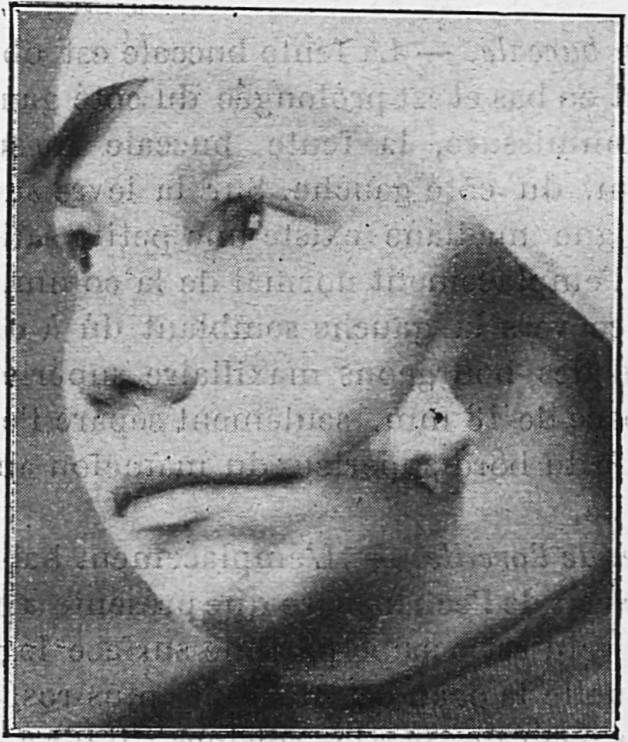
Microtia in a 10-year-old girl with Goldenhar syndrome.

- Goldenhar syndrome
- Hemifacial atrophy
- Hennekam lymphangiectasia-lymphedema syndrome 2
- Holoprosencephaly 12 with or without pancreatic agenesis
- Holoprosencephaly 13, X-linked
- Hypertelorism, microtia, facial clefting syndrome
- Intellectual developmental disorder with dysmorphic facies and behavioral abnormalities
- Intellectual developmental disorder with macrocephaly, seizures, and speech delay
- Intellectual disability, autosomal dominant 1, 43, and 53
- Intrauterine growth restriction, metaphyseal dysplasia, adrenal hypoplasia congenita, genital anomalies, and immunodeficiency
- Isotretinoin-like syndrome
- Larsen-like syndrome, B3GAT3 type
- Mandibulofacial dysostosis with alopecia
- Mandibulofacial dysostosis-macroblepharon-macrostomia syndrome
- Mandibulofacial dysostosis-microcephaly syndrome
- Meier-Gorlin syndrome
- Methylmalonic aciduria and homocystinuria type cblF
- Microcephalic osteodysplastic primordial dwarfism type II
- Microcephaly 6, primary, autosomal recessive
- Microtia-Anotia
- Microtia-eye coloboma-imperforation of the nasolacrimal duct syndrome
- Mitochondrial complex 3 deficiency, nuclear type 11
- Myhre syndrome
- Neurodevelopmental disorder with relative macrocephaly and with or without cardiac or endocrine anomalies
- Neurodevelopmental disorder with spasticity and poor growth
- Neurodevelopmental disorder with speech impairment and dysmorphic facies
- Neurodevelopmental disorder-craniofacial dysmorphism-cardiac defect-hip dysplasia syndrome due to a point mutation
- Oculoauriculovertebral spectrum with radial defects
- Osteodysplastic primordial dwarfism, type 1
- Osteopathia striata with cranial sclerosis
- Pallister-Hall syndrome
- Parietal foramina with cleidocranial dysplasia
- Paternal uniparental disomy of chromosome 14
- Periventricular nodular heterotopia 9
- Phocomelia-ectrodactyly-deafness-sinus arrhythmia syndrome
- Primordial dwarfism-immunodeficiency-lipodystrophy syndrome
- Progressive spondyloepimetaphyseal dysplasia-short stature-short fourth metatarsals-intellectual disability syndrome

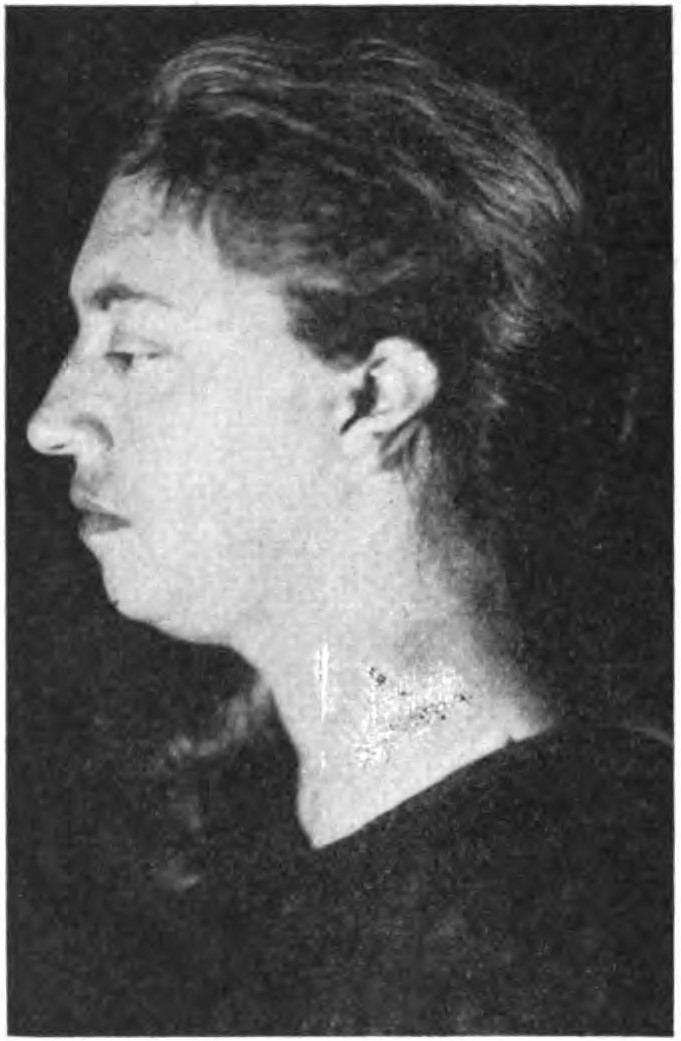
Microtia in a 50-year-old woman with Saethre-Chotzen syndrome

- Saethre-Chotzen syndrome
- Scalp-ear-nipple syndrome
- Seckel syndrome 7
- Short stature and Facioauriculothoracic malformations
- Short ulna-dysmorphism-hypotonia-intellectual disability syndrome
- Skin creases, congenital symmetric circumferential, 2
- Spondyloepiphyseal dysplasia with congenital joint dislocations
- Spondyloepiphyseal dysplasia, Cantu type
- Townes-Brocks syndrome 1 and 2
- Treacher Collins syndrome 1 to 3
- Trichohepatoenteric syndrome 1
- Triglyceride storage disease with ichthyosis
- X-linked intellectual disability, van Esch type
- Yunis-Varon syndrome

== Diagnosis ==
At birth, lower grade microtia is difficult to visually diagnose with a physical exam. While higher grade microtia can be visually diagnosed due to noticeable abnormalities. Infants that have noticeable abnormalities are closely monitored by physicians and hearing specialists.

== Treatment ==
The goal of medical intervention is to provide the best form and function to the underdeveloped ear.

=== Hearing ===
Typically, testing is first done to determine the quality of hearing. This can be done as early as in the first two weeks with a BAER test (Brain Stem Auditory Response Test). At age 5–6, CT or CAT scans of the middle ear can be done to elucidate its development and clarify which patients are appropriate candidates for surgery to improve hearing. For younger individuals, this is done under sedation.

The hearing loss associated with congenital aural atresia is a conductive hearing loss—hearing loss caused by inefficient conduction of sound to the inner ear. Essentially, children with aural atresia have hearing loss because the sound cannot travel into the (usually) healthy inner ear—there is no ear canal, no eardrum, and the small ear bones (malleus/hammer, incus/anvil, and stapes/stirrup) are underdeveloped. "Usually" is in parentheses because rarely, a child with atresia also has a malformation of the inner ear leading to a sensorineural hearing loss (as many as 19% in one study). Sensorineural hearing loss is caused by a problem in the inner ear, the cochlea. Sensorineural hearing loss is not correctable by surgery, but properly fitted and adjusted hearing amplification (hearing aids) generally provide excellent rehabilitation for this hearing loss. If the hearing loss is severe to profound in both ears, the child may be a candidate for a cochlear implant (beyond the scope of this discussion).

Unilateral sensorineural hearing loss was not generally considered a serious disability by the medical establishment before the nineties; it was thought that the afflicted person was able to adjust to it from birth. In general, there are exceptional advantages to gain from an intervention to enable hearing in the microtic ear, especially in bilateral microtia. Children with untreated unilateral sensorineural hearing loss are more likely to have to repeat a grade in school and/or need supplemental services (e.g., FM system – see below) than their peers.

Children with unilateral sensorineural hearing loss often require years of speech therapy in order to learn how to enunciate and understand spoken language. What is truly unclear, and the subject of an ongoing research study, is the effect of unilateral conductive hearing loss (in children with unilateral aural atresia) on scholastic performance. If atresia surgery or some form of amplification is not used, special steps should be taken to ensure that the child is accessing and understanding all of the verbal information presented in school settings. Recommendations for improving a child's hearing in the academic setting include preferential seating in class, an FM system (the teacher wears a microphone, and the sound is transmitted to a speaker at the child's desk or to an ear bud or hearing aid the child wears), a bone-anchored hearing aid (BAHA), or conventional hearing aids. Age for BAHA implantation depends on whether the child is in Europe (18 months) or the US (age 5). Until then it is possible to fit a BAHA on a softband

Not all children with aural atresia are candidates for atresia repair. Candidacy for atresia surgery is based on the hearing test (audiogram) and CT scan imaging. If a canal is built where one does not exist, minor complications can arise from the body's natural tendency to heal an open wound closed. Repairing aural atresia is a very detailed and complicated surgical procedure which requires an expert in atresia repair. While complications from this surgery can arise, the risk of complications is greatly reduced when using a highly experienced otologist. Atresia patients who opt for surgery will temporarily have the canal packed with gelatin sponge and silicone sheeting to prevent closure. The timing of ear canal reconstruction (canalplasty) depends on the type of external ear (Microtia) repair desired by the patient and family. Two surgical teams in the USA are currently able to reconstruct the canal at the same time as the external ear in a single surgical stage (one stage ear reconstruction).

In cases where a later surgical reconstruction of the external ear of the child might be possible, positioning of the BAHA implant is critical. It may be necessary to position the implant further back than usual to enable successful reconstructive surgery – but not so far as to compromise hearing performance. If the reconstruction is ultimately successful, it is easy to remove the percutaneous BAHA abutment. If the surgery is unsuccessful, the abutment can be replaced and the implant re-activated to restore hearing.

=== External ear ===
The age when outer ear surgery can be attempted depends upon the technique chosen. The earliest is 7 for Rib Cartilage Grafts. However, some surgeons recommend waiting until a later age, such as 8–10 when the ear is closer to adult size. External ear prostheses have been made for children as young as 5.

For auricular reconstruction, there are several different options:

1. Rib Cartilage Graft Reconstruction: This surgery may be performed by specialists in the technique. It involves sculpting the patient's own rib cartilage into the form of an ear. Because the cartilage is the patient's own living tissue, the reconstructed ear continues to grow as the child does. In order to be sure that the rib cage is large enough to provide the necessary donor tissue, some surgeons wait until the patient is 8 years of age; however, some surgeons with more experience with this technique may begin the surgery on a child aged six. The major advantage of this surgery is that the patient's own tissue is used for the reconstruction. This surgery varies from two to four stages depending on the surgeon's preferred method. A novel one stage ear reconstruction technique is performed by a few select surgeons. One team is able to reconstruct the entire external ear and ear canal in one operation.
2. Reconstruct the ear using a polyethylene plastic implant (also called Medpor): This is a 1–2 stage surgery that can start at age 3 and can be done as an outpatient without hospitalization. Using the porous framework, which allows the patient's tissue to grow into the material and the patient's own tissue flap, a new ear is constructed in a single surgery. A small second surgery is performed in 3–6 months if needed for minor adjustments. Medpor was developed by John Reinisch. This surgery should only be performed by experts in the techniques involved. The use of porous polyethylene implants for ear reconstruction was initiated in the 1980s by Alexander Berghaus.
3. Ear Prosthesis: An auricular (ear) prosthesis is custom made by an anaplastologist to mirror the other ear. Prosthetic ears can appear very realistic. They require a few minutes of daily care. They are typically made of silicone, which is colored to match the surrounding skin and can be attached using either adhesive or with titanium screws inserted into the skull to which the prosthetic is attached with a magnetic or bar/clip type system. These screws are the same as the BAHA (bone anchored hearing aid) screws and can be placed simultaneously. The biggest advantage over any surgery is having a prosthetic ear that allows the affected ear to appear as normal as possible to the natural ear. The biggest disadvantage is the daily care involved and knowing that the prosthesis is not real. In 2022, success of transplantation of a 3D bioprinted auricle made from the microtia patient's own cells was reported, also achieving a first in 3D bioprinting for transplants.

==== Related conditions ====
Aural atresia is the underdevelopment of the middle ear and canal and usually occurs in conjunction with microtia. Atresia occurs because patients with microtia may not have an external opening to the ear canal, though. However, the cochlea and other inner ear structures are usually present. The grade of microtia usually correlates to the degree of development of the middle ear. Microtia is usually isolated, but may occur in conjunction with hemifacial microsomia, Goldenhar Syndrome or Treacher-Collins Syndrome. It is also occasionally associated with kidney abnormalities (rarely life-threatening), and jaw problems, and more rarely, heart defects and vertebral deformities.

== Notable cases ==
- Paul Stanley, vocalist and rhythm guitarist of Kiss, was born with grade III microtia of his right ear.
- Gideon Glick, actor, has both microtia and atresia of his right ear.
