= Abruzzo–Erickson syndrome =

- Other names: CHARGE like syndrome X-linked
- Causes: Genetic (X-linked recessive)
- Frequency: Extremely rare
- Named after: Michael Abruzzo; Robert Erickson

Abruzzo–Erickson syndrome is an extremely rare disorder characterized by deafness, protruding ears, coloboma, a cleft palate or palatal rugosity, radial synostosis, and short stature. It was first characterized by Abruzzo and Erickson in 1977 as a CHARGE like syndrome as variably expressed among a family of two brothers, their mother, and their maternal uncle. Members of this family exhibited many of the CHARGE symptoms, but notably did not have choanal atresia and the brothers experienced typical genital development. Due to the recent discovery of this disorder, its etiology is not fully known but it is understood that it arises from mutations on the TBX22 gene on the X-chromosome. The disorder is inherited in an X-linked recessive manner. There is currently no known cure but its symptoms can be treated.

== Signs and symptoms ==
Abruzzo-Erikson syndrome is characterized by cleft palate, coloboma, hypospadias, deafness, short stature, and radial synostosis. There are also additional symptoms that are very similar to CHARGE syndrome such as large and protruding ears, wide spacing between the second and third fingers, ulnar deviation, facial asymmetry, dental abnormalities, and congenital heart malformation. However, in contrast to CHARGE syndrome, patients with Abruzzo-Erikson syndrome do not display intellectual disability, choanal atresia, or genital hypoplasia.

== Genetics ==
While the complete etiology is not fully known, Abruzzo-Erickson Syndrome arises in part due to mutations on the TBX22 gene, a gene that is located on the X-chromosome (around 80,014,753 to 80,031,774 bp), and is inherited in an X-linked recessive manner. The T-box transcription factor TBX22 plays an essential role in normal craniofacial development. Nonsense, frameshift, splice-site and missense mutations in this region can result in patients with X-linked cleft palate (CPX) and ankyloglossia phenotypes. The CPX phenotype observed in individuals with Abruzzo-Erickson Syndrome most likely results from a loss of protein function as severely truncated proteins can result from the introduction of a premature stop codon can result from nonsense, splice-site, or frame shift sequence changes, while missense mutations in this region have less of a structural effect on the protein, but instead interferes with DNA binding and transcriptional activity.

== Diagnosis ==
Abruzzo–Erickson syndrome can be diagnosed on the basis of a complete physical examination (as patients with the syndrome often possess noticeable physical characteristics such as a cleft palate, large protruding ears, and facial asymmetry). As the syndrome is inherited, a complete medical history is also taken, and additional assessments may be made based on the results of laboratory tests, biopsies, and imaging studies. Genetic and molecular tests such as DNA sequencing can also be used for a complete diagnosis of Abruzzo–Erickson syndrome.

== Treatment ==
There is no cure for this condition. However, children with Abruzzo-Erikson syndrome can survive into adulthood and live productive lives as long as they are treated from an early age. Many life-threatening problems may arise in these children which need to be addressed. Treatment is generally focused on addressing the specific symptoms and not the syndrome itself. Since hearing problems are common with this syndrome, it is usually the first issue addressed. Correction of some abnormalities can be corrected with the use of extensive multidisciplinary craniofacial surgery. Physical therapy and occupational therapy are important to ensure they can live a normal and productive life. Monitoring the heart for defects is also common and there are medications to educe this risk or surgery is available to correct some of conditions.

== Epidemiology ==
Abruzzo-Erickson Syndrome is an extremely rare condition, prevalent among less than one in a million of individuals. As of 2021, only four cases have been characterized in literature.

== See also ==
- CHARGE syndrome
