= Treacher Collins =

Treacher Collins may refer to:

- Treacher Collins syndrome, a rare genetic disorder characterised by craniofacial deformities
- Edward Treacher Collins, the surgeon and ophthalmologist after whom the syndrome was named
