= Atresia =

Condition in which a bodily orifice or passage is closed or absent

Atresia is a condition in which an orifice or passage in the body is (usually abnormally) closed or absent.

== Types ==
=== Anotia ===
Anotia is characterized by the complete absence of the ear and is extremely rare. This condition may affect one or both ears, though one missing ear is more common. Anotia is also linked to conductive hearing loss, a condition in which sound waves do not travel well through the ear and sound is not efficiently conducted from the outer ear canal to the eardrum. Anotia has no known cause. An associated syndrome, such as Treacher Collins or Goldenhar syndrome, may affect up to 40% of patients. Anotia is typically diagnosed through a physical examination at birth. Prenatal ultrasounds may help with early detection. Total ear reconstruction is the standard treatment for Anotia.

=== Biliary atresia ===
Biliary atresia (BA) is a rare disease marked by an unknown-origin biliary obstruction that manifests in the neonatal period. The classic clinical triad of Biliary atresia is acholic stools, and dark urine, jaundice, and hepatomegaly. The clinical manifestations are used to make the diagnosis, which is supported by liver ultrasonography, cholangiography, and a liver biopsy. The initial treatment is surgical, with the obliterated extrahepatic bile duct resected and a hepatoportoenterostomy created.

=== Bronchial atresia ===
Bronchial atresia is a rare congenital disease characterized by segmental or lobar emphysema and, in some cases, mucoid impaction. The exact cause of bronchial atresia is unknown; the lobar bronchi, subsegmental bronchi, and distal bronchioles develop in the fifth, sixth, and sixteenth weeks of fetal development, respectively. Bronchial atresia is frequently discovered incidentally because it is asymptomatic. Recurrent pulmonary infections are among the most frequent clinical manifestations in symptomatic patients. Because such benign disease frequently affects young patients, minimally invasive surgery, such as thoracoscopic surgery, is advised.

=== Choanal atresia ===
Choanal atresia (CA) is a rare but well-known condition marked by the anatomical closure of the posterior choanae in the nasal cavity. CA presents clinically in a variety of ways, ranging from acute airway obstruction to chronic recurrent sinusitis, depending on whether it is unilateral, bilateral, or paired with other coexisting airway abnormalities, as is common in individuals who have CHARGE syndrome and craniofacial anomalies. The initial clinical evaluation consists of inserting a six or eight Fr suction catheter through the nostrils, performing a methylene blue dye test, a cotton wisp test, and a laryngeal mirror test. In patients with proper nasal preparation, a CT of the sinuses with 2–5 mm cuts provides a definitive evaluation.

=== Esophageal atresia ===
Esophageal atresia (EA) is a rare congenital malformation characterized by a lack of continuity between the lower and upper esophageal pouches, often associated with tracheoesophageal fistula. Esophageal atresia with or without tracheoesophageal fistula (TEF) is the most common birth defect of the esophagus. The diagnosis of EA usually occurs within the first 24 hours of life, but it can be made antenatally or later. Although environmental effects and genetic factors have been documented, the causes of EA remain largely unknown. Treatment is surgical and includes reconstruction of the continuity of the esophagus or replacement by other organs.

=== Follicular atresia ===
Follicular atresia refers to the process in which a follicle fails to develop, thus preventing it from ovulating and releasing an egg. It is a normal, naturally occurring progression that occurs as mammalian ovaries age. Approximately 1% of mammalian follicles in ovaries undergo ovulation and the remaining 99% of follicles go through follicular atresia as they cycle through the growth phases. In summary, follicular atresia is a process that leads to the follicular loss and loss of oocytes, and any disturbance or loss of functionality of this process can lead to many other conditions.

=== Imperforate anus ===
Imperforate anus is a somewhat common anomaly, with a newborn incidence ranging from 1: 1500 to 1:5000. There have been isolated cases of imperforate anus, but this condition is more commonly found as one among numerous anomalies. Imperforate anus is usually not diagnosed until after birth. There is no need for immediate reconstructive anorectal surgery. However, prompt evaluation is critical, and urgent decompressive surgery may be required.

=== Intestinal atresia ===
With an incidence of 1 in 5,000 newborns, intestinal atresias are one of the most common causes of neonatal intestinal obstruction. The majority of cases are small intestinal atresia, while colonic atresias are uncommon. There have been two main etiologies proposed for intestinal atresia: the first is a lack of re-vacuolization of the solid cord stage of intestinal development, and the second is a late intrauterine mesenteric vascular accident. Prenatal ultrasonography is the most reliable way to diagnose intestinal artesia. Pre-operative management includes primary resuscitation, correction of dehydration, and correction of electrolyte abnormalities. Kimura's diamond-shaped duodeno-duodenostomy is the most common surgical treatment.

=== Microtia ===
Microtia is a congenital deformity where the auricle (external ear) is underdeveloped. A completely undeveloped pinna is referred to as anotia. Because microtia and anotia have the same origin, it can be referred to as microtia-anotia. Microtia can be unilateral (one side only) or bilateral (affecting both sides). Microtia occurs in 1 out of about 8,000–10,000 births. In unilateral microtia, the right ear is most commonly affected. It may occur as a complication of taking Accutane (isotretinoin) during pregnancy.

=== Potter sequence ===
Potter's sequence is a fatal sporadic and autosomal recessive disorder with an incidence of 1 in 4000 births. Babies born with this defect are either stillborn or die very soon after birth. It primarily affects male babies and is associated with severe oligohydramnios, polycystic kidney, bilateral renal agenesis, and obstructive uropathy during the middle gestational weeks. The main defect in Potter's sequence is renal failure. Premature birth, breech presentation, atypical facial appearance, and limb malformations are other distinguishing characteristics. In most infants, severe respiratory insufficiency results in death.

=== Renal agenesis ===
Renal agenesis occurs when the ureteric bud doesn't fuse with the metanephric blastema during embryogenesis, leading to the nephron and, in some cases, the ureter being absent. Unilateral renal agenesis occurs in 1 in 1000 live births, in contrast bilateral renal agenesis occurs in 1 in 3000 to 4000 pregnancies. Unilateral renal agenesis has a very good prognosis, whereas bilateral renal agenesis has a high rate of perinatal mortality and morbidity due to the lack of amniotic fluid, resulting in lethal pulmonary hypoplasia. The diagnosis of renal agenesis is usually made during a midgestation anatomy ultrasound examination. A genetic syndrome or other anomalies are linked to approximately 30% of cases of renal agenesis.

=== Tricuspid atresia ===
Tricuspid atresia is a form of congenital heart disease whereby there is a complete absence of the tricuspid valve. Therefore, there is an absence of right atrioventricular connection. This leads to a hypoplastic (undersized) or absent right ventricle. This defect is contracted during prenatal development, when the heart does not finish developing. It causes the systemic circulation to be filled with relatively deoxygenated blood. The causes of tricuspid atresia are unknown.

=== Vaginal atresia ===
Vaginal atresia is a birth defect that causes uterovaginal outflow tract obstruction. It happens when the urogenital sinus fails to form the caudal portion of the vagina. Fibrous tissue replaces the caudal portion of the vagina. Vaginal atresia is thought to affect one in every 5000-10,000 live female births. The anomaly is frequently undetected until adolescence, when primary amenorrhea or abdominal pain caused by an obstructed uterovaginal tract leads to a diagnostic evaluation.
