= Nager acrofacial dysostosis =

Genetic disorder characterized by deformity of the skull, face, and/or limbs

- Other names: Nager syndrome, mandibulofacial dysostosis with preaxial limb anomalies
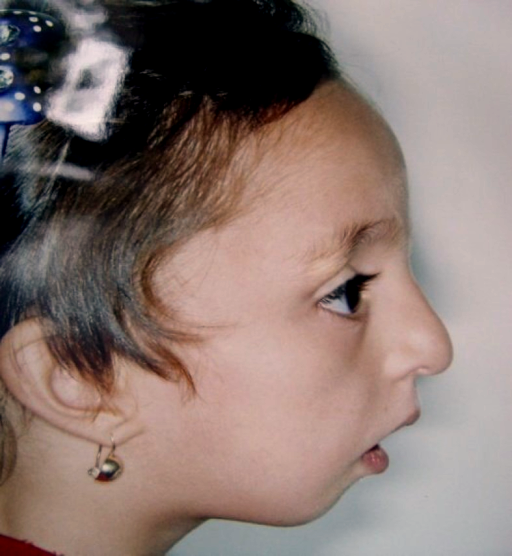

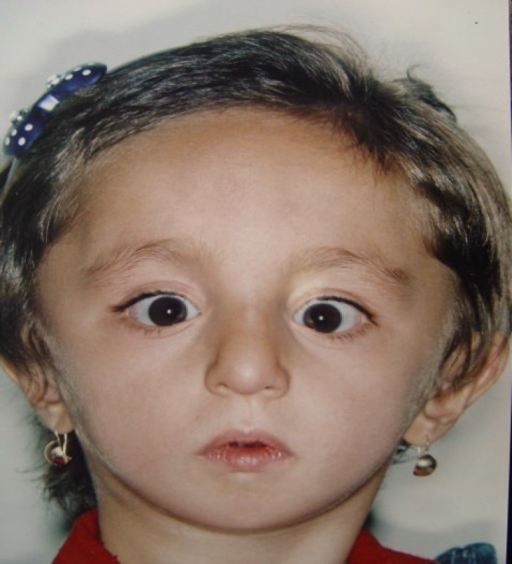
- Photo of child with Nager syndrome, with underdeveloped cheek bones, small and receding jaw, and downslanted palpebral fissures.

Nager acrofacial dysostosis, also known as Nager syndrome, is a genetic disorder which displays several or all of the following characteristics: underdevelopment of the cheek and jaw area, down-sloping of the opening of the eyes, lack or absence of the lower eyelashes, kidney or stomach reflux, hammer toes, shortened soft palate, lack of development of the internal and external ear, possible cleft palate, underdevelopment or absence of the thumb, hearing loss (see hearing loss with craniofacial syndromes) and shortened forearms, as well as poor movement in the elbow, and may be characterized by accessory tragi. Occasionally, affected individuals develop vertebral anomalies such as scoliosis.

The inheritance pattern is autosomal, but there are arguments as to whether it is autosomal dominant or autosomal recessive. Most cases tend to be sporadic. Nager syndrome shares many characteristics with other craniofacial syndromes: Miller, Treacher Collins and Pierre Robin.

== Genetics ==
Nager acrofacial dysostosis is inherited in an autosomal dominant manner.

While Nager syndrome is thought to be most often caused by haploinsufficiency of the spliceosomal factor SF3B4, in over one third of patients tested, the SF3B4 mutation is not found. Genetic sequencing shows that the syndrome can be caused by either autosomal recessive or autosomal dominant inheritance.

== Treatment ==
Due to craniofacial development, it is recommended that families work closely with craniofacial specialists as soon as Nager is recognized or suspected. Children born with Nager may need intubation immediately after birth, requiring tube feeding and a tracheotomy tube to help with breathing. Surgical intervention is commonly necessary to increase mandibular mobility. As the child grows and develops, further surgery is usually required on the lower jaw and is often done in tandem with orthodontic treatments. Further treatment depends upon the symptoms of the individual patient and may include oral surgery, plastic surgery, audiological intervention to manage hearing loss, speech therapy, and surgery on the limbs to aid with mobility limitations.

== See also ==
- Dermoid cyst
