= Miller syndrome =

- Other names: Mandibulfacial dysostosis with postaxial limb anomalies
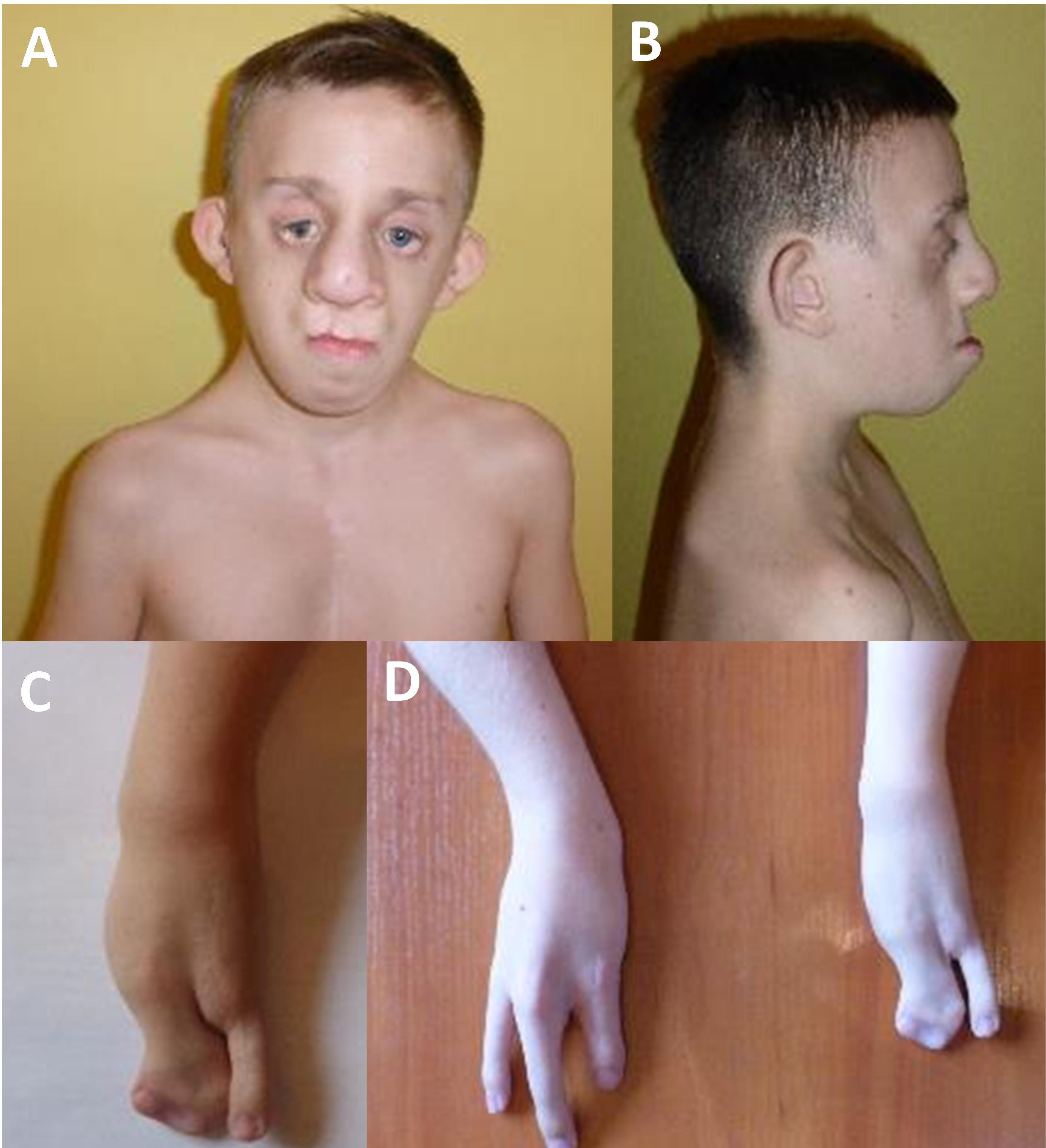
- This photo shows person with Miller syndrome, who has typical facial and limb features of this syndrome, such as severe micrognathia, hypoplasia/aplasia of the postaxial rays of the limbs, cleft lip and palate.

Miller syndrome, also known as Genée–Wiedemann syndrome, Wildervanck–Smith syndrome or postaxial acrofacial dysostosis, is an extremely rare genetic condition that manifests as craniofacial, limb and eye deformities. It is caused by a mutation in the DHODH gene. The incidence of the condition is not known, and little is known about its pathogenesis.

== Presentation ==
The syndrome consists of severe micrognathia, cleft lip and/or palate, hypoplasia or aplasia of the postaxial elements of the limbs, coloboma of the eyelids and supernumerary nipples. Other characteristics of the syndrome include palpebral fissures that slant downward, malar hypoplasia, malformed ears, and a broad nasal ridge. Other features include supernumerary vertebrae and other vertebral segmentation and rib defects, heart defects (patent ductus arteriosus, ventricular septal defect and ostium primum atrial septal defect), lung disease from chronic infection, single umbilical artery, absence of the hemidiaphragm, hypoplasia of the femora, ossification defects of the ischium and pubis, bilobed tongue, lung hypoplasia, and renal reflux.

== Cause ==
The gene responsible for this disorder is DHODH located at chromosome 16q22. This gene encodes an enzyme, dihydroorotate dehydrogenase, which catalyses the ubiquinone-mediated oxidation of dihydroorotate to orotate, the fourth enzymatic step in de novo pyrimidine biosynthesis. The protein is normally located on the outer surface of the inner mitochondrial membrane.

== Genetics ==
A mutation in this gene was reported by Morgan in 1910 in the fruit fly Drosophila melanogaster. In the fly, this mutation is characterized by wing anomalies, defective oogenesis, and malformed posterior legs. In humans, Miller syndrome is due to a recessive mutation in the DHODH gene.

== Diagnosis ==
=== Differential diagnosis ===
The differential diagnosis includes Treacher Collins syndrome and Nager acrofacial dysostosis (preaxial cranial dysostosis). Other types of axial cranial dysostosis included the Kelly, Reynolds, Arens (Tel Aviv), Rodríguez (Madrid), Richieri-Costa and Patterson-Stevenson-Fontaine forms.

== History ==
This condition was first described in 1969 by Genée, who assumed the condition to be an extreme form of Treacher Collins syndrome (dysostosis mandibulofacialis). Wiedemann in 1975 described it as a separate entity. Further cases were reported by Wildervanck in 1975 and by Miller et al in 1979 The syndrome was named Genée-Wiedemann syndrome in 1986. A family harboring Miller syndrome was the first human family to be ever sequenced with whole-genome sequencing.

== Eponym ==
Genée–Wiedemann syndrome is named after two German physicians: Ekkart Genée (1936–), and his mentor Hans-Rudolf Wiedemann (1915–2006).
