= Anotia =

Congenital absence of one or both ears

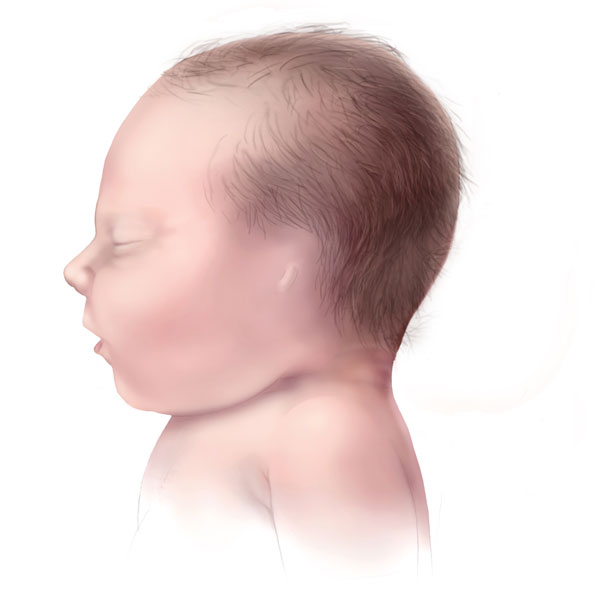
- Illustration of anotia
- Specialty: Medical genetics

Anotia ("no ear") describes a rare congenital deformity that involves the complete absence of the auricle, the outer projected portion of the ear, and narrowing or absence of the ear canal. This contrasts with microtia, in which a small part of the auricle is present. Anotia and microtia may occur unilaterally (only one ear affected) or bilaterally (both ears affected). This deformity results in conductive hearing loss and therefore deafness.

== Ear development ==
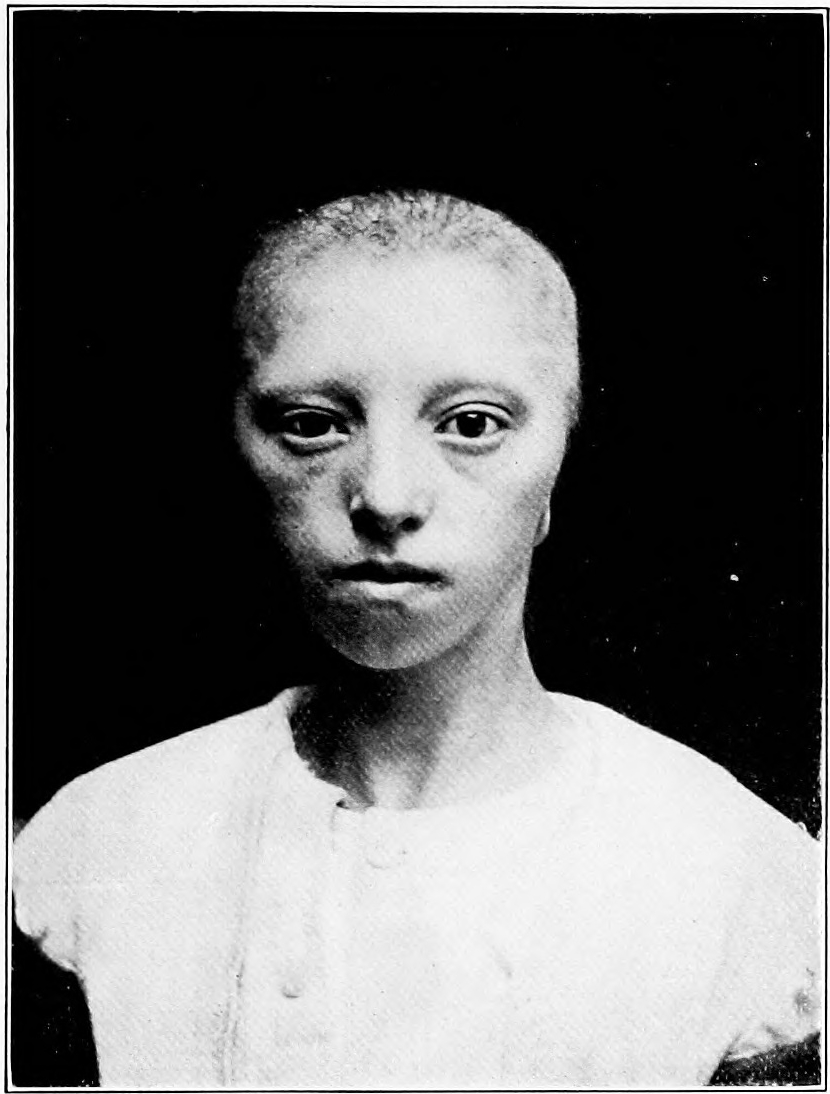
Bilateral anotia in a 10-year-old boy, 1904

Ear development begins in about the third week of human embryonic development, beginning with the formation of the otic placodes, an extension of the early hind brain. By the fourth week of development, the otic placodes invaginate, or sink inward forming pits which close themselves off for the outer surface ectoderm and begin forming the inner ear labyrinthe on the inside. Outer ear development begins in about the fifth week of human embryonic development. Upon the pharyngeal arches, auricle hillocks begin to form. By the seventh week, the three pairs of hillocks have enlarged differentiated and fused together to start forming the auricle, or outer portion of the ear. Throughout fetal development, the hillocks will move from the sides of the neck to the sides of the head. Simultaneously, in the seventh week of development, the auditory tube begins to form out of the tympanic membrane.

=== Processing sound ===
The human ear is divided into three sections. Each section has its own specialized function.

1. The outer ear acts like a funnel and takes in the sound.
2. The middle ear holds the tympanic membrane, or ear drum and several little bones that are moved by the sound waves that have entered the ear via the canal. These movements are very small, like vibrations and are transmitted to the inner ear.
3. The inner ear contains a structure called the cochlea, which contains small hair- like cells that respond to sound information and transmits it via nerve impulses down the auditory nerve and to the brain, where they are processed.

=== Defects of the ear: anotia/microtia ===
The isolated cause, a cause not associated with a syndrome, of anotia or microtia is not known, though it is believed to be of genetic basis. Developmentally, anotia/microtia occurs when certain tissues associated with the auricle do not develop. This rare defect may occur as part of a syndrome or as an isolated abnormality.

Type I: External portion of the ear is small in size; auricle structure is normal

Type II: The auricle is in a hook or 'S' shape; external ear is only moderately abnormal.

Type III: Small amount of basic, soft tissue ear structure lacking cartilage; auricle is abnormal in appearance.

Type IV: Most severe type, anotia; all external structures of the ears are absent. Defects affecting the external ear such as the auricle results from malformation or suppression of the auricular hillocks, which are small swellings on the embryonic visceral arches or the beginnings of the external ears; the small swellings are derived from the first and second pharyngeal arches. Because the ears and the kidneys develop simultaneously, children with ear defects are often checked for kidney defects at birth.

== Related syndromes ==
"20% to 40% of children with microtia/anotia will have additional defects that could suggest a syndrome."

Treacher-Collins syndrome: (TCS) A congenital disorder caused by a defective protein known as treacle, and is characterized by craniofacial deformities; malformed or absent ears are also seen in this syndrome. The effects may be mild, undiagnosed to severe, leading to death. Because the ear defects are much different in this disorder and not only affect the outer ear, but the middle ear as well, reconstructive surgery may not help with the child's hearing and in this case a bone-anchored hearing aid would be best. BAHA will only work, however if the inner ear and nerve are intact.

Goldenhar syndrome: A rare congenital birth defect that causes abnormalities of facial development. Also known as oculoauricular dysplasia. The facial anomalies include underdeveloped, asymmetric half of the face. The defect is capable of affecting tissue, muscle, and the underlying bone structure of the side of the face with the abnormality.

Ablepharon macrostomia syndrome : (AMS) A rare genetic disorder characterized by various physical anomalies which affect the craniofacial area, the skin, the fingers, and the genitals.

== Treatment ==
The treatment will vary with the different grades, but the most common is a surgical repair. The surgical option is cosmetic reconstruction of the external ear's normal shape and repair of the ear canal. In less severe cases, the reconstruction will be sufficient to restore hearing. In grades of anotia/microtia that affect the middle ear, the surgery with the use of a bone-anchored hearing aid (BAHA) will likely restore the hearing. The BAHA may be surgically implanted onto the skull which would allow for some hearing repair by conduction through the skull bone. "This allows sound vibrations to travel through bones in the head to the inner ear."

BAHA: An implantable hearing device. It is the only hearing aid device that works via direct bone conduction.
