= Maurice Goldenhar =

Maurice Goldenhar (January 15, 1924 – September 11, 2001) was a Belgian–American ophthalmologist and general practitioner. He emigrated from Belgium to the United States in 1940. He later returned to Europe for medical studies, and then returned once again to the United States.

He first diagnosed what became known as Goldenhar syndrome in 1952.

Goldenhar died in 2001 at age 77 as a result of a lengthy illness.
