= Goldenhar syndrome =

Rare birth defect; incomplete development of the face on one side

- Other names: Oculo-auriculo-vertebral spectrum (OAVS), oculo-auriculo-vertebral dysplasia (OAV), expanded spectrum of hemifacial microsomia, facioauriculovertebral dysplasia
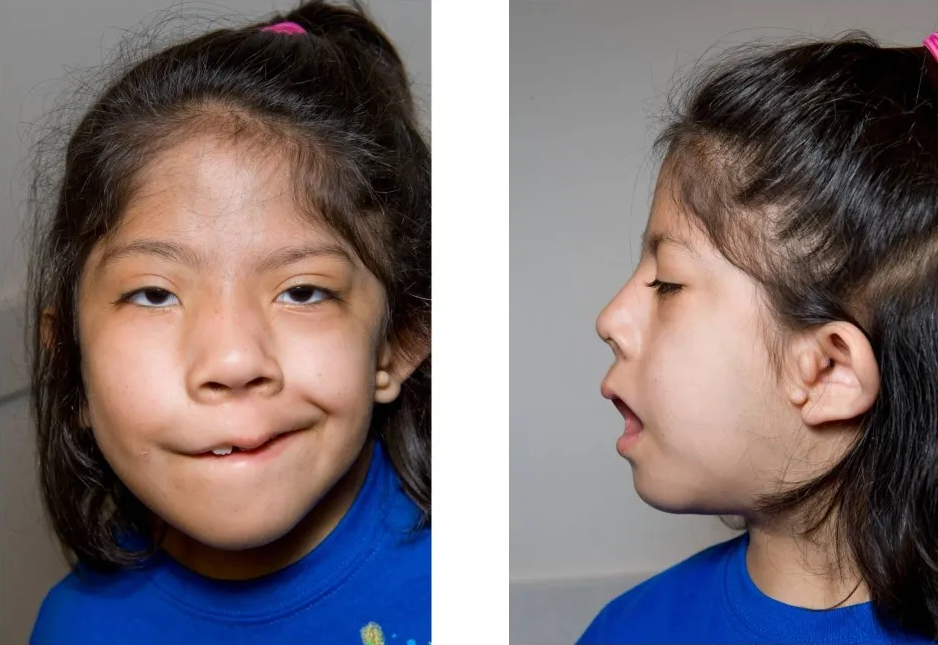
- Female with Goldenhar syndrome, showing preauricular skin tags
- Specialty: Medical genetics

Goldenhar syndrome is a rare congenital defect characterized by incomplete development of the ear, nose, soft palate, lip and mandible on usually one side of the body. Common clinical manifestations include limbal dermoids, preauricular skin tags and strabismus. It is associated with anomalous development of the first branchial arch and second branchial arch.

The term is sometimes used interchangeably with hemifacial microsomia, although this definition is usually reserved for cases without internal organ and vertebrae disruption.

It affects between 1 in 3,500 and 1 in 5,600 live births, with a male-to-female ratio of 3:2.

== Signs and symptoms ==
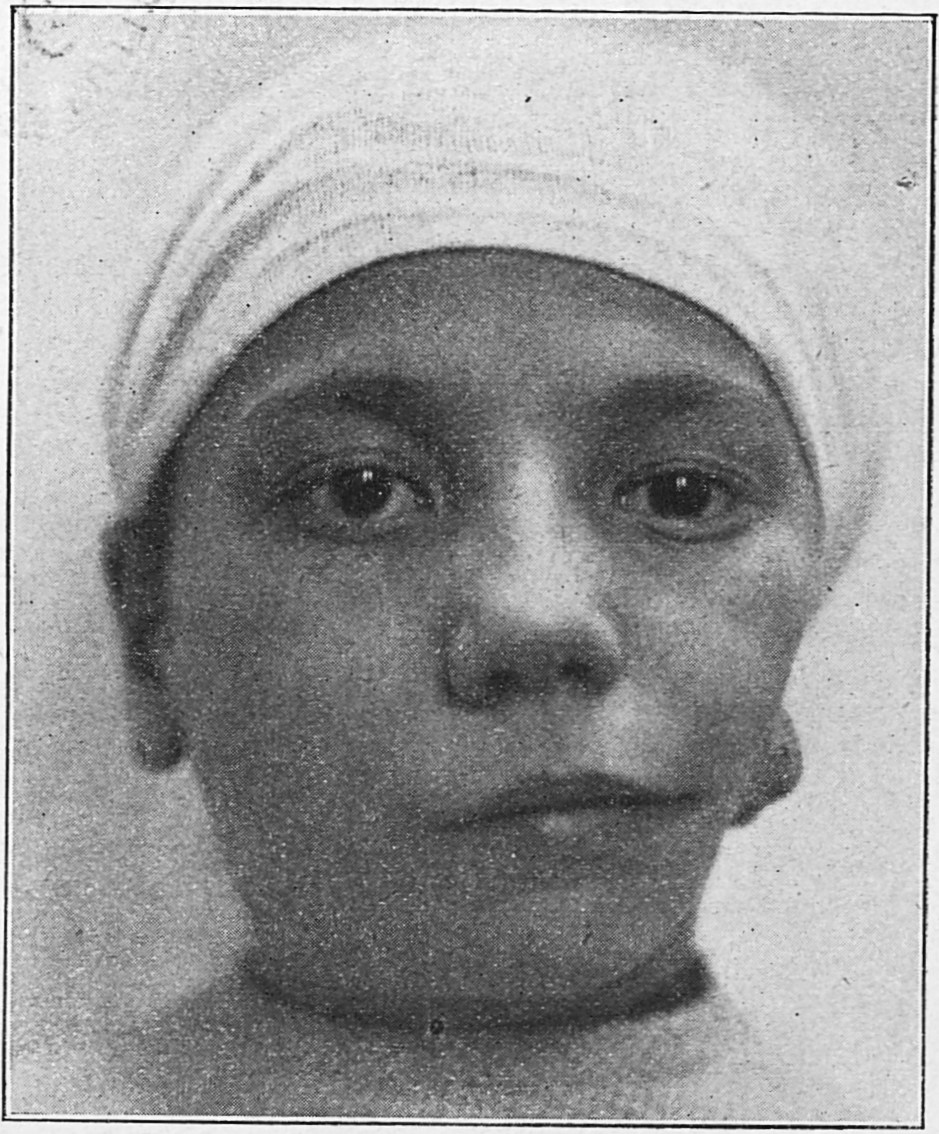
Severe Goldenhar syndrome in a 10-year-old girl

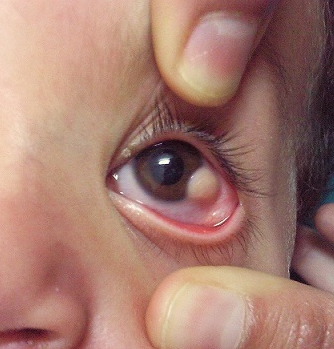
Limbal dermoid as seen in Goldenhar syndrome

This condition can be inherited in an autosomal dominant manner.

Chief markers of Goldenhar syndrome are incomplete development of the ear, nose, soft palate, lip, and mandible on usually one side of the body. Additionally, some patients will have growing issues with internal organs, especially heart, kidneys and lungs. Typically, the organ will either not be present on one side or will be underdeveloped. While it is more usual for there to be problems on only one side, it has been known for defects to occur bilaterally (approximate incidence 10% of confirmed GS cases).

Other problems can include severe scoliosis (twisting of the vertebrae), limbal dermoids and hearing loss (see hearing loss with craniofacial syndromes), and deafness or blindness in one or both ears/eyes. Granulosa cell tumors may be associated as well, although rare.

== Causes ==
The cause of Goldenhar syndrome is largely unknown. However, it is thought to be multifactorial, although there may be a genetic component, which would account for certain familial patterns. It has been suggested that there is a branchial arch development issue late in the first trimester.

An increase in Goldenhar syndrome in the children of Gulf War veterans has been suggested, but the difference was shown to be statistically insignificant.

== Diagnosis ==
No general consensus on the minimal diagnostic criteria exists. The syndrome is characterized by hemifacial microsomia due to underdevelopment of structures derived from the 1st and 2nd branchial arches such as eyes, ears, palate, mandible. However, the presentation of the syndrome is highly variable. Some of its features may include:

- Ocular abnormalities: epibulbar dermoids, microphthalmia, anophthalmia, eye asymmetry or dysmorphy.
- Otorhinolaryngological abnormalities: microtia, anotia, partial to complete atresia of external acoustic meatus, preauricular appendages, deafness, and microsomia.
- Skeletal abnormalities: mandibular deformities, torticollis, scoliosis, kyphosis. * Other organ abnormalities: cardiac defects (most frequently atrial septal defect and ventricular septal defects), and renal defects such as agenesis or multicystic kidneys.
- Other features: Small stature, delayed psychomotor development, intellectual disability (seen with cerebral developmental anomalies and microphthalmia), speech disorders and autistic behaviors

== Treatment ==
Treatment is usually confined to such surgical intervention as may be necessary to help the child to develop e.g. jaw distraction/bone grafts, ocular dermoid debulking (see below), repairing cleft palate/lip, repairing heart malformations or spinal surgery. Some patients with Goldenhar syndrome will require assistance as they grow by means of hearing aids or glasses. Stem cell grafting (womb tissue grafting) has been successfully used to "reprogram" eye dermoids, effectively halting the regrowth of eye dermoids. These tissues that grow on the eye are "mis-programmed" cells (sometimes tooth or nail cells instead of eye cells).

== Epidemiology ==
Prevalence ranges from 1 in 3,500 to 8,500 births.

== Eponym ==
The condition was documented in 1952 by Belgian–American ophthalmologist Maurice Goldenhar (1924–2001).
