= 1p36 deletion syndrome =

- Other names: Monosomy 1p36
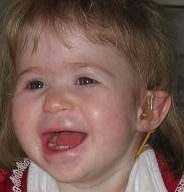
- A toddler showing facial symptoms of the syndrome.
- Differential diagnosis: Rett syndrome, Angelman syndrome, Prader-Willi syndrome
- Frequency: 1 in 5,000 to 1 in 10,000

1p36 deletion syndrome is a congenital genetic disorder characterized by moderate to severe intellectual disability, delayed growth, hypotonia, seizures, limited speech ability, malformations, hearing and vision impairment, and distinct facial features. The symptoms may vary, depending on the exact location of the chromosomal deletion.

The condition is caused by a genetic deletion (loss of a segment of DNA) on the outermost band on the short arm (p) of chromosome 1. It is one of the most common deletion syndromes. The syndrome is thought to affect one in every 5,000 to 10,000 births.

== Signs and symptoms ==
There are a number of signs and symptoms characteristic of monosomy 1p36, but no one individual will display all of the possible features. In general, children will exhibit failure to thrive and global delays.

=== Developmental and behavioral ===
Most young children with 1p36 deletion syndrome have delayed development of speech and motor skills. Speech is severely affected, with many children learning only a few words or having no speech at all. Behavioral problems are also common, and include temper outbursts, banging or throwing objects, striking people, screaming episodes, and self-injurious behavior (wrist biting, head striking/banging). A significant proportion of affected people are on the autism spectrum, and many exhibit stereotypy.

=== Neurologic ===
Most people with 1p36 deletion syndrome have some structural abnormality of the brain, and approximately half have epilepsy or other seizures. Almost all children exhibit some degree of hypotonia. Common structural brain abnormalities include agenesis of the corpus callosum, cerebral cortical atrophy, gait abnormalities, and ventriculomegaly. Dysphagia, esophageal reflux, and other feeding difficulties are also common.

=== Vision ===
The most common visual abnormalities associated with 1p36 deletion syndrome include farsightedness (hypermetropia), myopia (nearsightedness), and strabismus (cross-eyes). Less common but still recognized are blepharophimosis, cataracts, ocular albinism, optic atrophy, optic disk pallor, and optic nerve coloboma.

=== Distinct facial features ===
The facial features of 1p36 deletion syndrome have been considered to be characteristic, although few patients have been diagnosed solely on the basis of facial appearance. These features may include microcephaly (small head), which may be combined with brachycephaly (short head); small, deep-set eyes; straight eyebrows; epicanthal folds; a broad, flat nose and nasal bridge; underdevelopment of the midface (midface hypoplasia); a long philtrum; pointed chin; and abnormally shaped, rotated, low-set ears. Infants may have a large anterior fontanelle, or the anterior fontanelle may close late.

=== Other congenital defects ===
==== Skeletal ====
Short feet, brachydactyly (short fingers), and camptodactyly (permanent flexion of a finger), fifth finger clinodactyly (abnormal curvature) and other skeletal anomalies are sometimes found in conjunction with 1p36 deletion.

==== Heart ====
These patients may have congenital heart defects ranging from cardiac septal defects to valvular anomalies and tetralogy of Fallot. In particular, some of the patients may have LV noncompaction a form of dilated cardiomyopathy. This form of LV noncompaction cardiomyopathy is thought to be related to the deletion of the gene CASZ1, this gene in mice leads to ventricular noncompaction.

== Genetics ==
1p36 deletion syndrome is caused by the deletion of the most distal light band of the short arm of chromosome 1.

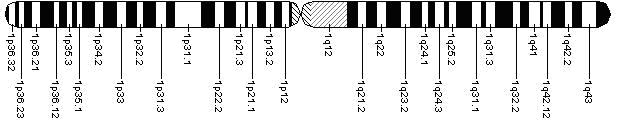
Human chromosome 1

The breakpoints for 1p36 deletion syndrome have been variable and are most commonly found from 1p36.13 to 1p36.33. 40 percent of all breakpoints occur 3 to 5 million base pairs from the telomere. The size of the deletion ranges from approximately 1.5 million base pairs to greater than 10 million.

Most deletions in chromosome 1p36 are de novo mutations. 20% of patients with 1p36 deletion syndrome inherit the disease from one parent who carries a balanced or symmetrical translocation.

== Diagnosis ==
1p36 deletion syndrome is usually suspected based on the signs and symptoms and confirmed by fluorescence in situ hybridization (FISH). Chromosomal microarray or karyotype analysis may also be used to diagnose 1p36 deletion.

== Treatment ==
There is no cure for 1p36 deletion syndrome, and treatment is focused on relieving symptoms of the disease. Of particular importance are appropriate medication for endocrine and neurologic manifestations, such as anti-seizure medications. Feeding difficulties can be managed with specialized assistive devices or with a gastrostomy (feeding) tube.

== Epidemiology ==
1p36 deletion syndrome is the most common terminal deletion syndrome in humans. It occurs in between 1 in 5000 and 1 in 10000 live births. Only 100 cases have been reported between 1981 and 2015. The Genetic and Rare Disease Information Center at the National Institutes of Health reports "fewer than 200,000 people in the United States are living with this disorder."
