= Blepharophimosis intellectual disability syndromes =

- Other names: BIDS (abbr.)
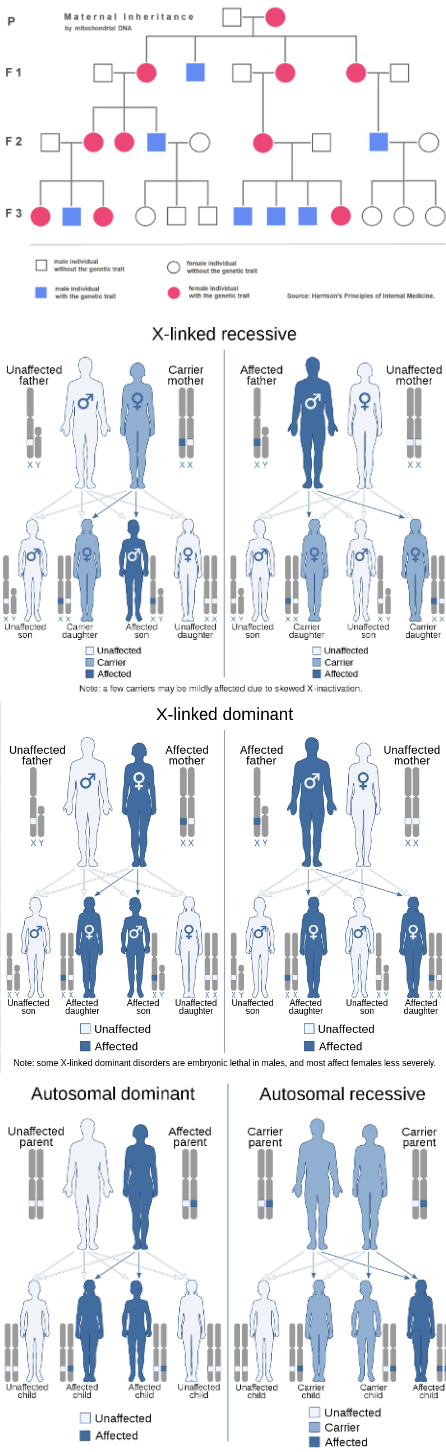
- Specialty: Medical genetics, Psychiatry
- Symptoms: Blepharophimosis and intellectual disabilities
- Usual onset: Neo-natal
- Duration: Lifelong
- Types: listed below
- Causes: Genetic mutation
- Prevention: none
- Prognosis: Medium to Ok
- Frequency: very rare, most of the syndromes have less than 200 cases reported in medical literature.

Blepharophimosis intellectual disability syndromes are a group of rare genetic disorders which are characterized by blepharophimosis, ptosis, and intellectual disabilities. These disorders usually follow either autosomal recessive, autosomal dominant, x-linked recessive, or mitochondrial inheritance patterns.

== Types ==
=== Oculocerebrofacial syndrome, Kaufman type ===
Oculocerebrofacial syndrome is a very rare autosomal recessive type of BIDS which is characterized by profound intellectual disabilities, cranio-facial dysmorphisms (including blepharophimosis), and other congenital ocular-brain-urogenital-skeletal anomalies. Only 19 cases have been reported in medical literature.

=== Blepharophimosis-intellectual disability syndrome, MKB type ===
This is a rare, X-linked recessive type of BIDS which is characterized by developmental and speech delay, intellectual disabilities, urogenital anomalies, facial dysmorphisms (including blepharophimosis), and autistic-like behavior. Additional findings include joint hypermobility, hearing loss, dental anomalies, and microcephaly.

=== Ohdo syndrome ===
Also known Blepharophimosis-intellectual disability syndrome, Ohdo type, it is a very rare type of BIDS that is characterized by blepharophimosis, ptosis, intellectual disabilities, hearing loss, and underdevelopment of teeth. Autosomal recessive, dominant, X-linked recessive, and mitochondrial inheritance patterns have been suggested. Only 30 cases have been described in medical literature.

=== Say-Barber-Biesecker-Young-Simpson syndrome ===
Also known as Blepharophimosis-intellectual disability syndrome, SBBYS type, it is a very rare autosomal dominant type of BIDS which is characterized by craniofacial dysmorphisms, skeletal anomalies, developmental delay, hypotonia, and intellectual disabilities. It is caused by mutations in the KAT6B gene in chromosome 10. Only 122 cases have been described in medical literature.

=== Blepharophimosis-intellectual disability syndrome, Verloes type ===
This is a very rare type of BIDS which is characterized by craniofacial dysmorphisms, epilepsy, hypsarrythmia, intellectual disabilities, psycho-motor delays, and genital anomalies. It's inheritance pattern is unknown.

=== Blepharophimosis-intellectual disability syndrome/genitopatellar overlap syndrome ===
-
