= Edward Treacher Collins =

British ophthalmologist (1862–1932)

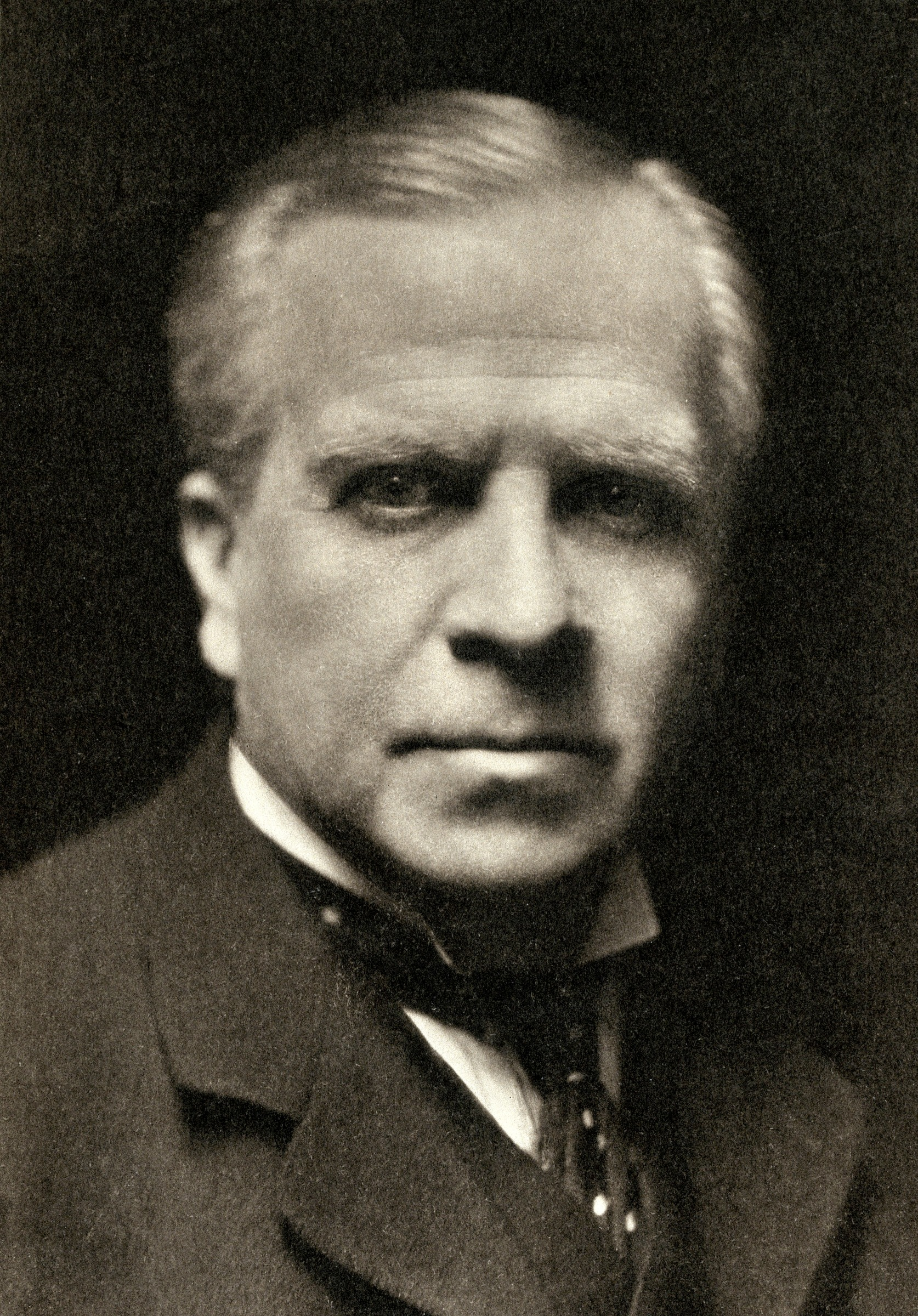
Edward Treacher Collins

Edward Treacher Collins (28 May 1862 – 13 December 1932) was a British surgeon and ophthalmologist. He is best known for describing the Treacher Collins syndrome.

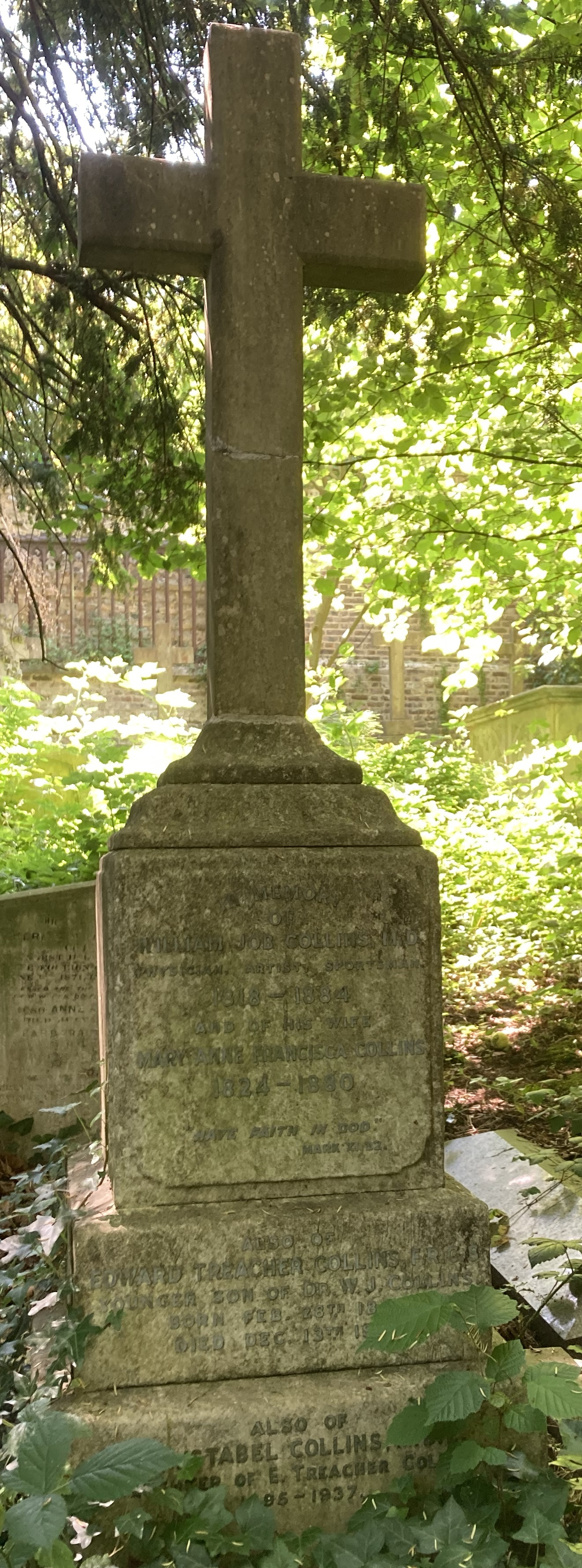
Family grave of Edward Treacher Collins in Highgate Cemetery

== Biography ==
He was the son of Dr. William Job Collins and Miss Treacher. Treacher Collins used his mother's maiden name and his father's surname without a hyphen, according to the custom of the time.

He entered University College London. In 1879 he began studies at Middlesex Hospital; he received his medical degree in 1883. Influenced by his older brother Sir William Collins, he decided to specialize in ophthalmology. For his internship, he went to the Moorfields Eye Hospital, where he remained as a faculty member for the next 48 years. His work culminated in the publication Researches into the Anatomy and Pathology of the Eye (1896), which earned him worldwide recognition.

He died on 13 December 1932 and is buried in a family grave on the west side of Highgate Cemetery.
