= Hearing level =

Hearing level is the sound pressure level produced by an audiometer at a specific frequency. It is measured in decibels with reference to audiometric zero. Hearing of speech is considered to be impaired when the hearing level is shifted 25 dB or more.
