= Hearing loss with craniofacial syndromes =

Hearing loss with craniofacial syndromes is a common occurrence. Many of these multianomaly disorders involve structural malformations of the outer or middle ear, making a significant hearing loss highly likely.

== Treacher Collins syndrome ==
Individuals with Treacher Collins syndrome often have both cleft palate and hearing loss, in addition to other disabilities. Hearing loss is often secondary to absent, small or unusually formed ears (microtia) and commonly results from malformations of the middle ear. Researchers have found that most patients with Treacher Collins syndrome have symmetric external ear canal abnormalities and symmetrically dysmorphic or absent ossicles in the middle ear space. Inner ear structure is largely normal. Most patients show a moderate hearing impairment or greater, and the type of loss is generally a conductive hearing loss. Patients with Treacher Collins syndrome exhibit hearing losses similar to those of patients with malformed or missing ossicles (Pron et al., 1993).

== Pierre Robin sequence ==
Persons with Pierre Robin sequence (PRS) are at greater risk for hearing impairment than persons with cleft lip and/or palate without PRS. One study showed an average of 83% hearing loss in PRS, compared to 60% in cleft individuals without PRS (Handzic et al., 1995). Similarly, PRS individuals typically exhibit conductive, bilateral hearing losses that are greater in degree than in cleft individuals without PRS. Middle ear effusion is generally apparent, with no middle ear or inner ear malformations. Accordingly, management by ear tubes (myringotomy tubes) is often effective and may restore normal levels of hearing (Handzic et al., 1995).

== Stickler syndrome ==
The hearing loss most typical in patients with Stickler syndrome is a sensorineural hearing loss, indicating that the source of the deficit lies in the inner ear, the vestibulocochlear nerve or the processing centers of the brain. Szymko-Bennett et al. (2001) found that the overall hearing loss in Type I Stickler Syndrome is generally mild and is not significantly progressive. Hearing loss is more common in the higher frequencies, from about 4000–8000 Hz (Szymko-Bennett et al., 2001). This mildly progressive sensorineural loss, or more significant losses (associated with Types II and III Stickler syndrome) is present in about 80% of patients with Stickler syndrome. However, other patients are also susceptible to conductive losses, similar to nonsyndromic cleft patients (Peterson-Falzone et al., 2001).

== Apert syndrome ==
Patients with Apert syndrome have a high occurrence of middle ear disease, otitis media and conductive hearing loss (Perterson-Fazone et al., 2001). Conductive hearing loss is frequently seen in this population due to almost constant middle ear disease (Gould et al., 1982). Furthermore, inner ear anomalies have been described in Apert syndrome, such as dilatation of the vestibule, dysplastic semicircular canals and cochlear malformations (Zhou G et al. Otol Neurotol. 2009 Feb;30(2):184-9)

== Crouzon syndrome ==
Patients with Crouzon syndrome sometimes exhibit malformations of the external ear and/or the middle ear, such as malalignment of the pinna (Peterson-Falzone et al., 2001). Literature has suggested that persons with Crouzon syndrome typically have conductive hearing loss caused by middle ear effusion (or fluid in the middle ear) and perforation to ossicular fixation (ossicles), intratympanic bony masses (tympanic membrane), ossicular anomalies and closure of the oval window. Patients with a sensorineural hearing loss have also been reported but are less likely to occur.

== Pfeiffer syndrome ==
A conductive hearing loss along with middle ear disease is most commonly seen in patients with Pfeiffer syndrome; although, there have been reports of mixed hearing loss as well. The hearing loss is most typically caused by stenosis or atresia of the auditory canal, middle ear hypoplasia and ossicular hypoplasia (Vallino-Napoli, 1996).

== Ectrodactyly–ectrodermal dysplasia–cleft syndrome ==
Conductive hearing loss has been reported by many with ectrodactyly–ectodermal dysplasia–cleft (EEC) syndrome in association with a cleft palate (Perterson-Falzone, 2001).

== Saethre–Chotzen syndrome ==
In Saethre–Chotzen syndrome, the ears may be low set, posteriorly rotated, have other minor anomalies and there may be a presence of a conductive hearing loss or a mixed hearing loss (Perterson-Falszone, 2001). Hearing loss in this group can also be caused by middle ear disease when a cleft palate is present.

== Velocardiofacial syndrome ==
About 70% of individuals with velocardiofacial syndrome (VCFS) have minor auricular malformations, or malformations of the ear. In this syndrome, the ears are typically low-set and somewhat posteriorly rotated. In addition to external malformations, individuals with VCFS are more vulnerable to otitis media because of the presence of a cleft or other form of velopharyngeal inadequacy. The hearing loss associated with VCFS is conductive when otitis media is present (Peterson-Falzone et al., 2001). There are also sporadic reports of sensorineural hearing loss and a mixed hearing loss. Of individuals with VCFS who have a hearing loss, only 11% had a sensorineural loss and 5% a mixed loss (Reyes et al., 1999).

== Hemifacial microsomia ==
Individuals with hemifacial microsomia, also called oculoauriculo-vertebral spectrum, often have ear malformations. These malformations can be in the form of preauricular ear pits, complete absence of the auricle, stenosis or atresia of the external auditory canal, ossicular malformations, middle ear deformities, and incomplete pneumatization of the temporal bone. Rahbar et al. (2001) found that 95% of individuals with this syndrome have an ear malformation of some type. In addition to ear malformations, a conductive hearing loss can be present, typically ranging from mild to severe. There are also reported cases of cochlear involvement and sensorineural hearing loss. Rahbar et al. (2001) found that 86% of patients with Hemifacial Microsomia have a conductive hearing loss and 10% have a sensorineural hearing loss. There is no correlation between the severity of dysmorphic features and the degree of hearing loss, meaning individuals with mild malformations can have severely impaired hearing.

== Nager syndrome ==
Individuals with Nager syndrome typically have the malformations of the auricle, external auditory canal and middle ear, including the ossicles. These malformations were found in 80% of individuals with Nager syndrome. Inner ear malformations, however, are not typically seen in this population. Middle ear disease is common among individuals with Nager syndrome. Chronic otitis media and Eustachian tube deformity can result in conductive hearing loss. For this reason, early detection and treatment for middle ear disease is crucial in this population. Sensorineural hearing loss is not a typical characteristic of Nager syndrome; however, a subset of individuals present with a mixed hearing loss, due to a progressive sensorineural component combined with the typical conductive hearing loss (Herrman et al., 2005).

== See also ==
- 22q11.2 deletion syndrome
