= Choristoma =

Masses of normal tissues found in an abnormal location

Choristomas, a form of heterotopia, are masses of normal tissues found in abnormal locations. In contrast to a neoplasm or tumor, the growth of a choristoma is normally regulated.

It is different from a hamartoma. The two can be differentiated as follows: a hamartoma is disorganized overgrowth of tissues in their normal location (e.g., Peutz–Jeghers polyps), while a choristoma is normal tissue growth in an abnormal location (e.g., osseous choristoma, gastric tissue located in distal ileum in Meckel diverticulum).
