= Bone-anchored hearing aid =

Type of hearing aid based on bone conduction

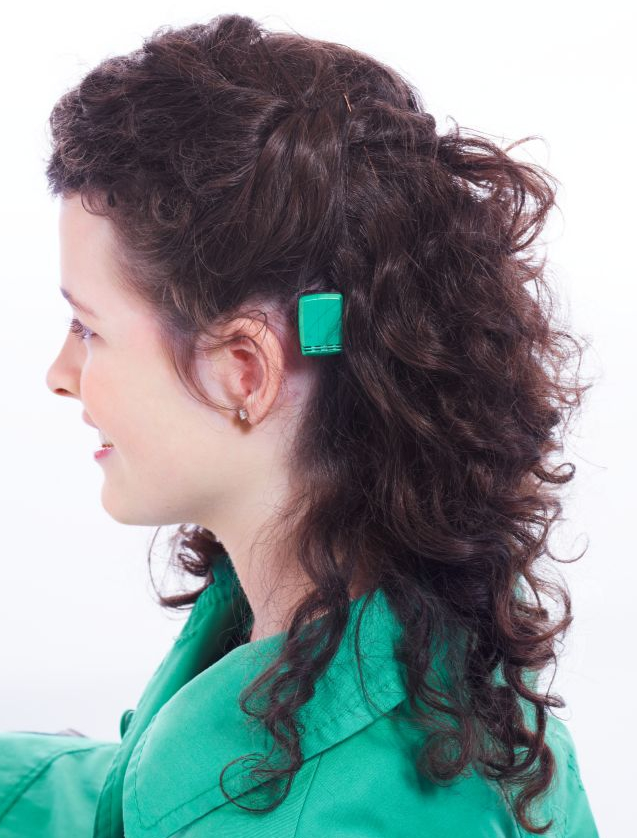
- A BAHA user with a sound processor attached behind her ear
- Other names: Bone-anchored hearing device

A bone-anchored hearing aid (BAHA) is a type of hearing aid based on bone conduction. It is primarily suited for people who have conductive hearing losses, unilateral hearing loss, single-sided deafness and people with mixed hearing losses who cannot otherwise wear 'in the ear' or 'behind the ear' hearing aids. They are more expensive than conventional hearing aids, and their placement involves invasive surgery which carries a risk of complications, although when complications do occur, they are usually minor.

Two of the causes of hearing loss are lack of function in the inner ear (cochlea) and when the sound has problems in reaching the nerve cells of the inner ear. Examples of the first include age-related hearing loss and hearing loss due to noise exposure. A patient born without external ear canals is an example of the latter for which a conventional hearing aid with a mould in the ear canal opening would not be effective. Some with this condition have normal inner ear function, as the external ear canal and the inner ear are developed at different stages during pregnancy. With normal inner anatomy, sound conducted by the skull bone improves hearing.

A vibrator with a steel spring over the head or in heavy frames of eyeglasses pressed towards the bone behind the ear has been used to bring sound to the inner ear. This has, however, several disadvantages, such as discomfort and pain due to the pressure needed. The sound quality is also impaired as much of the sound energy is lost in the soft tissue over the skull bone, particularly for the higher sound frequencies important for speech understanding in noise.

== Medical use ==
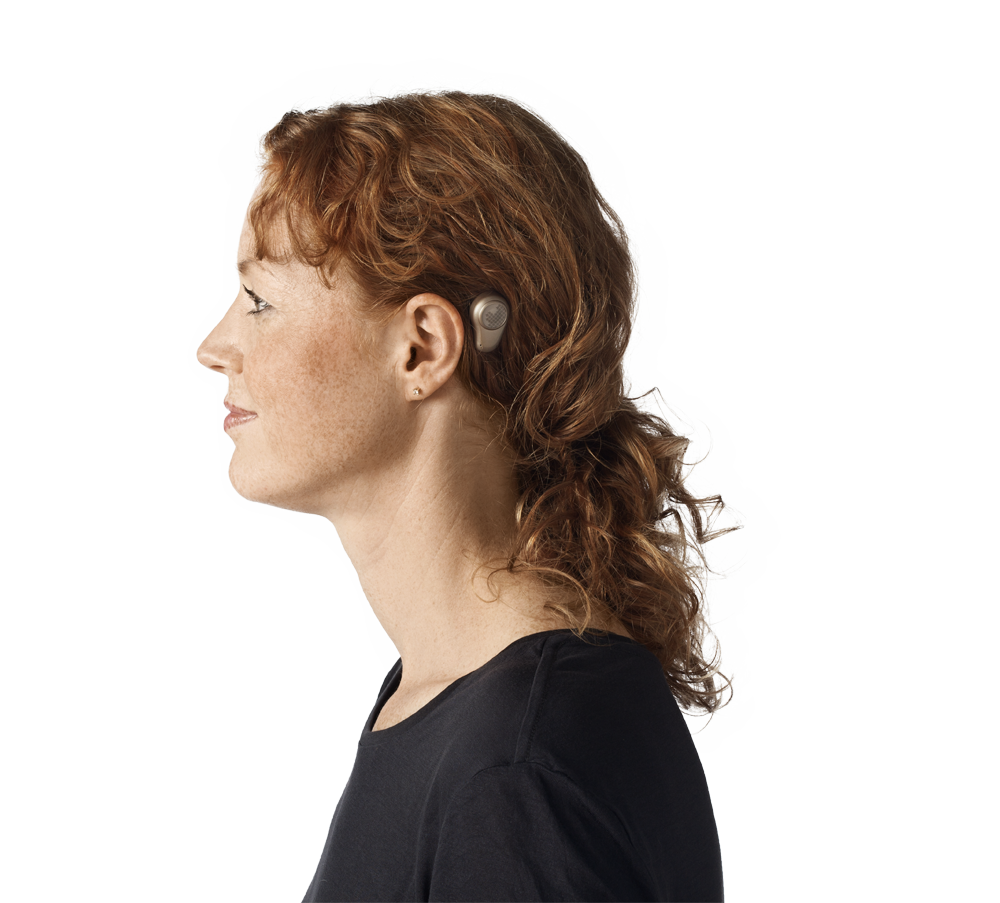
A sound processor behind the ear

Bone-anchored hearing aids use a surgically implanted abutment to transmit sound by direct conduction through bone to the inner ear, bypassing the external auditory canal and middle ear. A titanium prosthesis is surgically embedded into the skull with a small abutment exposed outside the skin. A sound processor sits on this abutment and transmits sound vibrations to the titanium implant. The implant vibrates the skull and inner ear, which stimulate the nerve fibers of the inner ear, producing the sensation of hearing.

The surgery is often performed under local anesthesia and as an outpatient procedure. An important piece of information for patients is that if they for whatever reason are not satisfied with the BAHA solution, removing the implant is easy.

By bypassing the outer or middle ear, BAHA can increase hearing in noisy situations and help localise sounds. In addition to improved speech understanding, it results in a natural sound with less distortion and feedback compared with conventional hearing aids. The ear canal is left open for comfort, and helps to reduce any problems caused by chronic ear infections or allergies. In patients with single-sided sensorineural deafness, BAHA sends the sound by the skull bone from the deaf side to the inner ear of the hearing side. This transfer of sound gives a 360° sound awareness.

BAHAs may facilitate normal speech development.

=== Chronic ear disease ===
This fairly common condition is often associated with continuous or intermittent drainage from the ear canal. These patients may also have a hearing loss and need amplification. A conventional air conduction aid with a mold placed in the ear canal opening may not be appropriate due to the drainage, and may even provoke drainage. If the hearing loss is significant an air conduction aid may have difficulty overcoming the dysfunction of the eardrum and middle ear bones. Bone conduction hearing device bypassing the middle ear may be a more appropriate treatment for these patients. Good transmission of sound in the bone, with reduced attenuation and distortion may be possible.

=== Single-sided deafness ===
A person with unilateral hearing loss may have functional difficulty hearing even when the other ear is normal, particularly in demanding situations such as noisy environments and when several people are speaking the same time. A complication in single-sided deafness is hearing impairment in the hearing ear. Conventional ear surgery involves a risk of hearing loss due to the surgical procedure. Ear surgeons may be reluctant to perform surgery on an only hearing ear. The BAHA surgery avoids this risk and may be an appropriate treatment. An extended trial of a BAHA system with a headband prior to surgery led to more realistic expectations. In the trial, 50% of the candidates wished to proceed to surgery.

=== External ear canal problems ===
Irritation in the external ear canal due to inflammation or eczema may be a condition for which a conventional air conduction aid is not an appropriate treatment. Direct bone conduction may be an option.

=== Malformations ===
Patients with malformations are not always suitable for reconstructive surgery. Treacher Collins syndrome patients may have significant malformations with ossicular defects and an abnormal route of the facial nerve. These structures, as well as the inner ear, could be in danger at surgery.

Patients with Down syndrome may have a narrow ear canal and middle ear malformation leading to impaired hearing. Some part of the cognitive delay seen in these children may be partly due to their poor hearing.

The surgery can only take place once the skull is at least 2.5 mm thick. Children with certain syndromes may have a slighter build, thinner bone, or unusual anatomy. Other children may have a thicker skull at a younger age, so it is difficult to give a specific age for surgery.

In the U.S., the Food and Drug Administration only approves BAHA implantation of children aged five years or older.

For infants and young children prior to surgery, the sound processor can be worn on a head band or soft band which the infant wears to hold it against the skull.

== Side effects ==
Complications of BAHA systems can be considered as either related to the bone (hard tissue) or the soft tissue.

- Bone
  - Cerebrospinal fluid leak (due to skull damage and dura penetration)
  - Failure of osseointegration
  - Chronic infection
  - Trauma
- Soft tissue
  - Irritation of the skin surrounding the implant
  - Skin flap necrosis (death of the skin flap, e.g. due to interrupted blood supply)
  - Overgrowth of skin over the device
  - Wound dehiscence (splitting apart of the wound)
  - Bleeding or hematoma formation
  - Persistent pain

Soft-tissue complications are much more common, and most are managed with topical treatments. Children are more likely to develop both kinds of complications than adults. Sometimes, a second surgical procedure is required. Complications are less likely with good wound hygiene. Other drawbacks of BAHA include accidental or spontaneous loss of the bone implant, and patient refusal for treatment due to stigma.

== Surgical procedure ==
The bone behind the ear is exposed through a U-shaped or straight incision or with the help of a specially designed BAHA dermatome. A hole, 3 or 4 mm deep depending on the thickness of the bone, is drilled. The hole is widened and the implant with the mounted coupling is inserted under generous cooling to minimize surgical trauma to the bone. In a single stage procedure, the fixture and abutment are placed simultaneously. For children or patients who may damage the abutment prior to osseointegration of the fixture, a two stage procedure may be performed in which the fixture is placed first, and after osseointegration roughly 6 months later, the abutment is attached. In children, a sleeper implant may be placed to serve as a backup in case the main implant is damaged.

Some surgeons perform a reduction of the subcutaneous soft tissue. The rationale for this is to reduce the mobility between implant and skin to avoid inflammation at the penetration site. This reduction of the soft tissue has been questioned and some surgeons do not perform any or a minimum of it. The rationale for this is that any surgery will result in some scar tissue that could be the focus of infection. The infections seen early during the development of the surgical procedure could perhaps be explained by the lack of seal between implant and abutment allowing bacteria to enter the space. A new helium tight seal may be advantageous and prevent biofilm formation. This will also allow the surgeon to use longer abutments should a need exist. Three to six weeks later or even earlier, the audiologist will fit and adjust the hearing processor according to the patient's hearing level. The fitting will be made using a special program in a computer.

The original surgical procedure has been described in detail by Tjellström et al. 2001.

== Handling ==
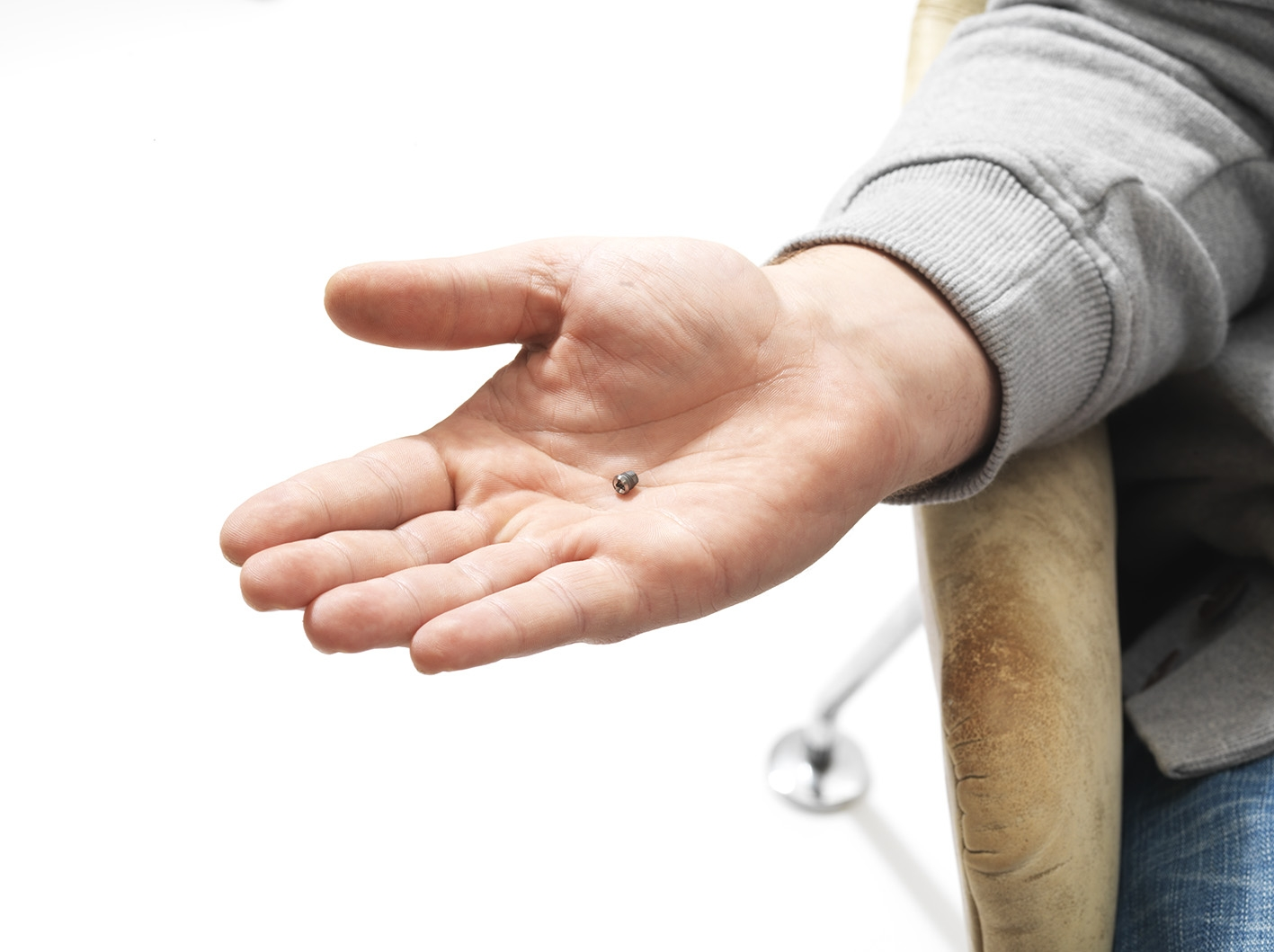
An implant shown in actual size in adult hand

An area where skin is penetrated requires care and cleaning because of the risk of inflammation around the abutment. Daily cleaning is required.

== Small children ==
Hearing is of importance for a normal speech development. The skull bone in children is often very thin and softer than in the adult. Surgery is thus often delayed until the age of four to five years. In the meantime, the child with bilateral atresia can be fitted with a band around the head with a coupling for a BAHA. This may be done at the age of one month. Infants at this age may tolerate this well. As described above, for children who may be at risk of damaging the abutment prior to osseointegration of the fixture, a two stage procedure may be performed in which the fixture is placed first, and after osseointegration roughly 6 months later, the abutment is attached. In children, a sleeper implant may be placed to serve as a backup in case the main implant is damaged.

== History ==
Patients with chronic ear infection where the drum and/or the small bones in the middle ear are damaged often have hearing loss, but difficulties in using a hearing aid fitted in the ear canal. Direct bone conduction through a vibrator attached to a skin-penetrating implant addresses these disadvantages.

In 1977, the first three patients were implanted with a bone-conduction hearing solution by Anders Tjellström at the Ear, Nose, and Throat Department at Sahlgrenska University Hospital in Gothenburg, Sweden. A 4-mm-long titanium screw with a diameter of 3.75 mm was inserted in the bone behind the ear, and a bone conduction hearing aid was attached.

The term osseointegration was coined by Professor Brånemark. During animal studies, he found the bone tissue attached to the titanium implant without any soft tissue in between. He also showed an such an implant could take a heavy load. His definition of osseointegration was "direct contact between living bone and an implant that can take a load".

The first clinical application of titanium was in oral surgery, where implants were used for retention of dentures. Brånemark sought an acoustic way to evaluate osseointegration. A patient with implants in the jaws was fitted with a bone vibrator on one of his implants. When tested, the patient experienced very loud sound even at low stimulation levels, indicating sound could propagate very well in the bone. It has later been shown by Håkansson that the sound transmission in bone is linear, indicating low distortion of the sound.

The implant in the bone is made of titanium and will osseointegrate. The hearing instrument is impedance-matched. Osseointegration has been defined as the direct contact between living bone and an implant that can take a load, with no soft tissue at the interface.

== Models ==
There are several models of bone-anchored hearing aids available. Most common are the BAHA from Australian company Cochlear, and the Ponto from Danish manufacturers Oticon Medical. There are also other types of bone conduction hearing aids, such as implants and non-surgical devices.

== Costs ==
In the US, the cost of the Baha device is about $4,000. In the Netherlands, the cost of the device is around €3000 (in 2008). The cost of the titanium implant, surgery, and aftercare from surgeon and audiologist must also be considered.
