= Choanal atresia =

Congenital disorder where the nasal passage is blocked

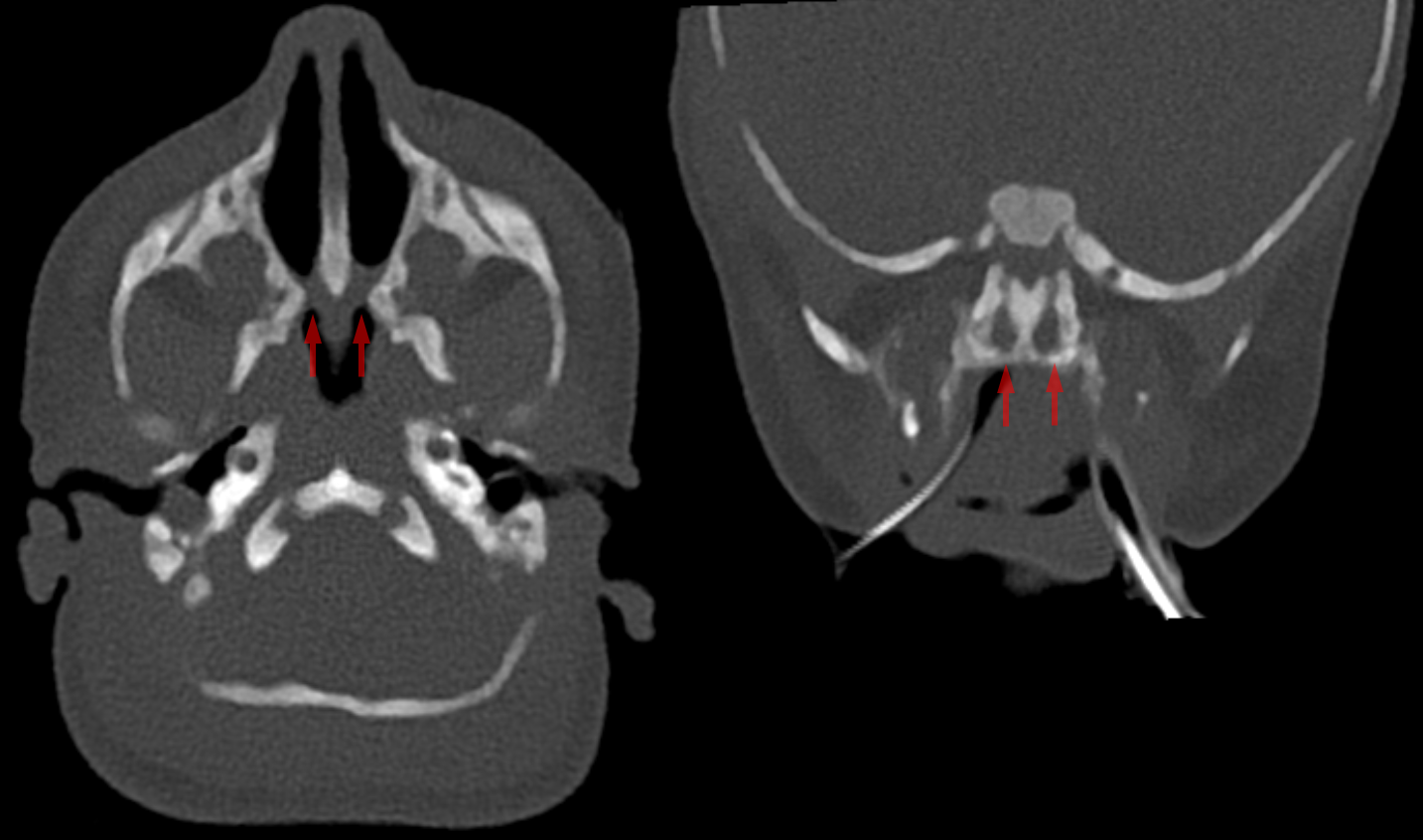
- Bilateral membranous choanal atresia in CT scan
- Specialty: Medical genetics, otorhinolaryngology
- Symptoms: difficulty breathing, cyanosis
- Complications: cyanosis, hypoxia
- Usual onset: from birth
- Types: unilateral, bilateral
- Causes: developmental problem with nasal cavity and palate
- Risk factors: largely unknown
- Diagnostic method: inability to place nasal catheter, CT scan
- Treatment: surgery to reopen the airway
- Prognosis: unilateral: very good bilateral: good with successful surgery
- Frequency: 1 in 7,000 to 1 in 5,000 live births

Choanal atresia is a congenital disorder where the back of the nasal passage (choana) is blocked, usually by abnormal bony or soft tissue (membranous) due to failed hole development of the nasal fossae during prenatal development. It causes persistent rhinorrhea, and with bilateral choanal atresia, an obstructed airway that can cause cyanosis and hypoxia.

Choanal atresia is diagnosed based on the inability to place a nasal catheter, and radiology results (particularly CT scans). Treatment involves maintaining an open airway, and may involve surgery to reopen the airway, potentially with a stent. Choanal atresia is a fairly rare condition, affecting between 1 in 7,000 to 1 in 5,000 live births. It is more common in females and is more often unilateral.

== Presentation ==
Choanal atresia can be unilateral or bilateral.

- A unilateral choanal atresia may not be detected until much later in life because the baby manages to get along with only one nostril available for breathing. Symptoms are minor, including persistent rhinorrhea (mainly normal mucus) and chronic sinusitis.
- Bilateral choanal atresia is a life-threatening condition because the baby will be unable to breathe directly after birth as babies are obligate nasal breathers (they mainly use their noses to breathe). In some cases, this may present as cyanosis while the baby is feeding, because the oral air passages are blocked by the tongue, further restricting the airway. Cyanosis may improve when the baby cries, as the oral airway is used. These babies may require airway resuscitation soon after birth.

=== Associated conditions ===
Choanal atresia is associated with a higher risk of other airway problems, including:

- tracheomalacia.
- laryngomalacia.
- subglottic stenosis.

Sometimes, babies born with choanal atresia also have other abnormalities:

- coloboma.
- heart defects and cardiovascular disease.
- intellectual disability.
- growth impairment.
- genital hypoplasia.
- CHARGE syndrome.
- others.

Also any condition that causes significant depression of the nasal bridge or midface retraction can be associated with choanal atresia. Examples include the craniosynostosis syndromes such as Crouzon syndrome, Pfeiffer syndrome, Treacher Collins syndrome, Apert syndrome, and Antley-Bixler syndrome.

== Cause ==
Choanal atresia is caused by problems with the development of the nasal cavity and the palate. Development begins with neural crest cells. Frontonasal processes fold, forming nasal placodes (nasal pits). The nasobuccal membrane must rupture in places to form the choanae. A number of theories exist as to how this developmental process causes choanal atresia.

=== Risk factors ===
Very few risk factors for choanal atresia have been identified. In general, choanal atresia is associated with a higher risk of other birth defects. Bilateral choanal atresia is more associated than unilateral choanal atresia.

While causes are unknown, both genetic and environmental triggers are suspected. One study suggests that chemicals that act as endocrine disrupters may put an unborn infant at risk. A 2012 epidemiological study looked at atrazine, a commonly used herbicide in the U.S., and found that women who lived in counties in Texas with the highest levels of this chemical being used to treat agricultural crops were 80 times more likely to give birth to infants with choanal atresia or stenosis compared to women who lived in the counties with the lowest levels. Another epidemiological report in 2010 found even higher associations between increased incidents of choanal atresia and exposure to second-hand-smoke, coffee consumption, high maternal zinc and B-12 intake and exposure to anti-infective urinary tract medications. The anti-thyroid medication methimazole has been associated with the development of choanal atresia in rare cases if given during the first trimester of pregnancy.

== Mechanism ==
Choanal atresia causes closure of the posterior choanae in the nasal cavity. Around 30% of these affect just the bone, while around 70% affect both bone and membranes. Bones affected can include the body of the sphenoid bone, the vomer, the medial pterygoid process of the sphenoid bone, and the horizontal plate of the palatine bone.

== Diagnosis ==
=== Nasal catheter ===
Choanal atresia can be suspected if it is impossible to insert a nasal catheter. The length of catheter that can be inserted indicates where choanal atresia has occurred: shorter distances indicate a problem with the vomer, while longer distances indicate a problem with the posterior choanae. Mucus can be cleared (using suction) to visualise the abnormality.

=== Radiology ===
Diagnosis is confirmed using CT scan.This is also useful for differential diagnosis.

== Treatment ==
=== Airway management ===
As bilateral choanal atresia is an emergency, the airway is secured. A small tube may be placed to the laryngopharynx. Tracheal intubation can also be used. If surgery cannot be performed soon after birth, tracheostomy may have better outcomes.

=== Surgery ===
Surgery may be used to reopen the airway, particularly with bilateral choanal atresia. This may be performed through the nasal cavity or through the palate (accessed through the mouth). A stent may be inserted to keep the newly formed airway patent. Repeated dilatation may be performed. CT guidance may be used.

== Epidemiology ==
Choanal atresia is fairly rare. It may have a frequency between 1 in 7,000 births and 1 in 5,000 births.

== History ==
Choanal atresia was first described by Roederer in 1755.
