= TCOF1 =

Protein-coding gene in the species Homo sapiens

Identifiers
- Aliases: TCOF1, MFD1, TCS, TCS1, treacle, treacle ribosome biogenesis factor 1
- External IDs: OMIM: 606847; MGI: 892003; GeneCards: TCOF1

Gene location (Human)
Chr.	Chromosome 5 (human)
Band	5q32-q33.1	Start	150,357,629 bp
Band	5q32-q33.1	End	150,400,308 bp

Gene location (Mouse)
Chr.	Chromosome 18 (mouse)
Band	18 E1|18 34.41 cM	Start	60,946,827 bp
Band	18 E1|18 34.41 cM	End	60,982,043 bp
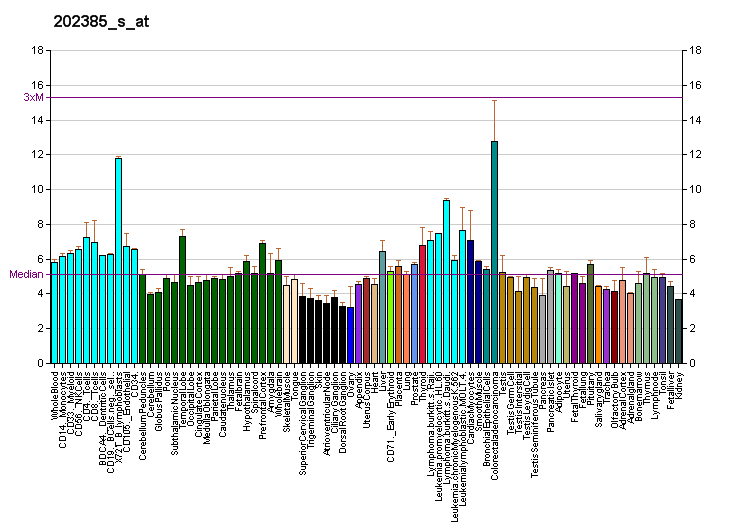

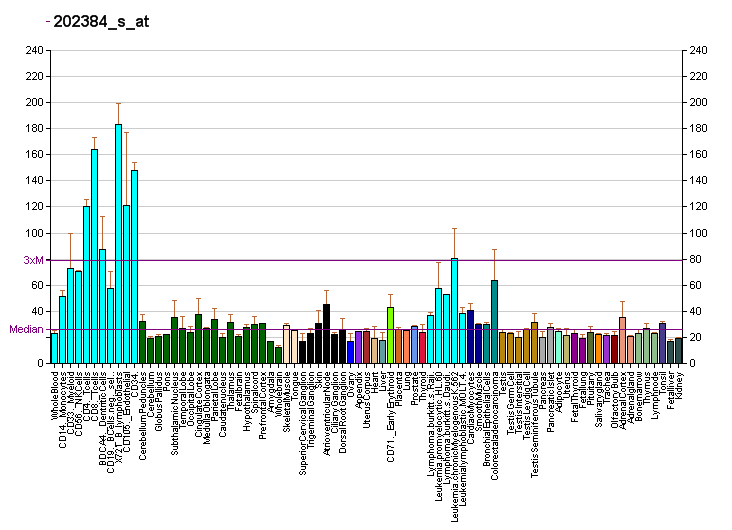
RNA expression pattern
Bgee	Human / Mouse (ortholog); Top expressed in: sural nerve; oocyte; dorsal motor nucleus of vagus nerve; granulocyte; pericardium; lymph node; pylorus; apex of heart; tendon of biceps brachii; gonad / Top expressed in: tail of embryo; internal carotid artery; epiblast; otic vesicle; thymus; external carotid artery; genital tubercle; otic placode; yolk sac; Rostral migratory stream; More reference expression data
BioGPS	More reference expression data
Gene ontology
Molecular function	protein binding; transporter activity; RNA binding; RNA polymerase I core binding; protein heterodimerization activity; scaffold protein binding
Cellular component	nucleolus; nucleus; fibrillar center; cytosol
Biological process	skeletal system development; regulation of translation; neural crest formation; neural crest cell development; transport; nucleolar large rRNA transcription by RNA polymerase I
Sources:Amigo / QuickGO
Orthologs
Databases	NCBI: entry; OMA: entry
Species	Human	Mouse
Entrez	6949	21453
Ensembl	ENSG00000070814	ENSMUSG00000024613
UniProt	Q13428	O08784
RefSeq (mRNA)	NM_000356; NM_001008656; NM_001008657; NM_001135243; NM_001135244 NM_001135245; NM_001195141; NM_001371623	NM_001198984; NM_011552
RefSeq (protein)	NP_000347; NP_001008657; NP_001128715; NP_001128716; NP_001128717 NP_001182070; NP_001358552	NP_001185913; NP_035682
Location (UCSC)	Chr 5: 150.36 – 150.4 Mb	Chr 18: 60.95 – 60.98 Mb
PubMed search
- Wikidata
View/Edit Human	View/Edit Mouse

Treacle Ribosome Biogenesis Factor 1 (TCOF1) also known as Treacle is a protein that in humans is encoded by the TCOF1 gene. TCOF1 encodes a nucleolar protein with an LIS1 homology domain. The treacle protein is involved in rRNA gene transcription through its interaction with upstream binding factor (UBF). Mutations in this gene have been associated with Treacher Collins syndrome, a disorder which includes abnormal craniofacial development. Alternate transcriptional splice variants encoding different isoforms have been found for this gene, but only three of them have been characterized to date.

== Gene ==
The TCOF1 gene is located on the long (q) arm of chromosome 5 between positions 32 and 33.1, from base pair 150,357,629 to base pair 150,400,308.

== Function ==
TCOF1 is involved in the production of a molecule called ribosomal RNA (rRNA) within cells. TCOF1 is active in the nucleolus, which is a small region inside the nucleus where rRNA is produced. As a major component of cell structures called ribosomes, rRNA is essential for the assembly of proteins. This protein is active during early embryonic development in structures that become bones and other tissues in the face. Although the precise function of this protein is unknown, researchers believe that it plays a critical role in the development of facial bones and related structures.

Aside from its interaction with UBF, treacle has been implicated in the methylation of the precursor to mature ribosomal RNA by interaction with the nucleolar protein pNop56.

== Clinical significance ==
More than 120 mutations in the TCOF1 gene have been identified in people with Treacher Collins syndrome. Most of these mutations insert or delete a small number of DNA building blocks (base pairs) in the TCOF1 gene. TCOF1 mutations lead to the production of an abnormally small, nonfunctional version of treacle or prevent the cell from producing this protein. Researchers speculate that a loss of treacle reduces the production of rRNA in parts of the embryo that develop into facial bones and tissues. It is not known how loss of the treacle protein causes the specific problems with facial development found in Treacher Collins syndrome. For instance, mutations in the TCOF gene of these individuals often result in a cleft palate.

== Model organisms ==
Mutations in this gene in Jindo dogs have been associated to the observed cranial differences between Jindo and boxer dogs.
