= CHARGE syndrome =

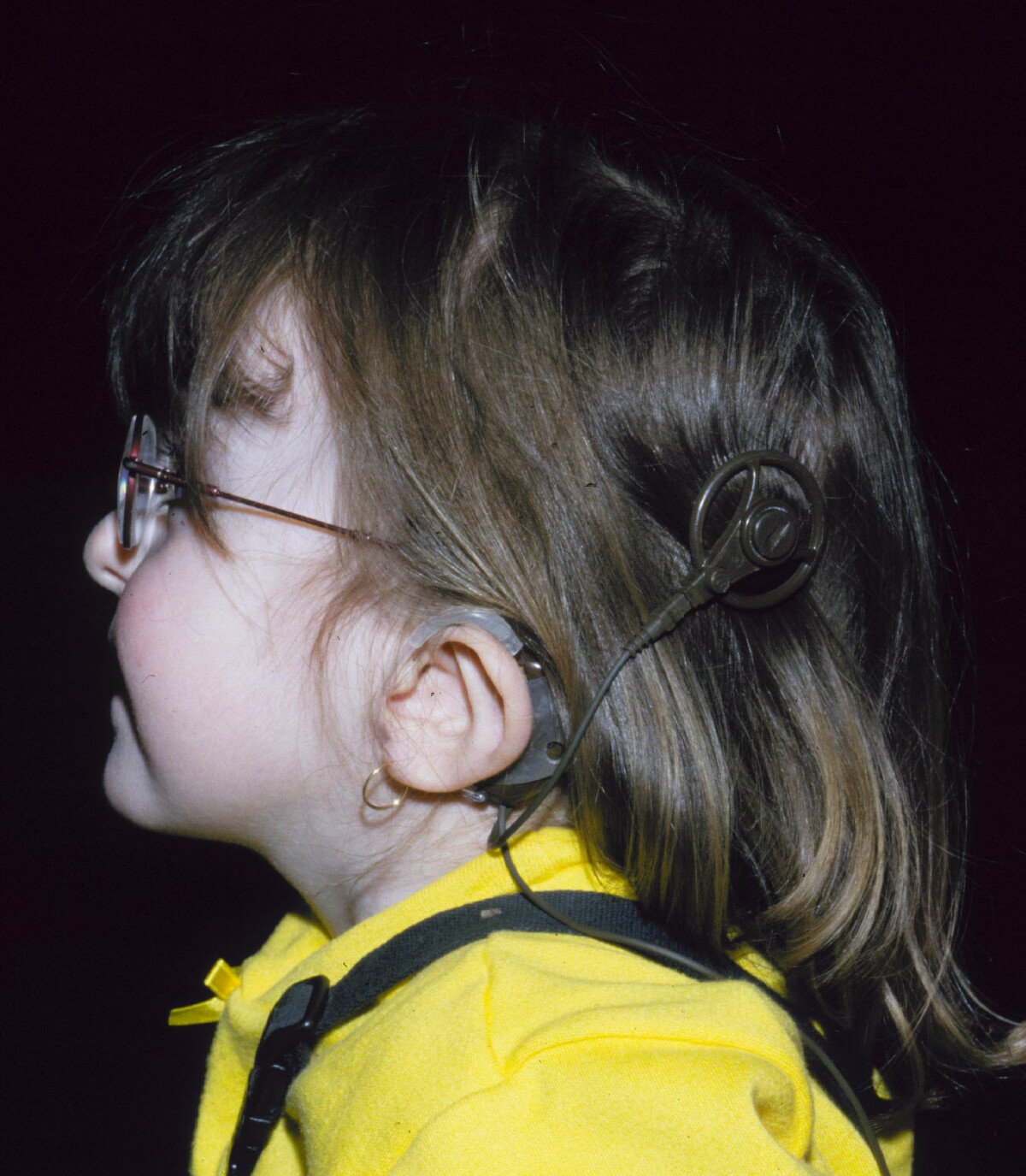
- "Lop ear" phenotype characteristic of a person with CHARGE syndrome, along with her cochlear implant.
- Specialty: Medical genetics
- Differential diagnosis: Moebius syndrome

CHARGE syndrome (formerly known as CHARGE association) is a rare syndrome caused by a genetic disorder. First described in 1979, the acronym "CHARGE" came into use for newborn children with the congenital features of coloboma of the eye, heart defects, atresia of the nasal choanae, restricted growth or development, genital or urinary abnormalities, and ear abnormalities and deafness. These features are no longer used in making a diagnosis of CHARGE syndrome, but the name remains. About two thirds of cases are due to a CHD7 mutation. CHARGE syndrome occurs only in 0.1–1.2 per 10,000 live births; as of 2009, it was the leading cause of congenital deafblindness in the US.

== Genetics ==
CHARGE syndrome was formerly referred to as CHARGE association, which indicates a non-random pattern of congenital anomalies that occurs together more frequently than one would expect on the basis of chance, but for which a common cause has not been identified. Very few people with CHARGE will have 100% of its known features. In 2004, mutations on the CHD7 gene (located on Chromosome 8) were found in 10 of 17 patients in the Netherlands, making CHARGE an official syndrome. A 2006 US study of 110 individuals with CHARGE syndrome showed that 60% of those tested had a mutation of the CHD7 gene.

In 2010, a review of 379 clinically diagnosed cases of CHARGE syndrome, in which CHD7 mutation testing was undertaken found that 67% of cases were due to a CHD7 mutation.

== Diagnosis ==
The diagnosis of CHARGE syndrome is often difficult, because it is rare. The syndrome spans many disciplines, and as such, the symptoms may be recognized by a pediatrician, family medicine physician, oral and maxillofacial surgeon, ENT specialist, ophthalmologist/optometrist, endocrinologist, cardiologist, urologist, developmental specialist, radiologist, geneticist, physiotherapist, occupational therapist, speech therapist, or orthopedic specialist.

=== Signs ===
Although genetic testing positively identifies nearly two thirds of children with CHARGE syndrome, diagnosis is still largely clinical. The following signs were originally identified in children with this syndrome, but are no longer used to make the diagnosis alone.

- C – Coloboma of the eye, central nervous system anomalies
- H – Heart defects
- A – Atresia of the choanae
- R – Restricted growth and/or development
- G – Genital and/or urinary defects (hypogonadism, undescended testicles, besides hypospadias)
- E – Ear anomalies and/or deafness and abnormally bowl-shaped and concave ears, known as "lop ears".

A high percentage of children with CHARGE syndrome can be considered deafblind, so they must receive a specific educational methodology for deafblindness.

=== Genetic testing ===
Genetic testing for CHARGE syndrome involves specific genetic testing for the CHD7 gene. The test is available at most major genetic testing laboratories. Insurance companies sometimes do not pay for such genetic tests, though this is changing rapidly as genetic testing is becoming standard across all aspects of medicine. CHARGE syndrome is a clinical diagnosis, which means genetic testing is not required in order to make the diagnosis. Rather, the diagnosis can be made based on clinical features alone.

=== Screening other organ systems ===
Once the diagnosis is made based on clinical signs, it is important to investigate other body systems that may be involved. For example, if the diagnosis is made based on the abnormal appearance of the ears and developmental delay, it is important to check the child's hearing, vision, heart, nose, and urogenital system. Ideally, every child newly diagnosed with CHARGE syndrome should have a complete evaluation by an ENT specialist, audiologist, ophthalmologist, pediatric cardiologist, developmental therapist, and pediatric urologist.

Recent research led by Yu Liang from Shijiazhuang Fourth Hospital and Sijie He from BGI Genomics, highlighted the use of prenatal ultrasound to detect CHARGE syndrome. Key findings indicated the difficulty in diagnosing CHARGE syndrome without genetic testing, as mutations in the CHD7 gene are not always listed in public databases. and predicted to be deleterious by CADD and MutationTaster.

Phenotypic variability further complicates diagnosis, with no clear correlation between mutation severity and clinical presentation. Trio-WES analysis confirmed a de novo mutation in the newborn, emphasizing the importance of early diagnosis for effective management. The study underscores the significance of early prenatal diagnosis through ultrasound examinations and specialized genetic testing. This approach facilitates timely interventions and enhances understanding of rare genetic conditions, improving diagnostic protocols for CHARGE syndrome and similar disorders.

== Treatment ==
Children with CHARGE syndrome may have a number of life-threatening medical conditions; with advances in medical care, these children can survive and can thrive with the support of a multidisciplinary team of medical professionals. Therapies and education must take into consideration hearing impairment, vision problems, and any others. Early intervention, such as occupational, speech-language, and physical therapy, to improve static posture, ambulation, and self-care skills is important. The intelligence of children with multiple health impairments, such as combined deafblindness, can be underestimated in the absence of early intervention.

=== Education ===
Children with CHARGE syndrome will vary greatly in their abilities in the classroom: some may need little support, while some may require full-time support and individualized programs. Taking each of the various affected body systems into account is vital to the success of the child in the educational setting.

An important step in dealing with abnormal behavior is understanding why it is occurring and helping the child learn more appropriate methods of communicating.

== Epidemiology ==
The incidence is estimated to range from 0.1 to 1.2 per 10,000 live births, though the true incidence is unknown. As of 2005, the highest prevalence was found in Canada and estimated at 1 in 8,500 live births.

== History ==
The first case of CHARGE syndrome was diagnosed at the Children's Hospital of Philadelphia (CHOP). B.D. Hall first described the CHARGE association in a 1979 journal paper of about 17 children who had been born with choanal atresia. During the same year, H.M. Hittner described 10 children who had choanal atresia as well as coloboma, congenital heart defect, and hearing loss. Using both coloboma or choanal atresia and some of the other related characteristic malformations, R. A. Pagon first coined the acronym CHARGE in 1981 to emphasize that this cluster of associated malformations occurred together. It came to be recognised as a syndrome within the umbrella of the CHARGE association, a set of apparently random signs occurring together. Since the signs seen in CHARGE are caused by a genetic anomaly, its name was eventually changed to 'CHARGE syndrome'.

The CHARGE Syndrome Foundation, formally incorporated in 1993, is a US-based organization for individuals with CHARGE syndrome, families, researchers, and clinicians to further research and scientific knowledge about CHARGE Syndrome. The Foundation holds a biennial international conference that was first held in 1993.

== See also ==
- List of syndromes
- Characteristics of syndromic ASD conditions
