= Coloboma =

Hole in one of the structures of the eye

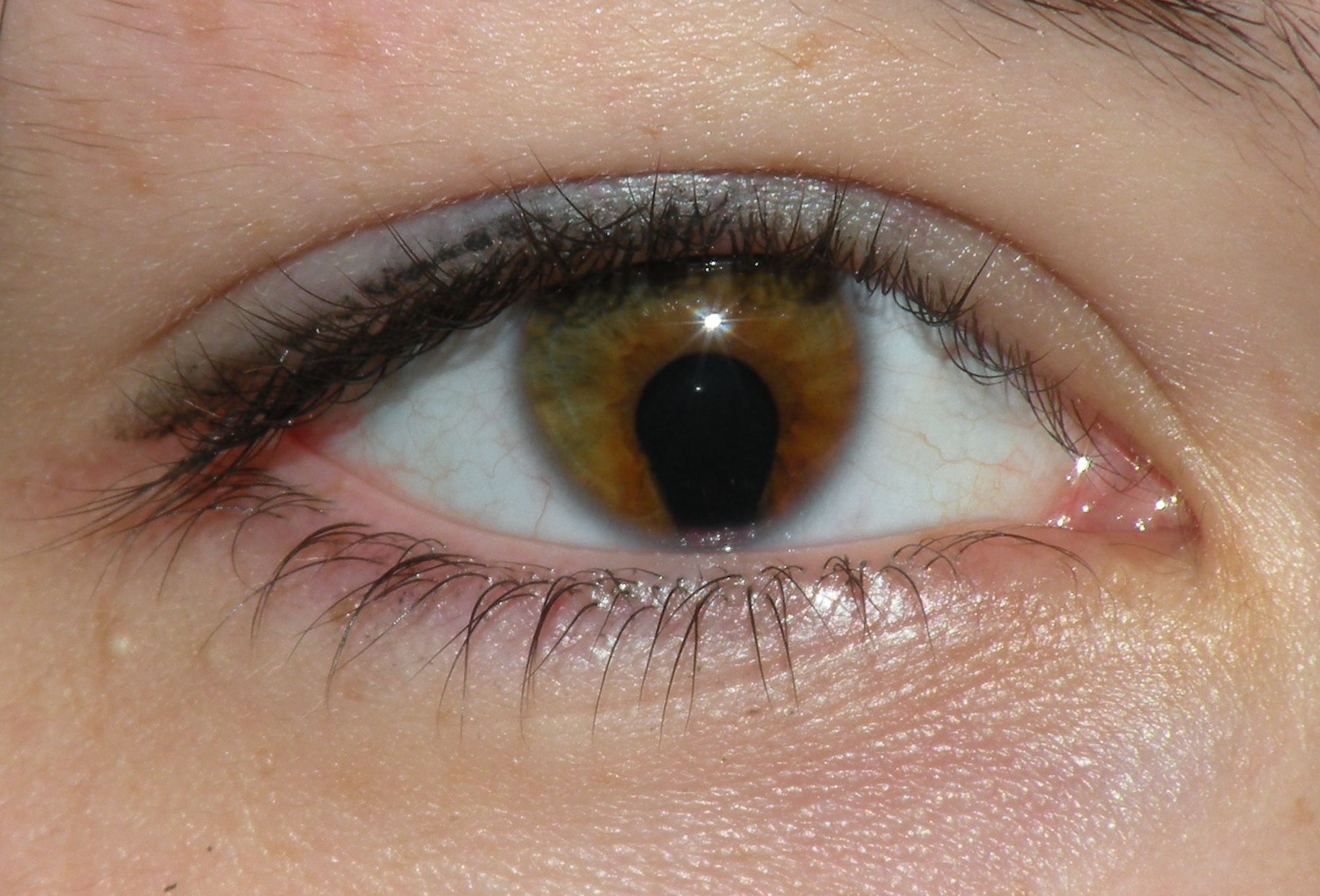
- Coloboma in a 16-year-old female
- Specialty: Ophthalmology

A coloboma (from the Greek κολόβωμα, meaning "defect") is a hole in one of the structures of the eye, such as the iris, retina, choroid, or optic disc. The hole is present from birth and can be caused when a gap called the choroid fissure, which is present during early stages of prenatal development, fails to close up completely before a child is born. Ocular coloboma is relatively uncommon, affecting less than one in every 10,000 births.

The classical description in medical literature is of a keyhole-shaped defect. A coloboma can occur in one eye (unilateral) or both eyes (bilateral). Most cases of coloboma affect only the iris. The level of vision impairment of those with a coloboma can range from having no vision problems to being able to see only light or dark, depending on the position and extent of the coloboma (or colobomata if more than one is present).

== Signs and symptoms ==
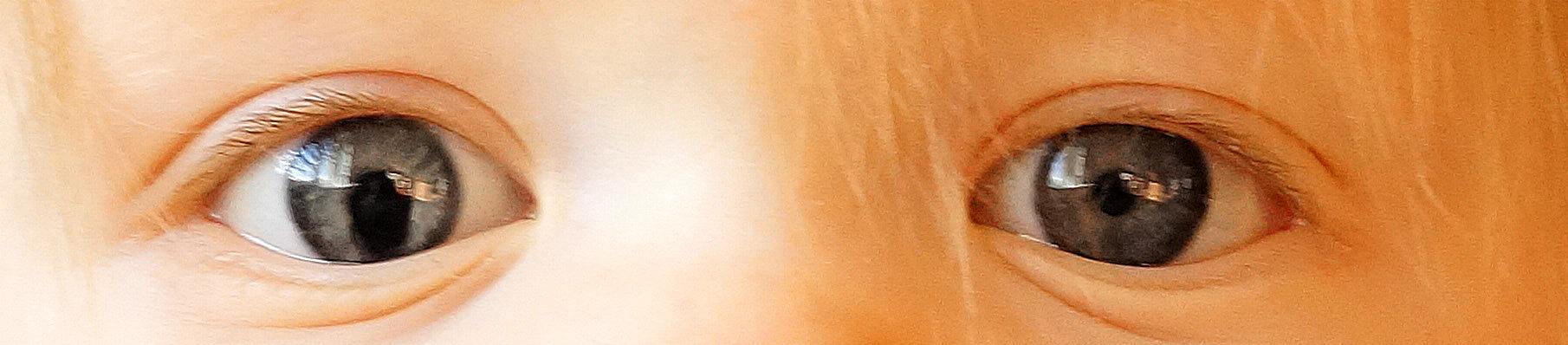
Iris coloboma in the right eye of a 10-month-old child. The pupil cannot contract to a smaller size than pictured, but may still be able to dilate in low light.

Visual effects may be mild to more severe depending on the size and location of the coloboma. If, for example, only a small part of the iris is missing, the vision may be normal; when a large part of the retina or (especially) optic nerve is missing, the vision may be poor. Commonly posterior colobomata affect the inferior retina, with resultant deficit in the superior visual field. Other conditions can be associated with a coloboma. Sometimes, the eye may be reduced in size, a condition called microphthalmia. Glaucoma, nystagmus, scotoma, or strabismus may also occur.

=== Related conditions ===
Other ocular malformations that include coloboma or are related to it:

- CHARGE syndrome, a term that came into use as an acronym for the set of unusual congenital features seen in a number of newborn children. The letters stand for: coloboma of the eye, heart defects, atresia of the nasal choanae, retardation of growth and/or development, genital and/or urinary abnormalities, and ear abnormalities and deafness. Although these features are no longer used in making a diagnosis, the name has remained.
- Cat eye syndrome, caused by the short arm (p) and a small section of the long arm (q) of human chromosome 22 being present three (trisomic) or four times (tetrasomic) instead of the usual two times. The term "cat eye" was coined because of the particular appearance of the vertical colobomas in the eyes of some patients.
- Patau syndrome (trisomy 13), a chromosomal abnormality that can cause a number of deformities, some of which include structural eye defects, including microphthalmia, Peters anomaly, cataract, iris and/or fundus coloboma, retinal dysplasia or retinal detachment, sensory nystagmus, cortical visual loss, and optic nerve hypoplasia.
- Treacher Collins syndrome, autosomal dominant syndrome caused by mutation of TCOF1. Coloboma is part of a set of characteristic facies that features craniofacial malformations, such as downslanting eyes, ear anomalies, or hypoplasia of zygomatic bone and jaw (micrognathia).
- Tilted disc syndrome, an unusual congenital malformation associated with myopic astigmatism characterized by tilting of the intraocular tip of the optic nerve (the optic disc), also known as Fuchs coloboma.

== Cause ==
Coloboma can be associated with a mutation in the PAX2 gene. Eye abnormalities have been shown to occur in over 90% of children with fetal alcohol syndrome.

== Diagnosis ==
Typically a coloboma appears oval- or comet-shaped with round end towards the centre. There may be a few vessels (retinal or choroidal) at the edges. The surface may have irregular depression.

== Treatment ==
Coloboma of the iris may be treated in a number of ways. A simple cosmetic solution is a specialized cosmetic contact lens with an artificial pupil aperture. Surgical repair of the iris defect is also possible. Surgeons can close the defect by stitching in some cases. Vision can be improved with glasses, contact lenses or even laser eye surgery but may be limited if the retina is affected or there is amblyopia.

== Epidemiology ==
The number of cases is around 5 to 7 per 100,000 births, making it a relatively rare condition.

== Society and culture ==
Notable people with coloboma include actor John Ritter, model/actress Karolina Wydra, The New York Times columnist Andrew Ross Sorkin, pop singer songwriter Lachi, U.S. Olympic medalist Stephen Nedoroscik, George Soros, and YouTuber Courtney Miller. Madeleine McCann, a young girl who went missing in Portugal in 2007, does not have the condition. She has a freckle under her pupil. Her unique eye was a large part of her parents' media appeal to find her.
