= List of congenital disorders =

List of congenital disorders

== Numerical ==
- 47,XXY - see Klinefelter syndrome
- 5p syndrome - see Cri du chat syndrome

== A ==
- Acrania
- Achondroplasia
- Acrocephalosyndactyly
  - Apert syndrome
  - Crouzon syndrome
  - Pfeiffer syndrome
- Acrorenal mandibular syndrome
- Agenesis of the corpus callosum
- Albinism
- Amelia and hemimelia
- Amniotic band syndrome
- Anencephaly
- Angelman syndrome
- Aposthia (inborn circumcision)
- Arrhinia
- Arnold–Chiari malformation

== B ==
- Bannayan–Zonana syndrome
- Bardet–Biedl syndrome
- Barth syndrome
- Basal-cell nevus syndrome
- Beckwith–Wiedemann syndrome
- Benjamin syndrome
- Bladder exstrophy
- Bloom syndrome
- Brachydactyly

== C ==
- Cat eye syndrome
- Caudal regression syndrome
- Cebocephaly
- Cerebral Gigantism
- CHARGE syndrome
- Chromosome 16 abnormalities
- Chromosome 18 abnormalities
- Chromosome 20 abnormalities
- Chromosome 22 abnormalities
- Cleft lip/palate
- Cleidocranial dysostosis
- Club foot
- Congenital adrenal hyperplasia (CAH)
- Congenital central hypoventilation syndrome
- Congenital diaphragmatic hernia (CDH)
- Congenital Disorder of Glycosylation (CDG)
- Congenital hydrocephalus
- Congenital hyperinsulinism
- Congenital insensitivity to pain with anhidrosis (CIPA)
- Congenital pulmonary airway malformation (CPAM)
- Conjoined twins
- Costello syndrome
- Craniopagus parasiticus
- Craniosynostosis
- Cri du chat syndrome
- Cyclopia
- Cystic fibrosis

== D ==
- De Lange syndrome
- DiGeorge syndrome
- Diphallia
- Diprosopus
- Distal trisomy 10q
- Down syndrome
- Dwarfism

== E ==
- Ectodermal dysplasia
- Ectopia cordis
- Ectrodactyly
- Edwards syndrome
- Encephalocele
- Epidermolysis bullosa
- Ethmocephaly
- Exencephaly

== F ==
- Fetal alcohol syndrome
- Fetal hydantoin syndrome
- Fetofetal transfusion
- First arch syndrome
- Freeman–Sheldon syndrome

== G ==
- Gastroschisis
- Genu recurvatum
- Goldenhar syndrome

== H ==
- Harlequin-type ichthyosis
- Heart disorders (Congenital heart defects)
- Hemifacial microsomia
- Holoprosencephaly
- Huntington's disease
- Hirschsprung's disease, or congenital aganglionic megacolon
- Hypertrichosis
- Hypoglossia
- Hypomelanism or hypomelanosis (albinism)
- Hypospadias
- Haemophilia
- Heterochromia
- Hemochromatosis
- Hypertelorism
- Hypotelorism

== I ==
- Imperforate anus
- Imperforate hymen
- Incontinentia pigmenti
- Iniencephaly
- Intestinal neuronal dysplasia
- Ivemark syndrome

== J ==
- Jacobsen syndrome

== K ==
- Kallmann syndrome
- Katz syndrome
- Klinefelter syndrome
- Klippel-Feil syndrome
- Kabuki syndrome
- Kyphosis

== L ==
- Larsen syndrome
- Laurence–Moon syndrome
- Lissencephaly
- Lordosis

== M ==
- Macrocephaly
- Marfan syndrome
- Megalencephaly
- Microcephaly
- Micromelia
- Microtia
- Moebius syndrome
- Monosomy 9p
- Myasthenic syndrome
- Myelokathexis

== N ==
- Nager's Syndrome
- Nail–patella syndrome
- Neonatal jaundice
- Neurofibromatosis
- Neuronal ceroid lipofuscinosis
- Noonan syndrome
- Nystagmus

== O ==
- Ochoa syndrome
- Oculocerebrorenal syndrome
- Oligodactyly
- Osteogenesis imperfecta
- Otocephaly

== P ==
- Pallister–Killian syndrome
- Pancreaticobiliary maljunction
- Patau syndrome
- Pectus excavatum
- Pectus carinatum
- Phocomelia
- Pierre Robin syndrome
- Poland syndrome
- Polydactyly
- Polymelia
- Polysyndactyly
- Prader–Willi syndrome
- Primordial dwarfism
- Proteus syndrome
- Prune belly syndrome

== R ==
- Radial aplasia
- Rett syndrome
- Robinow syndrome
- Rubinstein–Taybi syndrome

== S ==
- Saethre–Chotzen syndrome
- Schizencephaly
- Scoliosis
- Seckel syndrome
- Sickle cell disease
- Sirenomelia
- Situs inversus
- Smith–Lemli–Opitz syndrome
- Smith–Magenis syndrome
- Spina bifida
- Stickler Syndrome
- Strabismus
- Sturge–Weber syndrome
- Symbrachydactyly
- Syndactyly
- Syphilis, congenital

== T ==
- Teratoma
- Thanatophoric dysplasia
- Thoracoschisis
- Treacher Collins syndrome
- Trichothiodystrophy
- Triple-X syndrome
- Trisomy 9
- Turner syndrome

== U ==
- Umbilical hernia
- Usher syndrome

== W ==
- Waardenburg syndrome
- Warkany syndrome
- Werner syndrome
- Williams syndrome
- Wolf–Hirschhorn syndrome
- Wolff–Parkinson–White syndrome
- West syndrome

== X ==
- XYY syndrome

== See also ==
- Birth defect
- List of genetic disorders
- List of ICD-9 codes 740–759: congenital anomalies
- List of syndromes
- Rare disease
