= 13q deletion syndrome =

- 13q deletion syndrome is inherited in an autosomal dominant manner

13q deletion syndrome is a rare genetic disease caused by the deletion of some or all of the large arm of human chromosome 13. Depending upon the size and location of the deletion on chromosome 13, the physical and mental manifestations will vary. It has the potential to cause intellectual disability and congenital malformations that affect a variety of organ systems. Because of the rarity of the disease in addition to the variations in the disease, the specific genes that cause this disease are unknown. This disease is also known as:

- 13q- Syndrome, Partial,
- Deletion 13q Syndrome, Partial
- Monosomy 13q, Partial
- Partial Monosomy of the Long Arm of Chromosome 13

== Signs and symptoms ==
Variations of the signs and symptoms occur depending upon the area of chromosome 13 that is deleted. Deletions from the centromere to 13q32 or any deletions including the 13q32 band are associated with slow growth, intellectual disability, and congenital malformations. Deletions from 13q33 to the end of the chromosome are associated with intellectual disability. Intellectual disabilities range from very mild to very severe, and can co-occur with behavioral disorders and/or autism spectrum disorders.

At birth, the main symptoms include low weight (due to intrauterine growth restriction), hypotonia, and feeding difficulties. Infants may also have cleft palate.

13q deletion syndrome gives a characteristic appearance to affected individuals, potentially including microphthalmia (small eyes), hypertelorism (wide-set eyes), thin forehead, high palate, underdeveloped midface, small mouth, small nose, broad, flat nasal bridge, short neck, low hairline, irregular or wrongly positioned teeth, low-set ears, micrognathia (small jaw), tooth enamel defects, short stature, microcephaly (small head), a prominent, long philtrum, and earlobes turned inwards.

Congenital heart disease is also associated with 13q deletion syndrome. Common defects include atrial septal defect, tetralogy of Fallot, ventricular septal defect, patent ductus arteriosus, pulmonary stenosis, and coarctation of the aorta. Defects of the endocrine system, digestive system, and genitourinary system are also common. These include underdevelopment or agenesis of the pancreas, adrenal glands, thymus, gallbladder, and thyroid; Hirschsprung's disease; gastric reflux, imperforate anus, retention testis, ectopic kidney, renal agenesis, and hydronephrosis.

A variety of brain abnormalities are also associated with 13q deletion. They can include epilepsy, craniosynostosis (premature closing of the skull bones), spastic diplegia, cerebral hypotrophy, underdevelopment or agenesis of the corpus callosum, cerebellar hypoplasia, deafness, and, rarely, hydrocephalus, Dandy–Walker syndrome, and spina bifida. The eyes can be severely damaged and affected individuals may be blind. They may also have coloboma of the iris or choroid, strabismus, nystagmus, glaucoma, or cataracts.

Other skeletal malformations are found with 13q deletion syndrome, including syndactyly, clubfoot, clinodactyly, and malformations of the vertebrae and/or thumbs.

Deletions that include the 13q32 band, which contains the brain development gene ZIC2, are associated with holoprosencephaly; they are also associated with hand and foot malformations. Deletions that include the 13q14 band, which contains the tumor suppressor gene Rb, are associated with a higher risk of developing retinoblastoma, which is more common in XY children. Deletion of the 13q33.3 band is associated with hypospadias. Other genes in the potentially affected region include NUFIP1, HTR2A, PDCH8, and PCDH17.

In males with 13q deletion syndrome, genital abnormalities are common. The meatus, or urinary opening, may appear on the underside of the penis (hypospadis), and/or the testes will not descend into the scrotum (cryptochidism). The scrotum will often be unusually small or abnormally divided into two sections (bifid scrotum); the penis may be unusually small (micropenis), and/or abnormal passage may be present between the scrotum and the anus (perineal fistula). In rare cases, the anal opening may be absent or covered by a thin membrane which can cause obstruction (anal atresia).

== Causes ==
Although one can inherit 13q deletion syndrome, the most common way to obtain the disease is through genetic mutations. All human chromosomes have 2 arms, the p (short) arm and the q (long) arm. They are separated from each other only by a primary constriction, the centromere, the point at which the chromosome is attached to the spindle during cell division.

== Mechanism ==
This disorder is caused by the deletion of the long arm of chromosome 13, which can either be deleted linearly or as a ring chromosome. It is typically not hereditary— the loss of a portion of the chromosome typically occurs during gametogenesis, making it a de novo mutation. When it is hereditary, it is usually caused by a parent having mosaicism or a balanced translocation. The severity of the disorder is correlated with the size of the deletion, with larger deletions causing more severe manifestations. There are three common anomalies predominately observed in 13q deletion syndrome: congenital heart disease, anorectal/genitourinary, and gastrointestinal tract malformations. These are all part of the VACTERL associations which is a disorder that is characterized by vertebral anomalies, anal atresia, cardiac defect, tracheoesphageal fistula, renal anomalies, and limb defects.

== Diagnosis ==
13q deletion syndrome can only be definitively diagnosed by genetic analysis, which can be done prenatally or after birth. Family and medical history is important when diagnosing a child with 13q deletion syndrome. Chromosome testing of both parents can provide more information on whether or not the deletion was inherited. Increased nuchal translucency in a first-trimester ultrasound may indicate the presence of 13q deletion. It is important to follow through with genetic testing because there are many other diseases that have similar clinical manifestations of 13q deletion syndrome.

== Treatment ==
Although there is no cure for 13q deletion syndrome, symptoms can be managed, usually with the involvement of a neurologist, rehabilitation physician, occupational therapist, physiotherapist, psychotherapist, nutritionist, special education professional, and/or speech therapist. No treatment for 13q deletion syndrome will ever be identical due to the variations in the disease which is why the use of personalized teams with members from different medical fields is vital to the patient. If the affected child's growth is particularly slow, growth hormone treatment can be used to augment growth. Plastic surgeries can repair cleft palates, and surgical repair or monitoring by a pediatric cardiologist can manage cardiac defects. Some skeletal, neurological, genitourinary, gastrointestinal, and ophthalmic abnormalities can be definitively treated with surgery. Endocrine abnormalities can often be managed medically. Even if a child is responding to well to their medical treatment, it is important to utilize special educators, speech and occupational therapists, and physiotherapists to help the child develop skills that will aid in their life in and out of the classroom.

== Prognosis ==
Affected individuals may have a somewhat shortened lifespan without treatment. The maximum lifespan without treatment is 67 years. When a 13q deletion is detected, such as in a bone marrow biopsy for Multiple Myeloma, chemo treatments in recent years have the ability to extend life expectancy without limitations depending on response to treatments. It is not uncommon for adults with 13q deletion syndrome to need support services to maintain their activities of daily living, including adult day care services or housing services.

== Epidemiology ==
It is incredibly rare, with fewer than 190 cases described. Although rare, deletions involving chromosome 13q are among the most commonly observed monosomies. Chromosome 13, Partial Monosomy 13q appears to affect females slightly more frequently than males. Since the disorder was originally reported in 1963, more than 125 cases have been recorded in the medical literature. The age of onset can vary from patient to patient because of the differences in deletions. For example, a study was able to demonstrate for the first time that a patient with a hemangioendothelioma of the liver with a simultaneous deletion in chromosome 13q of 28Mb did not develop Rb until the age of 3 years while other patients with similar deletions have immediate clinical manifestations upon birth.

== History ==
13q deletion syndrome was first described in 1963 and fully characterized in 1971.
