= 18p- =

Deletion of the short arm of chromosome 18

- Other names: Monosomy 18p, deletion 18p syndrome, del(18p) syndrome, partial monosomy 18p, de Grouchy syndrome 1
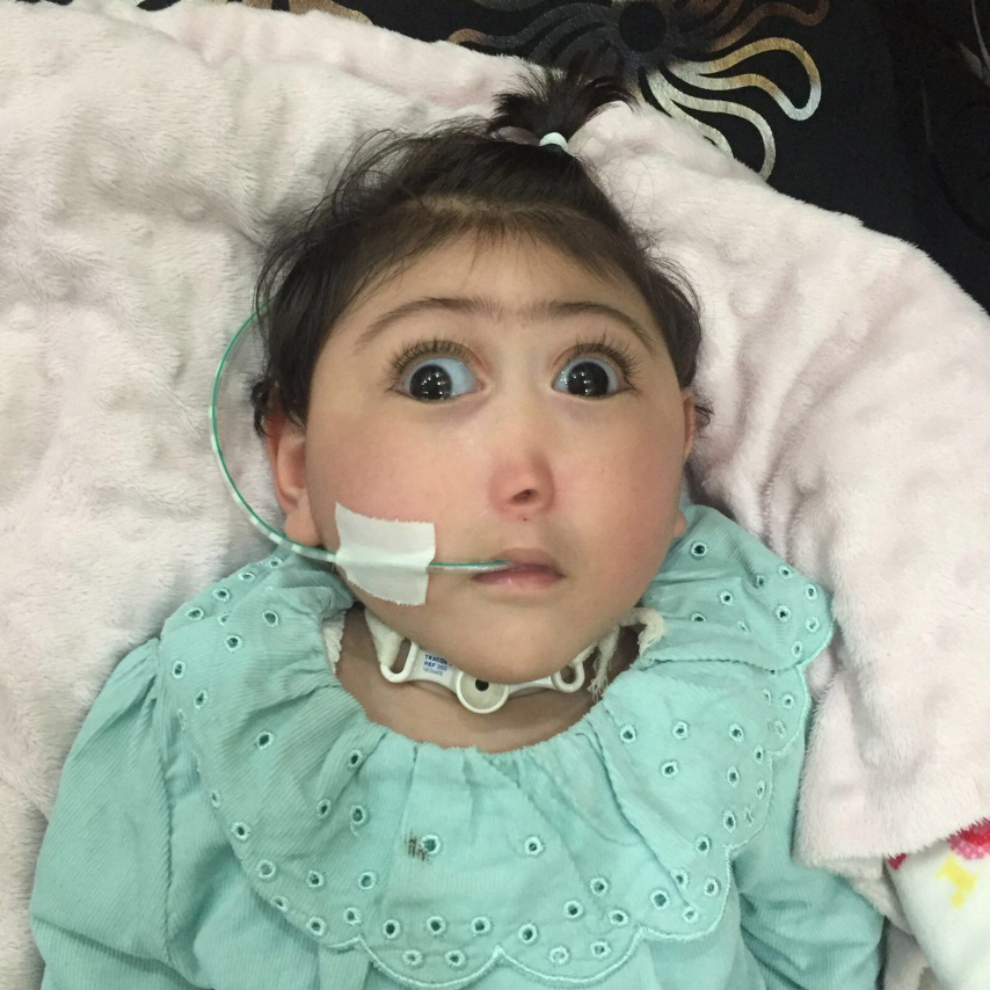
- 4-month-old girl with cebocephaly as a result of 18p-
- Specialty: Medical genetics
- Frequency: 0.005%

18p-, also known as monosomy 18p, deletion 18p syndrome, del(18p) syndrome, partial monosomy 18p, or de Grouchy syndrome 1, is a genetic condition caused by a deletion of all or part of the short arm (the p arm) of chromosome 18. It occurs in about 1 of every 50,000 births.

Patients typically have petite frames, a short neck, and a distinctive stance. They may have mild microcephaly, a round, flat, expressionless face, a broad, flat nasal bridge, horizontal palpebral fissures, epicanthal folds, strabismus, and ptosis of the eyelids. The syndrome can lead to muscle hypotonia and a slowdown in activity and movements. Mental impairment is common, with an average intelligence quotient (IQ) ranging from 25 to 75. Holoprosencephaly (HPE) is the primary abnormality, characterized by aberrant development of the midface and forebrain. Severe brain anomalies are linked to facial traits, while milder variants may have minor facial abnormalities. Skeletal abnormalities, such as coxa vara, hip dislocation, scoliosis, and foot deformities, have been documented. Growth hormone (GH) insufficiency is often detected in individuals with short stature, and serum immunoglobulin A levels may be low or absent. Other conditions include alopecia areata, hypotrichosis simplex, and keratosis pilaris and ulerythema ophryogenes.

Cytogenetic study is crucial for a definitive diagnosis of 18p deletion syndrome, as phenotype alone cannot support the diagnosis. Typically, peripheral blood karyotype analysis is used, and can also come from trophoblast cells or amniocytes during the perinatal stage. Different syndromes, like Turner syndrome or trisomy 21, may be associated with 18p deletion.

Deletion 18p syndrome has no specific treatment but is often treated with speech therapy and physical therapy for hypotonia. Severe brain abnormalities lead to poor prognosis and neonatal death, while patients without severe abnormalities have a better chance of survival. Early rehabilitative and educational interventions are recommended.

== Signs and symptoms ==
18p- causes a wide range of medical and developmental concerns. There is significant variation in severity. This variation is due to the variability of the deletion size and breakpoints.

Patients typically have petite frames, a short neck, and a distinctive stance in which they lean slightly forward while standing with their legs spread wide. There can be mild microcephaly present. Important traits include a round, flat, and expressionless face, a broad, flat nasal bridge, horizontal palpebral fissures, epicanthal folds, strabismus, and, when present, mostly ptosis of the eyelids. Ptosis may need to be surgically corrected and can be unilateral or bilateral. The lower lip is frequently everted, the mouth is large, the philtrum is somewhat short and projecting, and Cupid's bow is blunted with a flat upper lip. The palate may be highly arched, the lateral incisors are occasionally absent, and the poorly positioned teeth have severe caries. In children, the chin is little and somewhat receding; in adults, it becomes normal or even protrudes. Large and floppy, with disconnected pinnae and a hypoplastic anthelix, the ears are frequently low-set and turned posteriorly. The hands lack distinctive dermatoglyphics and are broad and short with phalanges that decline in width. Often indicative of Turner syndrome are a large chest with widely separated nipples or pectus excavatum, a short, occasionally webbed neck, and a low posterior hair line. Muscle hypotonia is a common condition. In most situations, puberty is normal, and conception is conceivable.

Mental impairment is common. Although some individuals have been found to have normal or borderline mental development, the average intelligence quotient (IQ) ranges from 25 to 75, with most cases falling between 50 and 75. Verbal and motor abilities are often greatly dissociated, and speech delay is common. There has been a noticeable slowdown in activity and movements. Sometimes, behavioral traits like schizophrenia or autism exacerbate the mental illness. Rarely are convulsive fits or electroencephalographic (EEG) abnormalities seen.

Holoprosencephaly (HPE), the primary abnormality, is characterized by aberrant development of the midface and forebrain and is linked to a wide range of phenotypes. Ten to fifteen percent of deletion 18p syndrome sufferers have severe brain anomalies linked to facial traits as cyplopia, cebocephaly, premaxillary agenesis, and bilateral cleft lip and palate. In milder variants, there may or may not be a brain abnormality present along with minor facial abnormalities such as flat nasal bridge, hypo- or hypertelorism, agenesis of the corpus callosum, and absence of the olfactory pathways and bulbs. In 18p-syndrome, a single central maxillary incisor has frequently been reported as an abortive type of holoprosencephaly.

Numerous skeletal abnormalities, including coxa vara, hip dislocation, scoliosis and/or kyphosis, and foot deformities, have been documented. On rare occasions, males may have cryptorchidism and genital hypoplasia with a small penis. About 10% of individuals had cardiac anomalies, which seemed to be a very uncommon occurrence, with situs abnormalities occurring in few situations. Rarely or sporadically, a number of other abnormalities have been documented, most frequently for deletion 18p due to an imbalanced translocation and concurrent partial trisomy.

Growth hormone (GH) insufficiency is often detected in people with short stature, which may support GH treatment. Serum immunoglobulin A (IgA) levels may be low or absent. There have been reports of juvenile diabetes, thyrotoxicosis, thyroiditis resulting in insufficiency, and other auto-immune illnesses.

There have been reports of alopecia areata, hypotrichosis simplex, and other uncommon cutaneous conditions like keratosis pilaris and ulerythema ophryogenes. A movement disorder called dystonia can manifest in early adulthood.

== Causes ==
A single chromosome 18's short arm may be absent entirely or in part, resulting in deletion 18p syndrome. To find out if one parent has the unbalanced 18p- deletion or is a balanced translocation carrier, it is necessary to examine their parental karyotypes. About two thirds of cases include de novo deletions.

In majority of the other cases that have been documented, the cause is an imbalanced whole arm translocation, which typically takes place between the long arms of acrocentric and chr 18 chromosomes, giving rise to a karyotype with 45 chromosomes. Additional erasures 18p are the result of a partial trisomy for another chromosome and the malsegregation of a balanced paternal translocation with a variable breakpoint on 18p. Subtelomeric screening has revealed certain cryptic subtelomeric deletions or translocations.

There have been at least six occurrences of documented familial transmission of 18p- from one parent to the kid, the majority of which included a maternal transfer.

Sometimes 18p is deleted as part of the ring 18 chromosome, and other times it results from recombination in a pericentric inversion that causes an 18p monosomy linked to an 18q trisomy.

== Diagnosis ==
A definitive diagnosis of 18p deletion syndrome requires cytogenetic study, as the phenotype alone cannot be used to support the diagnosis. Typically, peripheral blood karyotype analysis is used to make the diagnosis. It can also come from trophoblast cells or amniocytes during the perinatal stage.

Many different syndromes that manifest as low stature and moderate mental impairment may be included in the differential diagnosis. Turner syndrome or trisomy 21 may be loosely associated with 18p deletion in young children. Cytogenetic analysis always enables the correct diagnosis.

== Treatment ==
Like other chromosomal diseases, deletion 18p syndrome has no known specific treatment; however, since most patients experience significant speech issues and difficulties with speech articulation, early rehabilitative and educational interventions, primarily speech therapy, are advised. For hypotonia, physical therapy is often suggested.

== Outlook ==
Patients with severe brain abnormalities typically have a poor prognosis and die during the neonatal period. When severe abnormalities are absent, patients with the most prevalent form of deletion 18p syndrome do not appear to have a worse chance of survival.

== Epidemiology ==
18p- occurs about once in 50,000 live births, with a female to male ratio of 3:2.
