= Cebocephaly =

Form of holoprosencephaly resulting in a single nostril

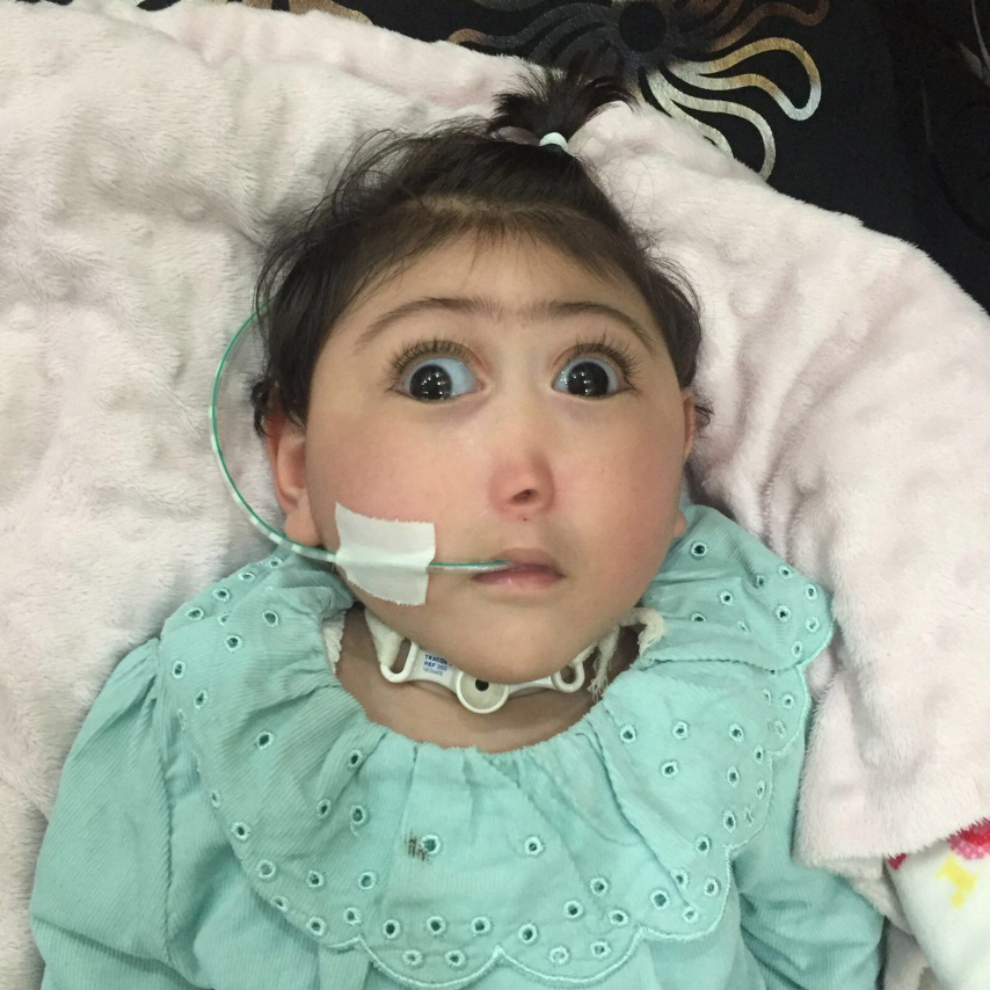
- Cebocephaly in a 4-month-old girl as a result of 18p-
- Symptoms: Close-set eyes, flat nose, single nostril
- Causes: Genetic conditions, some vertically transmitted infections
- Diagnostic method: Before birth: ultrasound After birth: symptoms, CT scan
- Prognosis: Poor (high mortality)
- Frequency: 1 in 40,000 deliveries

Cebocephaly (from Greek kebos, "monkey" + kephale, "head") is a developmental anomaly that is part of a group of defects called holoprosencephaly. Cebocephaly involves the presence of two separate eyes set close together and a small, flat nose with a single nostril (no nasal septum). It may be diagnosed before or after birth. It has a very poor prognosis, with most affected infants dying soon after birth. It is very rare, having been estimated to affect around 1 in 40,000 deliveries.

== Signs and symptoms ==
Cebocephaly causes:

- two separate eyes set close together
- a small, flat nose with a single nostril
- ear abnormalities
- mouth abnormalities (such as microstomia)

The presence of a nasal septum precludes a diagnosis of cebocephaly. Cebocephaly may cause malformations of the sphenoid and ethmoid bones behind the orbit.

== Cause ==
Cebocephaly can be caused by many factors, particularly genetic variations. These include 18p-, 14q deletion, 13q deletion, and some vertically transmitted infections. It is part of a group of defects called holoprosencephaly.

=== In syndromes ===
Cebocephaly is associated with Patau syndrome, Hartsfield syndrome, and Smith-Lemli-Opitz syndrome

== Diagnosis ==
Before birth, cebocephaly may sometimes be diagnosed using ultrasound. After birth, cebocephaly is diagnosed based on the characteristic symptoms. A CT scan may be used to confirm the diagnosis.

== Prognosis ==
Most infants born with cebocephaly die soon after birth.

== Epidemiology ==
Cebocephaly is very uncommon. Some estimates of its prevalence include 1 in 40,000 neonatal deliveries.

== History ==
The word "cebocephaly" is derived from Greek kebos (monkey), and kephale (head).

== See also ==
- Cephalic disorder
