= List of diseases (X) =

This is a list of diseases starting with the letter "X".

== X ==
- X, disease
- X chromosome, duplication Xq13 1 q21 1
- X chromosome, monosomy Xp22 pter
- X chromosome, monosomy Xq28
- X chromosome, trisomy Xp3
- X chromosome, trisomy Xpter Xq13
- X chromosome, trisomy Xq
- X chromosome, trisomy Xq25

== Xa–Xk ==
- Xanthic urolithiasis
- Xanthine oxydase deficiency
- Xanthinuria
- Xanthomatosis cerebrotendinous
- Xerocytosis, hereditary
- Xeroderma
- Xeroderma pigmentosum
  - Xeroderma pigmentosum, type 1
  - Xeroderma pigmentosum, type 2
  - Xeroderma pigmentosum, type 3
  - Xeroderma pigmentosum, type 5
  - Xeroderma pigmentosum, type 6
  - Xeroderma pigmentosum, type 7
  - Xeroderma pigmentosum, variant type
- XTE syndrome (Xeroderma, talipes, and enamel defect)
- Xerophthalmia
- Xerostomia
- Xk aprosencephaly

== Xl ==
- X-linked adrenal hypoplasia congenita
- X-linked adrenoleukodystrophy
- X-linked agammaglobulinemia
- X-linked alpha thalassemia mental retardation syndrome (ATR-X)
- X-linked dominance
- X-linked ichthyosis
- X-linked juvenile retinoschisis
- X-linked lymphoproliferative syndrome
- X-linked mental retardation
  - X-linked mental retardation and macroorchidism
  - X-linked mental retardation associated with marXq2
  - X-linked mental retardation Brooks type
  - X-linked mental retardation craniofacial abnormal microcephaly club
  - X-linked mental retardation De silva type
  - X-linked mental retardation Hamel type
  - X-linked mental retardation type Gustavson
  - X-linked mental retardation type Martinez
  - X-linked mental retardation type Raynaud
  - X-linked mental retardation type Schutz
  - X-linked mental retardation type Snyder
  - X-linked mental retardation type Wittner
- X-linked mental retardation-hypotonia
- X-linked severe combined immunodeficiency
- X-linked trait

== Xx–Xy ==
- XX male syndrome
- XY Female
- XY gonadal agenesis syndrome
- XYY syndrome
- XXXX syndrome
- XXXXX syndrome
