= Holoprosencephaly-ectrodactyly-cleft lip/palate syndrome =

- Other names: Hartsfield syndrome
- Specialty: Medical genetics
- Diagnostic method: genetic testing, physical examination
- Prevention: None
- Prognosis: Fatal in severe cases involving endocrine defects, but those with mild symptoms may reach to their 50s.
- Frequency: rare, about 35 cases have been described in the medical literature

Holoprosencephaly-ectrodactyly-cleft lip/palate syndrome, also simply known as Hartsfield syndrome, is a rare genetic disorder characterized by the presence of variable holoprosencephaly, ectrodactyly, cleft lip and palate, alongside generalized ectodermal abnormalities. Additional findings include endocrine anomalies and developmental delays.

== Signs and symptoms ==
Individuals with this condition exhibit the following symptoms:

- Agenesis or hypoplasia of the corpus callosum
- Encephalocele
- Holoprosencephaly
- Craniosynostosis
- Low-set ears
- Microphthalmia
- Hypertelorism
- Telecanthus
- Ptosis of the eyelid
- Down-slanting palpebral fissures
- Depression of the nasal bridge
- Cleft palate
- Cleft lip
- Respiratory problems
- Radial dysplasia
- Cleft hand deformity
- Syndactyly
- Fetal growth delay

== Complications ==
Most babies with this condition don't usually live to suffer the complications of the condition, since they usually are stillborn or die in early infancy (premature death).

== Genetics ==
This condition is caused by missense mutations in the FGFR1 gene, located in chromosome 8. These mutations can either be inherited in an autosomal dominant or an X-linked manner. This gene is essential for the creation of the fibroblast growth factor receptor 1 protein, which involve processes like cell division, regulating cell growth and maturation, blood vessel formation, healing of wounds and appropriate embryonic development. The mutations involved in this disorder either decrease or eliminate the proper functioning of the FGFR1 protein, this impairment takes the ability of the protein to bind to FGFs with it, this causes the receptor to be unable of transmitting signals properly.

== Types ==
There are some types (not clinically recognized) of this condition based on their mode of inheritance, some of them include autosomal recessive, autosomal dominant, and X-linked.

== Diagnosis ==
This condition can be diagnosed through the following:

- Whole exome sequencing
- Whole genome sequencing
- General physical examination
- Post-mortem examination/autopsy

== Prevalence ==
According to OrphaNet, 35 cases worldwide have been described in medical literature.

== History ==
This condition was first discovered in 1984 by Hartsfield et al. when they described a male baby with various congenital anomalies, of which three were holoprosencephaly, ectrodactyly, and cleft lip and palate. Other findings included depressed nasal bridge, hypertelorism, low-set ears, craniosynostosis, right radius deficiency, hypoplasia of the corpus callosum, agenesis of the septum pellucidum, frontal lobe fusion, and marked agenesis of the olfactory bulb and tract. Said baby had died when he was 7 days old.

== See also ==
- Holoprosencephaly
- Ectrodactyly
- Cleft lip and palate
- Stillbirth
- Miscarriage
- Ectrodactyly–ectodermal dysplasia–cleft syndrome
