= XK aprosencephaly =

Congenital disorder

- Other names: Garcia-Lurie syndrome, Aprosencephaly-atelencephaly syndrome
- Frequency: 1e-05%

XK aprosencephaly (also called Garcia-Lurie syndrome, aprosencephaly, and aprosencephaly-atelencephaly syndrome) is an extremely rare congenital disorder characterized by the absence of the embryonic forebrain. Because the prosencephalon gives way to the cerebral cortex, survival with aprosencephaly is not possible outside utero. The external symptoms are similar to holoprosencephaly, a related disorder, including a smaller than normal head (microcephaly), small eyeballs (microphthalmia), a small mouth (microstomia), anal atresia (no anus), and abnormalities of the external genitalia, radius, nostrils, and pharynx (throat).

== Presentation ==
There are many different symptoms that may indicate the presence of aprosencephaly. Patients typically have a smaller than normal skull, eyes, and mouth, termed microcephaly, microphthalmia, and microstomia. The eyes themselves may be closely separated (hypotelorism) or fused (cyclopia).

Infants affected by aprosencephaly often have a variety of abnormalities in the bones of the forearm, hand, and foot (called pre-axial limb defects), including small or absent thumbs, small or absent big toe, small hands, and various malformations of the radius (the main bone in the forearm).

Other associated symptoms include anal atresia, in which an infant is born without an anus, atrial septal defect (a hole between the top two chambers of the heart), ventricular septal defect (a hole between the bottom two chambers of the heart), and ambiguous genitalia.

During pregnancy, too much amniotic fluid may be present, a condition called polyhydramnios.

== Causes ==
No single cause is responsible for aprosencephaly. In 2005, it was found that autosomal recessive mutations of the SIX3 gene located on the short arm of chromosome 2 could result in aprosencephaly. Some cases were linked to trisomy 13, a disorder which also has a correlation with holoprosencephaly.

== Diagnosis ==
The diagnosis of aprosencephaly is made clinically with the use of skeletal imaging, brain imaging, and autopsy. Almost all fetuses with aprosencephaly naturally miscarry before the third trimester.

== History ==
A case of XK aprosencephaly was first reported in 1977, and was proposed as a genetic syndrome in 1988. As of 2015, less than 10 cases of aprosencephaly are reported in the medical literature.

== Terminology ==
Aprosencephaly is named so by combining the Greek prefix a- (without, lacking) and -prosencephalon (the embryonic forebrain). The syndromic form is known as XK aprosencephaly, with 'X' and 'K' referring to the surnames of the first two patients described with aprosencephaly.
