= Toxic leukoencephalopathy =

- Other names: Toxic spongiform leukoencephalopathy

Toxic leukoencephalopathy is a rare condition that is characterized by progressive damage (-pathy) to white matter (-leuko-) in the brain (-encephalo-), particularly myelin, due to causes such as exposure to substance use, environmental toxins, or chemotherapeutic drugs. The prevalence of this disease is infrequent and often goes unreported, especially in cases resulting from substance use. Magnetic resonance imaging (MRI) is a popular method to study and diagnose the disease. However, even with technological advances, the exact mechanism and underlying pathophysiology of toxic leukoencephalopathy remains unknown and is thought to vary between sources of toxicity. The clinical severity of toxic leukoencephalopathy also varies among patients, exposure time, concentration, and purity of the toxic agent. Some reversibility of the condition has been seen in many cases when the toxic agent is removed.

== Signs and symptoms ==
Symptoms vary widely between sources of toxicity, dosage, length of time patient was exposed to the toxic substance, patient history, and patient genetics. Especially in the case of leukoencephalopathy developing due to substance use or environmental toxins, symptoms typically do not develop until several days to months after exposure to the pharmacological agent. Clinical features range from inattention, forgetfulness, and changes in personality to dementia, coma, and even death. Obvious signs of the condition are difficulty with cognitive function and equilibrioception. Common initial symptoms include confusion, somnolence, generalized seizures, headaches, and vision impairment.

Young acute lymphoblastic leukemia patients with methotrexate-induced leukoencephalopathy appear asymptomatic. However, toxic leukoencephalopathy induced by substance use or environmental toxins have had more damaging side effects. Heroin-induced leukoencephalopathy has had three stages described. The first stage features soft (pseudobulbar) speech, cerebellar ataxia, motor restlessness, and apathy/bradyphrenia. The intermediate stage includes pyramidal tract and pseudobulbar signs, spastic paresis, myoclonic jerks, and choreoathetoid movements. The final or terminal stage is characterized by stretching spasms, akinetic mutism, hypotonic paresis, central pyrexia, and death. Similarly, leukoencephalopathy induced by orally administered methotrexate for arthritis patients presents similar symptoms including ataxia, dysarthria, and seizures; however, long-term cognitive effects remain unknown. Symptoms of leukoencephalopathy caused by overdose of metronidazole medication include dysarthria, gait disturbance, weakness of extremities, and mental confusion. Despite the pharmacological agent or source of toxicity, some patients completely recover from toxic leukoencephalopathy.

=== Related disorders ===
Posterior reversible encephalopathy syndrome (PRES) can also result from medication toxicity. Symptoms similar to those of leukoencephalopathy patients have been seen in PRES patients. However, the prognosis of toxic leukoencephalopathy is typically slightly worse than that of PRES because toxic leukoencephalopathy is more likely to lead to ataxia, dementia, or coma.

Hypoglycemic encephalopathy is often seen in diabetics as a result to accidental overdose with the long-acting sulfonylurea drug group. Brain regions affected by toxic leukoencephalopathy have been seen to be affected by this disease as well; however, hypoglycaemic encephalopathy has been known to involve both white and grey matter abnormalities.

== Causes ==
Various pharmacological agents have been known to cause toxic leukoencephalopathy. The most common causes are substance use and chemotherapy; however, the disease has also occurred on the rare occasion as a side effect of certain medications and environmental toxins.

=== Substance use ===
Leukoencephalopathy may result from the inhalation, intravenous injection, or ingestion of addictive substances. However, such occurrences are rare, sporadic, and often go undocumented. Leukoencephalopathy caused by inhalation of heroin, also known as "chasing the dragon" syndrome, is one of the most studied of these rare occurrences and has even been recognized for over twenty five years.

It is believed by some researchers that heroin-induced leukoencephalopathy may be caused by a contaminant, or “cutting agent,” in the heroin. However, no such agent has been identified; and indeed, toxic leukoencephalopathy has been observed as a result of intoxication with contaminant-free opiates. Cases include a 65-year-old woman who had mistakenly been taking three times the dose of methadone that had been prescribed for pain management, and a young girl intoxicated with pure morphine sulfate tablets.

Other drugs that have been associated with toxic leukoencephalopathy in much more rare occurrences include psychoactive drug 2C-E ("Europa"), oxycodone, cocaine, and methadone. The dose–response relationship for these substances remains unclear.

=== Chemotherapy ===
Various chemotherapy drugs have shown increased risk of cancer patients developing leukoencephalopathy. High doses of intravenous methotrexate, or intrathecal (injection into the spinal fluid) methotrexate are both necessary components of chemotherapy for acute lymphoblastic leukemia. However, these are known to cause asymptomatic leukoencephalopathy in children and young adults. Methotrexate-related leukoencephalopathy prevalence has been reported to decline with time and dosage. Other chemotherapeutic agents that have induced neurotoxicity include 5-fluorouracil and fludarabine.

=== Medication neurotoxicity ===
Besides its role in chemotherapy, methotrexate is also used as an orally administered treatment for rheumatoid arthritis. Leukoencephalopathy can develop from long-term treatment of methotrexate even at low doses. In contrast to intravenous methotrexate for cancer patients, leukoencephalopathy induced by orally taken methotrexate may be associated with cognitive dysfunction and even death.

Oxycodone is the main active ingredient in various oral pain relief medications. High doses of opiates such as oxycodone can lead to leukoencephalopathy. The activity of various opioid and nociceptive receptors appear to play a role in the disease; however, the exact mechanism remains unknown.

Metronidazole, an antibiotic used to treat anaerobic and protozoal infections, has been known at high doses to produce neurologic symptoms associated with toxic leukoencephalopathy.

=== Other ===
Toxic leukoencephalopathy may also result from carbon monoxide poisoning, ingestion of methanol, ingestion of ethylene, toluene toxicity, ethanol poisoning, ingestion of methylenedioxymethamphetamine (MDMA or "ecstasy"), or ingestion of paradichlorobenzene, which is a toxic agent in mothballs.

== Diagnosis ==
Due to advances in MRI, this neurological disorder has been characterized more successfully in more recent years. MRI can aid in the detection of injured brain tissue; however, the severity and extent of the damage demonstrated by imaging does not always reflect patient clinical status. Toxic leukoencephalopathy encompasses the degeneration of white matter tracts devoted to higher cerebral function; however, white matter can appear normal until the disease has progressed more intensely. Toxic leukoencephalopathy-related damage to central nervous system (CNS) white matter, typically of the periventricular nucleus, and other structures in the brain is often bilateral and symmetric. Heroin-induced leukoencephalopathy often involves damage to cerebellar white matter, posterior cerebral white matter, posterior limb of internal capsule, and cerebellar peduncles. The occipital lobe is typically most affected though the frontal, parietal, and temporal lobes have shown involvement as well. Other toxins have been shown to extend damage to other structures of the brain, including the hippocampus, dorsal medulla, and brainstem.

== Treatment ==
With such a wide array of causes and unclear understanding of the pathophysiology, there is no known cure or treatment for the disease. In some cases of leukoencephalopathy induced by medications, such as methotrexate and metronidazole, the disease will reduce gradually once the medication is no longer distributed to the patient. Depending on the source of toxicity or pharmacological substance and severity of the white matter damage, many patients can have complete clinical recovery.

Coenzyme Q and vitamin supplements, typically vitamin C and vitamin E, and other antioxidant therapies have been suggested to treat heroin-induced leukoencephalopathy patients. However, such treatments have rarely been trialed.

== See also ==
- Leukoencephalopathy
