= Moriz Probst =

Austrian psychiatrist and neuroanatomist

- Born: 1 October 1867; Deutschlandsberg
- Died: 21 March 1923 (aged 55); Vienna
- Occupations: psychiatrist and neuroanatomist

Moriz Probst (1 October 1867 in Deutschlandsberg - 21 March 1923 in Vienna) was an Austrian psychiatrist and neuroanatomist. He is best known for first description of so-called Probst bundles, the anomalous brain structures found in dysgenesis of corpus callosum.

He studied medicine in Graz, after graduation he worked as an assistant in Neuropsychiatric Clinic in Graz under Gabriel Anton. Later he was affiliated with Wiener Irrenanstalt. Since 1900 he practised as forensic psychiatrist in Vienna. He worked also in Landesirrenanstalt neuroanatomical laboratory.

== Selected works ==
- Physiologische, anatomische und pathologisch-anatomische Untersuchungen des Sehhügels. Archiv für Psychiatrie und Nervenkrankheiten 33: 721-817 (1900)
- Zur Anatomie und Physiologie experimentaler Zwischenhirnverletzungen. Deutsche Zeitschrift für Nervenheilkunde XVII (1900) doi:10.1007/BF01666342
- Zur Kenntniss der Pyramidenbahn. Normale und anormale Pyramidenbündel und Reizversuche der Kleinhirnrinde. Monatsschr. f. Psychiatrie u. Neurologie (1899)
- Über vom Vierhügel, von der Brücke und vom Kleinhirn absteigende Bahnen. Deutsche Zeitschr. f. Nervenheilkunde. Bd. XV.
- Über einen Fall vollständiger Rindenblindheit und vollständiger Amusie. Monatschrift f Psych u Neurol IX, 1 (1901)
- Über Anatomie und Physiologie des Kleinhirns. Arch für Psychiatrie 35, 3, 692-777 (1902) doi:10.1007/BF02275147
- Über den Bau des vollständig balkenlosen Gross-hirnes sowie über Mikrogyrie und Heterotopie der grauen Substanz doi:10.1007/BF02680175 (1901)
- Zur Anatomie und Physiologie des Kleinhirns (1902) doi:10.1007/BF02275147

== Bibliography ==
- Fischer I: Biographisches Lexikon der hervorragenden Ärzte der letzten fünfzig Jahre. T. 2. München-Berlin: Urban & Schwarzenberg, 1962, P. 1250.
