= Chasing the dragon =

Cantonese drug slang phrase

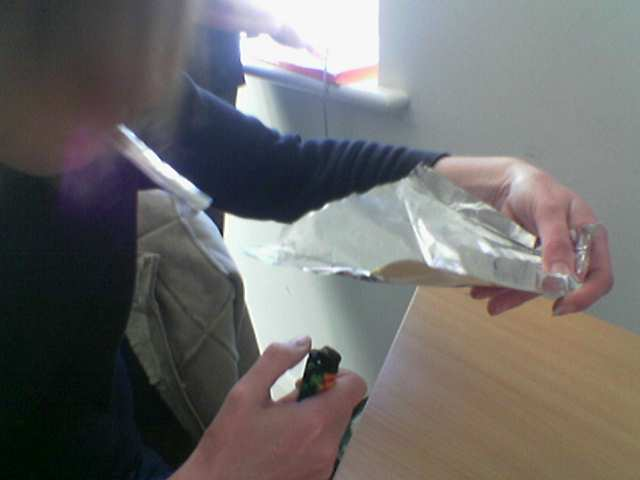
Demonstration of "chasing the dragon"

"Chasing the dragon" (CTD) (traditional Chinese: 追龍; simplified Chinese: 追龙; pinyin: zhuī lóng; Jyutping: zeoi1 lung4), or "foily" in Australian English, is the act of inhaling the vapor of a powdered psychoactive drug off a heated sheet of aluminium foil. The moving vapor is chased after with a tube (often rolled foil) through which the user inhales. The "chasing" occurs as the user gingerly keeps the liquid moving to keep it from overheating and burning up too quickly, on a heat-conducting material such as aluminium foil.

"Chasing the dragon" is also the elusive pursuit of a high equal to the user's first in the use of a drug, which after acclimation is no longer achievable. Used in this way, "chasing the dragon" can apply to any recreational drug administered by any means.

== History ==
The practice of smoking low-grade heroin via heating on tinfoil first originated in Hong Kong in the late 1950s, and thereafter spread to other parts of Southeast Asia during the 1960s, Western Europe during the late 1970s, and to the Indian subcontinent during the 1980s. A report published in 1958 by the Government of Hong Kong stated that since syringes were difficult to obtain in the colony, local addicts bought street deals of crude heroin (often mixed with powdered barbiturates) weighing approximately 0.126 grams for HK$2 each, which was then vaporized on tinfoil while the consumer inhaled the rising smoke through a cardboard tube. The use of common materials for consumption of the drugs allowed the addict to quickly dispose of the evidence if they detected the police nearby, and also allowed them to forgo carrying incriminating paraphernalia on their person (such as pipes or syringes).

== Risks ==
Inhaling heroin appears to rarely lead to toxic leukoencephalopathy. There are also documented cases of both severe acute asthma and exacerbation of underlying asthma caused by heroin inhalation, potentially resulting in death.

== See also ==
- Drug pipe
- One-hitter (smoking)
- Opium pipe
