= Homeobox protein TGIF1 =

Protein found in humans

TGIF1

Identifiers
- Aliases: TGIF1, HPE4, TGIF, TGFB induced factor homeobox 1
- External IDs: OMIM: 602630; MGI: 1194497; GeneCards: TGIF1
Available structures
PDB	Ortholog search: PDBe RCSB
PDB	List of PDB id codes 2LK2

Gene location (Human)
Chr.	Chromosome 18 (human)
Band	18p11.31	Start	3,411,608 bp
Band	18p11.31	End	3,459,978 bp

Gene location (Mouse)
Chr.	Chromosome 17 (mouse)
Band	17|17 E1.3	Start	71,151,200 bp
Band	17|17 E1.3	End	71,160,541 bp
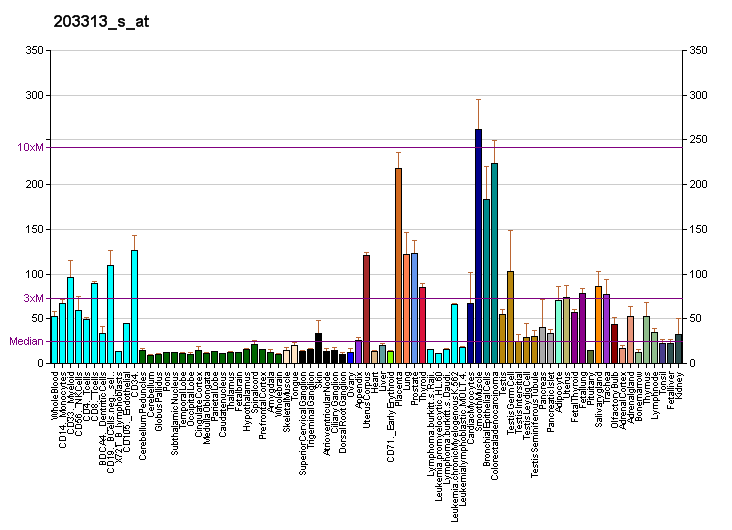
RNA expression pattern
Bgee	Human / Mouse (ortholog); Top expressed in: stromal cell of endometrium; gallbladder; ventricular zone; corpus epididymis; rectum; gastric mucosa; right uterine tube; left uterine tube; cartilage tissue; skin of abdomen / Top expressed in: tail of embryo; genital tubercle; saccule; embryo; ectoderm; otic vesicle; otic placode; epiblast; lip; primitive streak; More reference expression data
BioGPS	More reference expression data
Gene ontology
Molecular function	DNA binding; protein binding; DNA-binding transcription factor activity; RNA polymerase II cis-regulatory region sequence-specific DNA binding; DNA-binding transcription repressor activity, RNA polymerase II-specific; transcription corepressor activity; DNA-binding transcription factor activity, RNA polymerase II-specific; co-SMAD binding
Cellular component	nucleus; nucleoplasm
Biological process	regulation of transcription, DNA-templated; negative regulation of gene expression; multicellular organism development; cellular response to growth factor stimulus; negative regulation of transcription by RNA polymerase II; transcription, DNA-templated
Sources:Amigo / QuickGO
Orthologs
Databases	NCBI: entry; OMA: entry
Species	Human	Mouse
Entrez	7050	21815
Ensembl	ENSG00000177426	ENSMUSG00000047407
UniProt	Q15583	P70284
RefSeq (mRNA)	NM_001278682; NM_001278684; NM_001278686; NM_003244; NM_170695 NM_173207; NM_173208; NM_173209; NM_173210; NM_173211; NM_174886; NM_001374396; NM_001374397	NM_001164074; NM_001164075; NM_001164076; NM_001164077; NM_009372
RefSeq (protein)	NP_001265611; NP_001265613; NP_001265615; NP_003235; NP_733796 NP_775299; NP_775300; NP_775301; NP_775302; NP_775303; NP_777480; NP_001361325; NP_001361326	NP_001157546; NP_001157547; NP_001157548; NP_001157549; NP_033398
Location (UCSC)	Chr 18: 3.41 – 3.46 Mb	Chr 17: 71.15 – 71.16 Mb
PubMed search
- Wikidata
View/Edit Human	View/Edit Mouse

Homeobox protein TGIF1 is a protein that, in humans, is encoded by the TGIF1 gene. Alternative splicing has been observed at this locus and eight variants, encoding four distinct isoforms, are described.

== Function ==
The protein encoded by this gene is a member of the three-amino acid loop extension (TALE) superclass of atypical homeodomains. TALE homeobox proteins are highly conserved transcription regulators. This particular homeodomain binds to a previously characterized retinoid X receptor responsive element from the cellular retinol-binding protein II promoter. In addition to its role in inhibiting 9-cis-retinoic acid-dependent RXR alpha transcription activation of the retinoic acid responsive element, the protein is an active transcriptional co-repressor of SMAD2 and may participate in the transmission of nuclear signals during development and in the adult.

== Clinical significance ==
Mutations in this gene are associated with holoprosencephaly type 4, which is a structural anomaly of the brain. It has also been associated with risk of otitis media (inflammation of the middle ear)

== Interactions ==
Homeobox protein TGIF1 has been shown to interact with:

- C-jun,
- CTBP1,
- HDAC1, and
- Mothers against decapentaplegic homolog 2.
