= Longitudinal callosal fascicle =

Aberrant structure in the brain

Longitudinal callosal fascicles, or Probst bundles, are aberrant bundles of axons that run in a front-back (antero-posterior) direction rather than a left-right direction between the cerebral hemispheres. They are characteristic of patients with agenesis of the corpus callosum and are due to failure of the callosally-projecting neurons (mostly layer 2/3 pyramidal neurons) to extend axons across the midline and therefore form the corpus callosum. The inability of these axons to cross the midline results in anomalous axonal guidance and front-to-back projections within each hemisphere, rather than connecting between the hemispheres in the normal corpus callosum.

These longitudinal callosal fascicles were originally described by Moriz Probst in 1901 by gross anatomical observation. More recently, these anomalies are detected by magnetic resonance imaging or diffusion tensor imaging.
