= Colpocephaly =

Brain malformation in which the lateral ventricles are enlarged

- Embryonic brain
- Specialty: Neurology

Colpocephaly is a cephalic disorder involving the disproportionate enlargement of the occipital horns of the lateral ventricles and is usually diagnosed early after birth due to seizures. It is a nonspecific finding and is associated with multiple neurological syndromes, including agenesis of the corpus callosum, Chiari malformation, lissencephaly, and microcephaly. Although the exact cause of colpocephaly is not known yet, it is commonly believed to occur as a result of neuronal migration disorders during early brain development, intrauterine disturbances, perinatal injuries, and other central nervous system disorders. Individuals with colpocephaly have various degrees of motor disabilities, visual defects, spasticity, and moderate to severe intellectual disability. No specific treatment for colpocephaly exists, but patients may undergo certain treatments to improve their motor function or intellectual disability.

== Symptoms ==
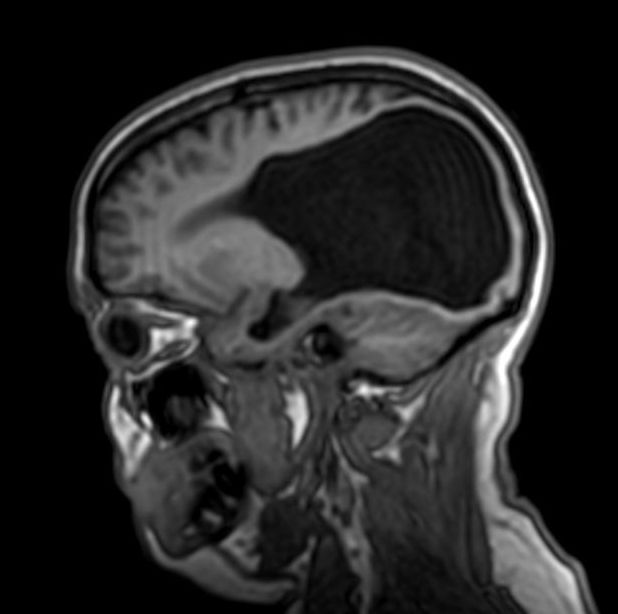

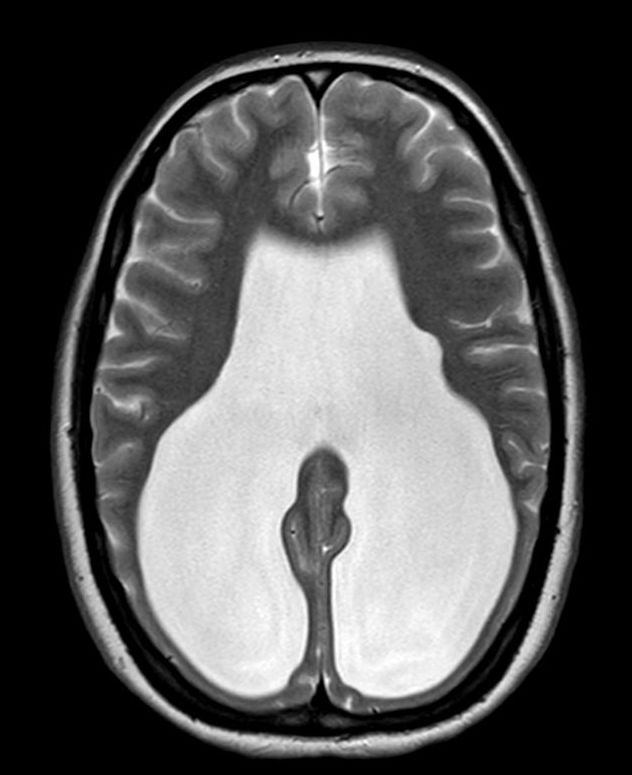

There are various symptoms of colpocephaly and patients can experience effects ranging from mild to severe. Some patients do not show most of the symptoms related to colpocephaly, such as psychomotor abnormalities and agenesis of the corpus callosum. In some cases, signs appear later on in life and a significant number of children only develop minor disabilities. The following list includes common symptoms of colpocephaly.

- partial or complete agenesis of the corpus callosum
- intellectual disability
- motor abnormalities
- visual defects such as, crossing of the eyes, missing visual fields, and optic nerve hypoplasia
- spasticity
- seizures
- cerebral palsy

Intracranial abnormalities include:

- Microcephaly
- Agenesis of the corpus callosum
- Meningomyelocele
- Lissencephaly
- Periventricular leukomalacia (PVL)
- Enlargement of the cisterna magna
- Cerebellar hypoplasia

== Causes ==
There is no known definitive single mechanism that causes colpocephaly. However, researchers believe there are many possible causes of colpocephaly. It is a common symptom of other neurological disorders in newborns, can be caused as a result of shunt treatment of hydrocephalus, developmental disorders in premature infants, due to intrauterine disturbances during pregnancy, genetic disorders, underdevelopment or lack of white matter in the cerebrum, and exposure of the mother and the developing fetus to medications, infections, radiation, or toxic substances. Also, it is usually more common in premature infants than in full-term infants, especially in babies born with hypoxia or lung immaturity.

Some of the central nervous system disorders which are associated with colpocephaly are as follows:

- polymicrogyria
- Periventricular leukomalacia (PVL)
- intraventricular hemorrhage
- Hydrocephalus
- schizencephaly
- microgyria
- microcephaly
- Pierre-Robin syndrome
- Neurofibromatosis

Often colpocephaly occurs as a result of hydrocephalus. Hydrocephalus is the accumulation of cerebrospinal fluid (CSF) in the ventricles or in the subarachnoid space over the brain. The increased pressure due to this condition dilates occipital horns causing colpocephaly.

The most generally accepted theory is that of neuronal migration disorders occurring during the second to fifth months of fetal life. Neuronal migration disorders are caused by abnormal migration, proliferation, and organization of neurons during early brain development. During the seventh week of gestation, neurons start proliferating in the germinal matrix which is located in the subependymal layer of the walls of the lateral ventricles. During the eighth week of gestation, the neurons then start migrating from the germinal zone to cortex along specialized radial glial fibers. Next, neurons organize themselves into layers and form synaptic contacts with other neurons present in the cortex. Under normal conditions, the neurons forming a germinal layer around ventricles migrate to the surface of the brain and form the cerebral cortex and basal ganglia. If this process is abnormal or disturbed it could result in the enlargement of the occipital horns of the lateral ventricles. Common prenatal disturbances that have been shown to disturb the neuronal migration process include the following:

- continuation of oral contraceptives
- exposure to alcohol
- intrauterine malnutrition
- intrauterine infections such as toxoplasmosis
- maternal drug ingestion during early pregnancy such as corticosteroids, salbutamol, and theophylline

Researchers also believe that these factors can cause destruction of neural elements that have previously been normally formed.

It is suggested that the underdevelopment or lack of white matter in the developing fetus could be a cause of colpocephaly. The partial or complete absence of white matter, also known as agenesis of the corpus callosum results in anatomic malformations that can lead to colpocephaly. This starts to occur around the middle of the second month to the fifth month of pregnancy. The lateral ventricles are formed as large cavities of the telencephalic vesicle. The size of the ventricles are decreased in normal development after the formation of the Foramen of Magendie, which decompresses the ventricular cavities. Myelination of the ventricular walls and association fibers of the corpus callosum and the calcarine fissure helps shape the occipital horns. In cases where this developmental process is interrupted, occipital horns are disproportionately enlarged.

Colpocephaly has been associated with chromosomal abnormalities such as trisomy 8 mosaic and trisomy 9 mosaic. A few reports of genetically transmitted colpocephaly are also found in literature. Some of these are of two siblings, monozygotic twins, and non-identical twins. The authors suggest a genetic origin with an autosomal or X-linked recessive inheritance rather than resulting from early prenatal disturbances.

== Diagnosis ==
=== Presentation ===
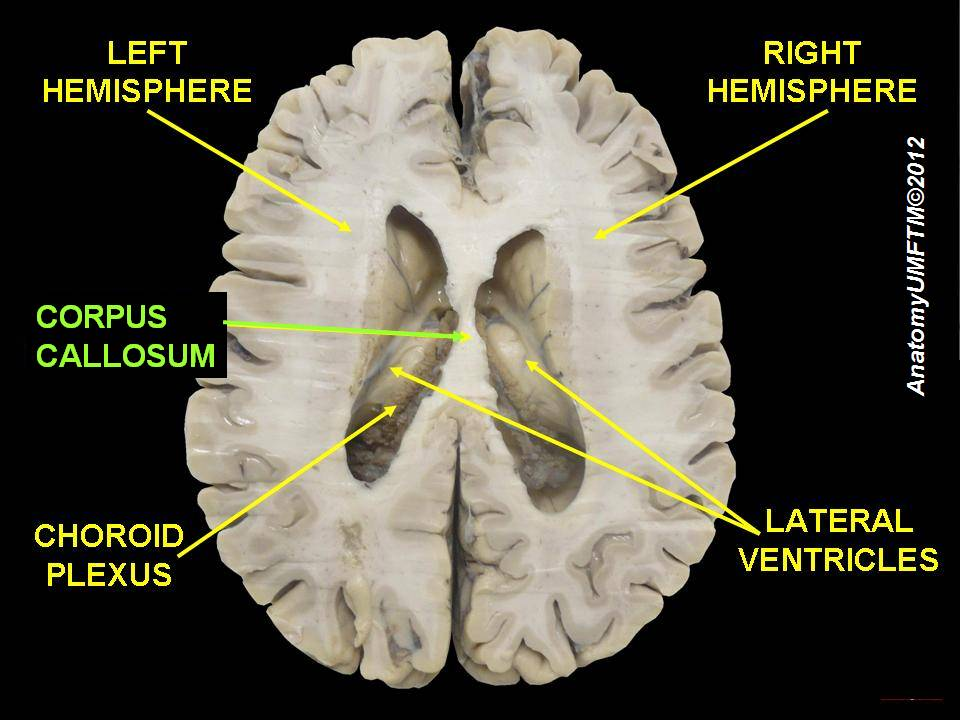
Corpus callosum

Colpocephaly is characterized by disproportionately large occipital horns of the lateral ventricles (also frontal and temporal ventricles in some cases). MRI and CT scans of patients demonstrate abnormally thick gray matter with thin poorly myelinated white matter. This happens as a result of partial or complete absence of the corpus callosum. Corpus callosum is the band of white matter connecting the two cerebral hemispheres. The corpus callosum plays an extremely important role in interhemispheric communication, thus lack of or absence of these neural fibers results in a number of disabilities.

The lemon sign on CT scans of patients refers to the shape of the fetal skull when the frontal bones lose their normal convex contour and appear flattened or inwardly scalloped. This gives the skull a shape similar to that of a lemon. The sign is seen on transverse sonograms of the fetal cranium obtained at the level of the ventricles. A special case is found in literature where lissencephaly, colpocephaly, and septal agenesis are all present together. The CT scans of the patient shows the ventricular system having a unique appearance of a crown of a king. This is referred to as the 'CROWN SIGN'.

=== Prenatal ===
Diagnosing colpocephaly prenatally is difficult because in many cases signs start to appear after birth. Prenatal diagnosis is made by detecting enlargement of either or both occipital horns of the lateral ventricles. Usually prenatal ultrasounds don't show cephalic abnormalities and in cases that they do show abnormality is of low accuracy, making it difficult to diagnose colpocephaly. Often, abnormalities in prenatal ultrasounds can be misdiagnosed as hydrocephalus.

=== Postnatal ===
After birth, MR imaging can be done to look for cephalic abnormalities. This is the most commonly used method for diagnosing colpocephaly. Physicians look for abnormally large occipital horns of the lateral ventricles and diminished thickness of white matter. Spinal tapping is not a preferred method for diagnosis because newborn babies with colpocephaly or hydrocephaly have open fontanelles which makes it difficult to collect CSF. Also, colpocephaly is not associated with increased pressure.

== Treatment ==
Colpocephaly is usually non-fatal. There has been relatively little research conducted to improve treatments for colpocephaly, and there is no known definitive treatment of colpocephaly yet. Specific treatment depends on associated symptoms and the degree of dysfunction. Anticonvulsant medications can be given to prevent seizure complications, and physical therapy is used to prevent contractures (shrinkage or shortening of muscles) in patients that have limited mobility. Patients can also undergo surgeries for stiff joints to improve motor function. The prognosis for individuals with colpocephaly depends on the severity of the associated conditions and the degree of abnormal brain development.

A rare case of colpocephaly is described in literature which is associated with macrocephaly instead of microcephaly. Increased intracranial pressure was also found in the condition. Similar symptoms (absence of corpus callosum and increased head circumference) were noted as in the case of colpocephaly that is associated with microcephaly. A bi-ventricular peritoneal shunt was performed, which greatly improved the symptoms of the condition. Ventriculo-peritoneal shunts are used to drain the fluid into the peritoneal cavity.

== History ==
These brain abnormalities were first described by Benda in 1940 as 'vesiculocephaly'. In 1946, Yakovlev and Wadsworth coined the term colpocephaly from the Greek word kolpos (hollow) and kephalos (head). It was suggested that the enlargement of ventricles occurred as a result of white matter development arrest during early fetal life. They stated that "in the apparent dilatation of the occipital horns...it represented a failure of development of the cerebral wall with persistence of the embryonal vesicular character of the brain." Yakovlev meant for this term to apply to the result of disturbances during the development of the brain. He suggested the term 'hydrocephalus ex vauco' to be used for enlargement of the occipital horns of the lateral ventricles as a result of damage to the brain after it is normally formed. However, today the term colpocephaly is used to describe both the situations.

== Future Research ==
Stem cell therapy is considered a very promising treatment for patients with colpocephaly. Oligodendroglial cells can be used which will increase the production of myelin and alleviate symptoms of colpocephaly. Damage to the developing oligodendrocytes near the cerebral ventricles causes cerebral palsy as well as other demyelinating diseases such as multiple sclerosis and leukodystrophies. Demyelination reduces the speed of conduction in affected nerves resulting in disabilities in cognition, sensation, and motor. Therefore, by using oligodendrocyte stem cells the effects of cerebral palsy can be treated and other symptoms of colpocephaly can be alleviated.
