= ZIC5 =

Identifiers
- Aliases: ZIC5, Zic family member 5
- External IDs: OMIM: 617896; MGI: 1929518; GeneCards: ZIC5

Gene location (Human)
Chr.	Chromosome 13 (human)
Band	13q32.3	Start	99,962,964 bp
Band	13q32.3	End	99,971,767 bp

Gene location (Mouse)
Chr.	Chromosome 14 (mouse)
Band	14|14 E5	Start	122,694,207 bp
Band	14|14 E5	End	122,703,089 bp
RNA expression pattern
Bgee	Human / Mouse (ortholog); Top expressed in: right hemisphere of cerebellum; ventricular zone; ganglionic eminence; testicle; sural nerve; cerebellar vermis; right frontal lobe; gonad; Brodmann area 9; cingulate gyrus / Top expressed in: pineal gland; habenula; stria vascularis; epiblast; otolith organ; utricle; lobe of cerebellum; cerebellar vermis; tail of embryo; lateral septal nucleus; More reference expression data
BioGPS	n/a
Gene ontology
Molecular function	DNA binding; metal ion binding; nucleic acid binding; DNA-binding transcription factor activity, RNA polymerase II-specific; RNA polymerase II transcription regulatory region sequence-specific DNA binding
Cellular component	nucleus
Biological process	multicellular organism development; cell differentiation; nervous system development; regulation of transcription by RNA polymerase II; central nervous system development
Sources:Amigo / QuickGO
Orthologs
Databases	NCBI: entry; OMA: entry
Species	Human	Mouse
Entrez	85416	65100
Ensembl	ENSG00000139800	ENSMUSG00000041703
UniProt	Q96T25	Q7TQ40
RefSeq (mRNA)	NM_033132	NM_022987
RefSeq (protein)	NP_149123	NP_075363
Location (UCSC)	Chr 13: 99.96 – 99.97 Mb	Chr 14: 122.69 – 122.7 Mb
PubMed search
- Wikidata
View/Edit Human	View/Edit Mouse

ZIC5 is a member of the Zinc finger of the cerebellum (ZIC) protein family. ZIC5 is located on chromosome 13 in a divergently transcribed gene pair with the closely related gene ZIC2. It has been suggested that this tandem arrangement allows ZIC2 and ZIC5 to share regulatory elements and causes the two genes to have very similar expression patterns.

ZIC5 is classified as a ZIC protein due to conservation of the five C2H2 zinc fingers, which enables the protein to interact with DNA and regulate transcription. Similar to other ZIC family members, ZIC5 is also able to interact with TCF proteins in order to inhibit canonical Wnt signalling. Mutation or loss of ZIC5 has not been associated with any congenital defects in humans. however, loss of Zic5 in mice causes a range of phenotypes, including neural crest defects, neural tube defects, hydrocephaly and skeletal defects, indicating multiple functions during early development. Experiments in Xenopus also support the idea that Zic5 can regulate formation of neural crest, suggesting this function is conserved across species.

ZIC5 has recently been found to be regulated by the post-translational modification SUMOylation in order to alter the DNA and protein binding properties of ZIC5 to promote neural crest specification. Several other genes involved in the specification of neural crest, including Pax6, Sox9 and Sox10, also been found to be regulated by the same postransl-tational modification, suggesting that SUMOylation may have a widespread role in formation of the neural crest.
