= Proboscis (anomaly) =

Facial deformity

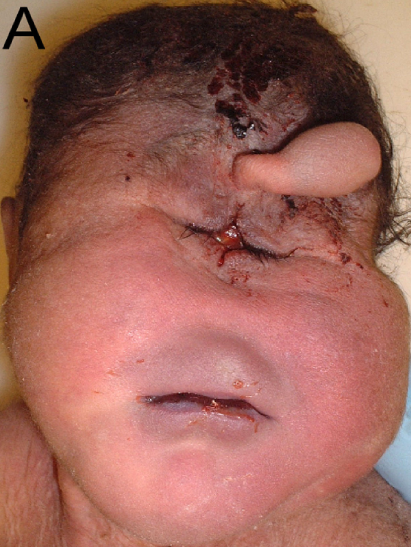
Proboscis in Patau syndrome. Cyclopia (a single median eye) is associated with arrhinia (absence of the nose) and proboscis formation above the eye.

In teratology, a proboscis is a blind-ended, tube-like structure, commonly located in the middle of the face. It is often seen in severe forms of holoprosencephaly that include cyclopia and is usually the result of abnormal development of the nose.

== Types ==
Proboscis formation is placed into four general types: holoprosencephalic proboscis, lateral nasal proboscis, supernumerary probosci, and disruptive proboscis.

=== Holoprosencephalic proboscis ===
A holoprosencephalic proboscis is found in holoprosencephaly (a condition in which the forebrain of the embryo fails to develop into two hemispheres as it should). In cyclopia or ethmocephaly, a proboscis is an abnormally formed nose. In cyclopia, a single eye in the middle of the face is associated with arrhinia (absence of the nose) and usually with proboscis formation above the eye. In ethmocephaly, two separate hypoteloric eyes (eyes placed very close together) are associated with arrhinia and proboscis formation above the eye. In cebocephaly, no proboscis formation occurs, but a single-nostril nose is present.

=== Lateral proboscis ===
A lateral proboscis, also known as proboscis lateralis or lateral nasal proboscis, is a tube-shaped structure and represents incomplete formation of one side of the nose. The olfactory bulb is usually non-functional on the side involved in the malformation. The tear duct, nasal bone, nasal cavity, vomer (the small thin bone separating the left and right nasal passages), maxillary sinus, ethmoidal sinuses, and another nasal structure known as the cribriform plate cells are often missing on this side as well. Ocular hypertelorism (eyes set far apart) may be present. The proboscis lateralis is a rare nasal anomaly.

=== Supernumerary proboscis ===
A supernumerary proboscis, or accessory proboscis, is found when both nostrils are formed and there is a proboscis in addition to it. Accessory proboscis arise from a supernumerary olfactory placode.

=== Disruptive proboscis ===
A disruptive proboscis occurs if a hamartoneoplastic lesion (benign growths such as are found in disorders like neurofibromatosis and tubular sclerosis) arises in the prosencephalon (forebrain) of the embryo in its early stages of development.
