= Ethmocephaly =

Congenital disorder of the brain, head, and facial structures

Ethmocephaly is a type of cephalic disorder caused by holoprosencephaly. Ethmocephaly is the rarest phenotypic variant of a group of defects called the holoprosencephaly (HPE) malformation sequence; other variants include cebocephaly, cyclopia, and median cleft palate. It consists of a proboscis separating narrow-set eyes with an absent nose and microphthalmia (abnormal smallness of one or both eyes). Cebocephaly, another facial anomaly, is characterized by a small, flattened nose with a single nostril situated below incomplete or underdeveloped closely set eyes.

The least severe in the spectrum of facial anomalies is the median cleft lip, also called premaxillary agenesis.

Although the causes of most cases of holoprosencephaly remain unknown, some may be due to dominant or chromosome causes. Such chromosomal anomalies as trisomy 13 and trisomy 18 have been found in association with holoprosencephaly, or other neural tube defects. Genetic counseling and genetic testing, such as amniocentesis, is usually offered during a pregnancy if holoprosencephaly is detected. The recurrence risk depends on the underlying cause. If no cause is identified and the fetal chromosomes are normal, the chance to have another pregnancy affected with holoprosencephaly is about 6%.

There is no treatment for holoprosencephaly and the prognosis for individuals with the disorder is poor. Most of those who survive show no significant developmental gains. For children who survive, treatment is symptomatic. It is possible that improved management of diabetic pregnancies may help prevent holoprosencephaly, however there is no means of primary prevention.

== See also ==
- Holoprosencephaly
- Cephalic disorder
- Cyclopia
