= SIX3 =

Protein-coding gene in the species Homo sapiens

Identifiers
- Aliases: SIX3, HPE2, SIX homeobox 3
- External IDs: OMIM: 603714; MGI: 102764; GeneCards: SIX3

Gene location (Human)
Chr.	Chromosome 2 (human)
Band	2p21	Start	44,941,702 bp
Band	2p21	End	44,946,071 bp

Gene location (Mouse)
Chr.	Chromosome 17 (mouse)
Band	17 E4|17 55.42 cM	Start	85,921,036 bp
Band	17 E4|17 55.42 cM	End	85,936,730 bp
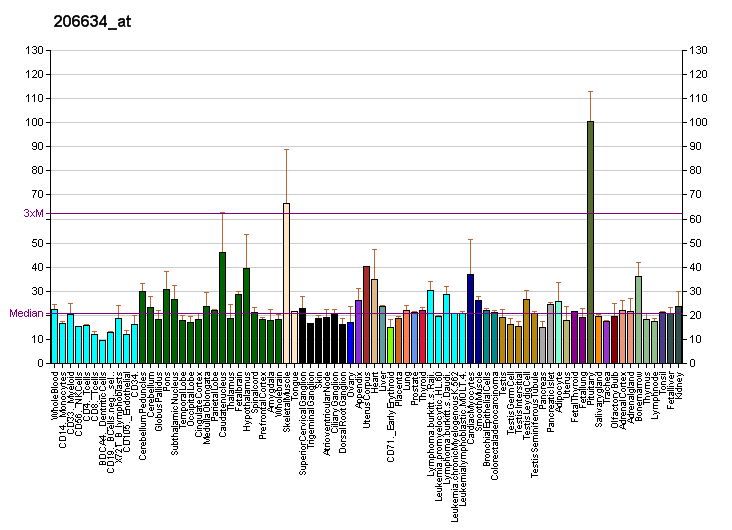
RNA expression pattern
Bgee	Human / Mouse (ortholog); Top expressed in: retinal pigment epithelium; nasal epithelium; nucleus accumbens; mucosa of paranasal sinus; optic nerve; caudate nucleus; putamen; olfactory zone of nasal mucosa; anterior pituitary; buccal mucosa cell / Top expressed in: optic vesicle; epithelium of lens; pretectal area; subthalamus; neural layer of retina; zona incerta; suprachiasmatic nucleus; optic recess; thalamic reticular nucleus; optic stalk; More reference expression data
BioGPS	More reference expression data
Gene ontology
Molecular function	RNA polymerase II cis-regulatory region sequence-specific DNA binding; DNA binding; sequence-specific DNA binding; DNA-binding transcription factor activity; transcription coactivator activity; histone deacetylase binding; DNA-binding transcription activator activity, RNA polymerase II-specific; protein binding; transcription factor activity, RNA polymerase II distal enhancer sequence-specific binding; transcription corepressor binding; signaling receptor binding; DNA-binding transcription factor activity, RNA polymerase II-specific; transcription cis-regulatory region binding
Cellular component	nucleus; transcription regulator complex
Biological process	eye development; forebrain anterior/posterior pattern specification; pituitary gland development; regulation of transcription, DNA-templated; negative regulation of neuron differentiation; proximal/distal axis specification; lens fiber cell apoptotic process; protein import into nucleus; neuroblast differentiation; forebrain dorsal/ventral pattern formation; optic vesicle morphogenesis; negative regulation of Wnt signaling pathway; apoptotic process involved in development; transcription by RNA polymerase II; regulation of neural precursor cell proliferation; transcription, DNA-templated; regulation of neural retina development; multicellular organism development; telencephalon regionalization; diencephalon development; telencephalon development; brain development; lens development in camera-type eye; lens fiber cell differentiation; regulation of cell population proliferation; regulation of neuroblast proliferation; lens induction in camera-type eye; epithelial cell maturation; neuroblast migration; circadian behavior; camera-type eye development; negative regulation of transcription, DNA-templated; cell proliferation in forebrain; positive regulation of transcription by RNA polymerase II; visual perception; regulation of cell cycle phase transition; anatomical structure development
Sources:Amigo / QuickGO
Orthologs
Databases	NCBI: entry; OMA: entry
Species	Human	Mouse
Entrez	6496	20473
Ensembl	ENSG00000138083	ENSMUSG00000038805
UniProt	O95343	Q62233
RefSeq (mRNA)	NM_005413	NM_011381
RefSeq (protein)	NP_005404	NP_035511
Location (UCSC)	Chr 2: 44.94 – 44.95 Mb	Chr 17: 85.92 – 85.94 Mb
PubMed search
- Wikidata
View/Edit Human	View/Edit Mouse

Homeobox protein SIX3 is a protein that in humans is encoded by the SIX3 gene.

== Function ==
The SIX homeobox 3 (SIX3) gene is crucial in embryonic development by providing necessary instructions for the formation of the forebrain and eye development. SIX3 is a transcription factor that binds to specific DNA sequences, controlling whether the gene is active or inactive. Activity of the SIX3 gene represses Wnt1 gene activity which ensures development of the forebrain and establishes the proper anterior posterior identity in the mammalian brain. By blocking Wnt1 activity, SIX3 is able to prevent abnormal expansion of the posterior portion of the brain into the anterior brain area.

During retinal development, SIX3 has been proven to hold a key responsibility in the activation of Pax6, the master regulator of eye development. Furthermore, SIX3 assumes its activity in the PLE (presumptive lens ectoderm), the region in which the lens is expected to develop. If its presence is removed from this region, the lens fails to thicken and construct itself to its proper morphological state. Also, SIX3 plays a strategic role in the activation of SOX2.

SIX3 has also been proven to play a role in repression of selected members of the Wnt family. In retinal development, SIX3 is responsible for the repression of Wnt8b. Also, in forebrain development, SIX3 is responsible for the repression of Wnt1 and activation of SHH, Sonic Hedgehog gene.

== Clinical significance ==
Mutations in SIX3 are the cause of a severe brain malformation, called holoprosencephaly type 2 (HPE2). In HPE2, the brain fails to separate into two hemispheres during early embryonic development, leading to eye and brain malformations, which result in serious facial abnormalities.

A mutant zebrafish knockout model has been developed, in which the anterior part of the head was missing due to the atypical increase of Wnt1 activity. When injected with SIX3, these zebrafish embryos were able to successfully develop a normal forebrain. When SIX3 was turned off in mice, it resulted in a lack of retina formation due to excessive expression of Wnt8b in the region where the forebrain normally develops. Both of these studies demonstrate the importance of SIX3 activity in brain and eye development.

== Interactions ==
SIX3 has been shown to interact with TLE1 and Neuron-derived orphan receptor 1.
