= WNT8B =

Protein-coding gene in humans

Identifiers
- Aliases: WNT8B, Wnt family member 8B
- External IDs: OMIM: 601396; MGI: 109485; GeneCards: WNT8B

Gene location (Human)
Chr.	Chromosome 10 (human)
Band	10q24.31	Start	100,463,009 bp
Band	10q24.31	End	100,483,744 bp

Gene location (Mouse)
Chr.	Chromosome 19 (mouse)
Band	19 C3|19 37.98 cM	Start	44,481,911 bp
Band	19 C3|19 37.98 cM	End	44,502,712 bp
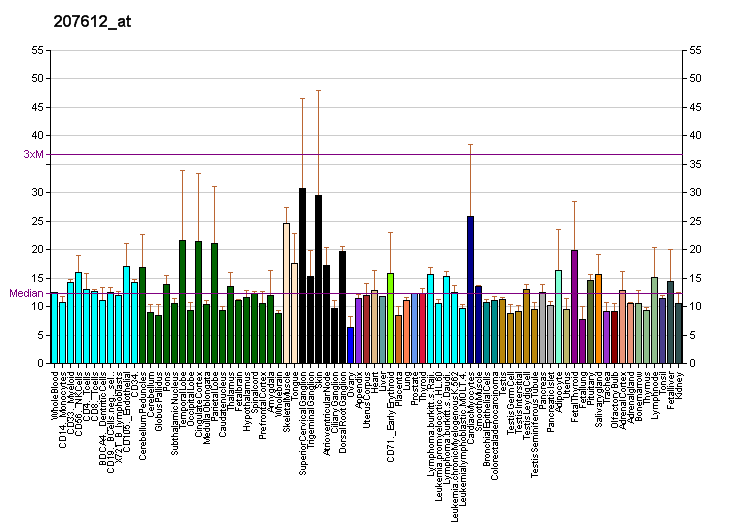
RNA expression pattern
Bgee	Human / Mouse (ortholog); Top expressed in: body of pancreas; renal cortex; human kidney; right testis; left testis; olfactory zone of nasal mucosa; granulocyte; liver; urinary bladder; prostate / Top expressed in: corneal epithelium; lumbar subsegment of spinal cord; set of lens fibers; vein; ascending aorta; embryo; corneal endothelium; aortic valve; corneal stroma; embryo; More reference expression data
BioGPS	More reference expression data
Gene ontology
Molecular function	signaling receptor binding; frizzled binding; receptor ligand activity
Cellular component	extracellular region; extracellular space
Biological process	multicellular organism development; cellular response to retinoic acid; cell fate commitment; determination of dorsal identity; response to estradiol; gastrulation; response to retinoic acid; neuron differentiation; signal transduction; nervous system development; beta-catenin destruction complex disassembly; Wnt signaling pathway; regulation of signaling receptor activity; canonical Wnt signaling pathway
Sources:Amigo / QuickGO
Orthologs
Databases	NCBI: entry; OMA: entry
Species	Human	Mouse
Entrez	7479	22423
Ensembl	ENSG00000075290	ENSMUSG00000036961
UniProt	Q93098	Q9WUD6
RefSeq (mRNA)	NM_003393	NM_011720
RefSeq (protein)	NP_003384	n/a
Location (UCSC)	Chr 10: 100.46 – 100.48 Mb	Chr 19: 44.48 – 44.5 Mb
PubMed search
- Wikidata
View/Edit Human	View/Edit Mouse

Protein Wnt-8b is a protein that in humans is encoded by the WNT8B gene.

The WNT gene family consists of structurally related genes that encode secreted signaling proteins. These proteins have been implicated in oncogenesis and in several developmental processes, including regulation of cell fate and patterning during embryogenesis.

This gene is a member of the WNT gene family. It encodes a protein showing 95%, 86%, and 71% amino acid identity to the mouse, zebrafish and Xenopus Wnt8B proteins, respectively. The expression patterns of the human and mouse genes appear identical and are restricted to the developing brain. The chromosomal location of this gene to 10q24 suggests it as a candidate gene for partial epilepsy.
