= ZIC2 =

Protein-coding gene in the species Homo sapiens

Identifiers
- Aliases: ZIC2, HPE5, Zic family member 2
- External IDs: OMIM: 603073; MGI: 106679; GeneCards: ZIC2

Gene location (Human)
Chr.	Chromosome 13 (human)
Band	13q32.3	Start	99,981,784 bp
Band	13q32.3	End	99,986,765 bp

Gene location (Mouse)
Chr.	Chromosome 14 (mouse)
Band	14 E5|14 65.97 cM	Start	122,712,847 bp
Band	14 E5|14 65.97 cM	End	122,717,264 bp
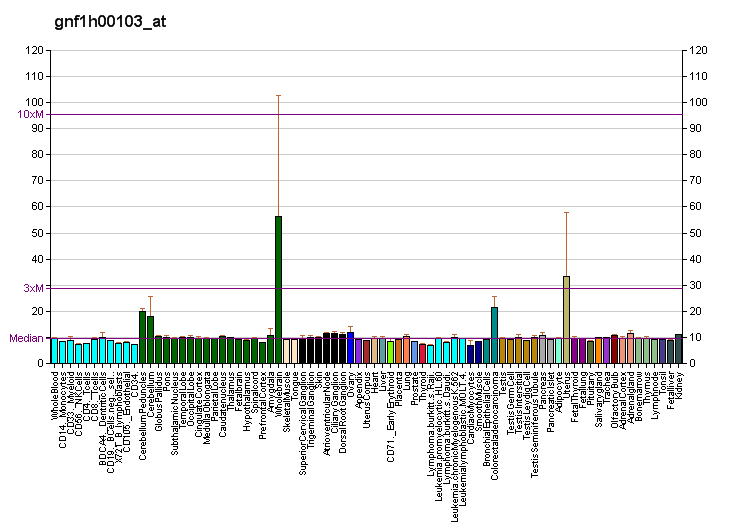
RNA expression pattern
Bgee	Human / Mouse (ortholog); Top expressed in: cerebellar cortex; cerebellar hemisphere; right hemisphere of cerebellum; pons; cerebellar vermis; ventricular zone; trigeminal ganglion; endothelial cell; lateral nuclear group of thalamus; ganglionic eminence / Top expressed in: cerebellar cortex; neural groove; neural fold; stria vascularis; epiblast; lumbar subsegment of spinal cord; ventricular zone; tail of embryo; urethra; male urethra; More reference expression data
BioGPS	More reference expression data
Gene ontology
Molecular function	DNA-binding transcription factor activity; DNA binding; chromatin DNA binding; metal ion binding; nucleic acid binding; DNA-binding transcription factor activity, RNA polymerase II-specific; RNA polymerase II transcription regulatory region sequence-specific DNA binding; DNA-binding transcription activator activity, RNA polymerase II-specific
Cellular component	cytoplasm; nucleus; nuclear body
Biological process	positive regulation of transcription, DNA-templated; multicellular organism development; cell differentiation; brain development; positive regulation of DNA-binding transcription factor activity; negative regulation of transcription, DNA-templated; regulation of transcription, DNA-templated; transcription, DNA-templated; visual perception; nervous system development; regulation of transcription by RNA polymerase II; positive regulation of transcription by RNA polymerase II; central nervous system development
Sources:Amigo / QuickGO
Orthologs
Databases	NCBI: entry; OMA: entry
Species	Human	Mouse
Entrez	7546	22772
Ensembl	ENSG00000043355	ENSMUSG00000061524
UniProt	O95409	Q62520
RefSeq (mRNA)	NM_007129	NM_009574
RefSeq (protein)	NP_009060	NP_033600
Location (UCSC)	Chr 13: 99.98 – 99.99 Mb	Chr 14: 122.71 – 122.72 Mb
PubMed search
- Wikidata
View/Edit Human	View/Edit Mouse

Zinc finger protein ZIC2 is a protein that in humans is encoded by the ZIC2 gene. ZIC2 is a member of the Zinc finger of the cerebellum (ZIC) protein family.

== Function ==
ZIC2 is classified as a ZIC protein due to conservation of the five C2H2 zinc fingers, which enables the protein to interact with DNA and proteins.

== Clinical significance ==
Correct function of these proteins is critical for early development, and as such mutations of the genes encoding these proteins is known to result in various congenital defects. For example, mutation of ZIC2 is known to result in holoprosencephaly due to defect in the function of the organizer region (node), which leads to a defective anterior notochord (ANC). The ANC provides a maintenance signal to the Prechordal plate (PCP), thus a defective ANC results in degradation of the PCP, which is normally responsible for sending a shh signal to the developing forebrain resulting in the formation of the two hemispheres. Holoprosencephaly is the most common structural anomaly of the human forebrain.

Recently ZIC2 has also been shown to be critical for establishment of the left-right axis, thus loss of ZIC2 function can result in defects in heart formation. Another member of the ZIC family, ZIC3, has previously been linked to establishment of the left-right axis.

A polyhistidine tract polymorphism in this gene may be associated with increased risk of neural tube defects (spina bifida). This gene is closely linked to a gene encoding ZIC5, a related family member on chromosome 13.

== Interactions ==
ZIC2 has recently been found to interact with TCF7L2, enabling it to act as a Wnt/β-catenin signalling inhibitor. Such a role is of critical importance, as not only is correct Wnt signalling critical for early development, Wnt signalling has also been found to be upregulated to several cancers. ZIC2 has also been shown to interact with GLI3.
