= Pancreaticobiliary maljunction =

- Other names: PBM
- Specialty: Gastroenterology

Pancreaticobiliary maljunction (PBM) is a congenital malformation where the pancreatic and bile ducts meet outside of the duodenum. There are two varieties of PBM: one with biliary dilatation and the other without. When an abnormally long common channel is visible on direct cholangiography, such as endoscopic retrograde cholangiopancreatography or magnetic resonance cholangiopancreatography, PBM is diagnosed.

== Signs and symptoms ==
The sphincter of Oddi does not control the pancreaticobiliary junction in patients with pancreaticobiliary maljunction (PBM). Because the pressure in the pancreatic duct is typically higher than in the bile duct, pancreatic juice often refluxes into the biliary tract. Patients with PBM experience continuous regurgitation, but this does not always result in symptoms.

Increased pressure in the pancreatic and bile ducts as a result of a primary stricture of the distal bile duct or blockage of the common channel can cause symptoms like jaundice, vomiting, and abdominal pain. This is frequently transient and may be brought on by impaction from a protein plug.

=== Complications ===
In patients with PBM, regardless of the presence of biliary dilatation, acute pancreatitis is more common in children (30% of patients) than in adults (9%). Although pancreatitis is often mild with subtle imaging findings, it can also be recurrent. One possible cause of acute pancreatitis linked to PBM is protein plugs. Chronic pancreatitis affects about 3% of PBM patients.

== Causes ==
There is disagreement over PBM's pathophysiology. Nonetheless, a number of studies have indicated that it may be related to abnormal ventral pancreatic development. It is thought that the ventral pancreatic duct is connected to the origin of the common channel because small pancreatic branch ducts have been observed emerging from the common channel in certain PBM patients. Rarely, PBM is linked to additional congenital pancreatic abnormalities like pancreas divisum or annular pancreas.

== Diagnosis ==
The JSPBM committee on PBM diagnostic criteria states that anatomical examination findings or imaging characteristics are used to diagnose PBM. The diagnosis is confirmed by the existence of an abnormally long common channel, an abnormal union between the pancreatic and bile ducts, or a pancreatic-biliary junction outside the duodenal wall.

== Treatment ==
Regardless of whether symptoms are present, risk-reducing surgery is advised for patients with PBM because it is a risk factor for biliary cancer.
