= PRRX1 =

Protein-coding gene in humans

Identifiers
- Aliases: PRRX1, AGOTC, PHOX1, PMX1, PRX-1, PRX1, paired related homeobox 1
- External IDs: OMIM: 167420; MGI: 97712; GeneCards: PRRX1

Gene location (Human)
Chr.	Chromosome 1 (human)
Band	1q24.2	Start	170,662,728 bp
Band	1q24.2	End	170,739,421 bp

Gene location (Mouse)
Chr.	Chromosome 1 (mouse)
Band	1 H2.1|1 70.53 cM	Start	163,072,688 bp
Band	1 H2.1|1 70.53 cM	End	163,141,279 bp
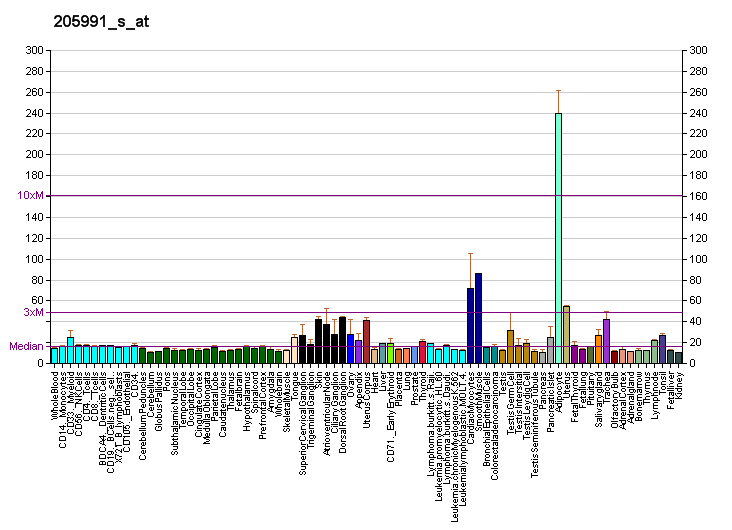
RNA expression pattern
Bgee	Human / Mouse (ortholog); Top expressed in: Achilles tendon; urethra; tendon of biceps brachii; saphenous vein; parietal pleura; synovial joint; vena cava; pericardium; skin of hip; seminal vesicula / Top expressed in: calvaria; maxillary prominence; dermis; genital tubercle; foot; ankle; mandibular prominence; stroma of bone marrow; body of femur; skin of external ear; More reference expression data
BioGPS	More reference expression data
Gene ontology
Molecular function	sequence-specific DNA binding; transcription coactivator activity; DNA binding; HMG box domain binding; RNA polymerase II cis-regulatory region sequence-specific DNA binding; DNA-binding transcription repressor activity, RNA polymerase II-specific; DNA-binding transcription factor activity, RNA polymerase II-specific
Cellular component	nucleus; nucleoplasm; cytosol
Biological process	embryonic skeletal system morphogenesis; roof of mouth development; regulation of transcription, DNA-templated; neuron fate determination; positive regulation of smoothened signaling pathway; regulation of neuron projection regeneration; negative regulation of transcription by RNA polymerase II; neuronal stem cell population maintenance; multicellular organism development; cartilage development; positive regulation of mesenchymal cell proliferation; embryonic limb morphogenesis; inner ear morphogenesis; artery morphogenesis; middle ear morphogenesis; embryonic cranial skeleton morphogenesis; positive regulation of transcription by RNA polymerase II; transcription by RNA polymerase II
Sources:Amigo / QuickGO
Orthologs
Databases	NCBI: entry; OMA: entry
Species	Human	Mouse
Entrez	5396	18933
Ensembl	ENSG00000116132	ENSMUSG00000026586
UniProt	P54821	P63013
RefSeq (mRNA)	NM_006902; NM_022716	NM_001025570; NM_011127; NM_175686
RefSeq (protein)	NP_008833; NP_073207	NP_001020741; NP_035257; NP_783617
Location (UCSC)	Chr 1: 170.66 – 170.74 Mb	Chr 1: 163.07 – 163.14 Mb
PubMed search
- Wikidata
View/Edit Human	View/Edit Mouse

Paired related homeobox 1 is a protein that in humans is encoded by the PRRX1 gene.

== Function ==
The DNA-associated protein encoded by this gene is a member of the paired family of homeobox proteins localized to the nucleus. The protein functions as a transcription coactivator, enhancing the DNA-binding activity of serum response factor, a protein required for the induction of genes by growth and differentiation factors. The protein regulates muscle creatine kinase, indicating a role in the establishment of diverse mesodermal muscle types. Alternative splicing yields two isoforms that differ in abundance and expression patterns.

== Role in mesenchymal stem cell differentiation ==
Prrx1 expression is restricted to the mesoderm during embryonic development, and both Prrx1 and Prrx2 are expressed in mesenchymal tissues in adult mice. Mice that lack both Prrx1 and Prrx2 have profound defects in mesenchymal cell differentiation in the craniofacial region. Several recent studies demonstrate that PRRX1 can regulate differentiation of mesenchymal precursors. For example, PRRX1 inhibits adipogenesis by activating transforming growth factor-beta (TGF-beta) signaling, and also acts downstream of tumor necrosis factor-alpha to inhibit osteoblast differentiation.
