= Cephalic disorder =

Group of congenital brain or skull defects

- Specialty: Medical genetics

Cephalic disorders (from Greek κεφαλή 'head') are congenital conditions that stem from damage to, or abnormal development of, the budding nervous system.

Cephalic disorders are not necessarily caused by a single factor, but may be influenced by hereditary or genetic conditions, nutritional deficiencies, or by environmental exposures during pregnancy, such as medication taken by the mother, maternal infection, or exposure to radiation. Some cephalic disorders occur when the cranial sutures (the fibrous joints that connect the bones of the skull) join prematurely. Most cephalic disorders are caused by a disturbance that occurs very early in the development of the fetal nervous system.

The human nervous system develops from a small, specialized plate of cells on the surface of the embryo. Early in development, this plate of cells forms the neural tube, a narrow sheath that closes between the third and fourth weeks of pregnancy to form the brain and spinal cord of the embryo. Four main processes are responsible for the development of the nervous system: cell proliferation, the process in which nerve cells divide to form new generations of cells; cell migration, the process in which nerve cells move from their place of origin to the place where they will remain for life; cell differentiation, the process during which cells acquire individual characteristics; and apoptosis, a natural process in which cells die.

Damage to the developing nervous system is a major cause of chronic, disabling disorders and, sometimes, death in infants, children, and even adults. The degree to which damage to the developing nervous system harms the mind and body varies enormously. Many disabilities are mild enough to allow those affected to eventually function independently in society, others are not. Some infants, children, and adults die, others remain totally disabled, and an even larger population is partially disabled, functioning well below normal capacity throughout life.

The National Institute of Neurological Disorders and Stroke (NINDS) is currently "conducting and supporting research on normal and abnormal brain and nervous system development."

== Types ==
=== More common cephalic disorders ===
The ICD-10 codes are listed below per disorder.

- Anencephaly (Q00.0)
- Colpocephaly (Q04.8)
- Holoprosencephaly (Q04.2)
- Ethmocephaly (Q04.2)
- Hydranencephaly (Q04.3)
- Iniencephaly (Q00.2)
- Lissencephaly (Q04.3)
- Megalencephaly (Q04.5)
- Microcephaly (Q02)
- Porencephaly (Q04.6)
- Schizencephaly (Q04.6)

=== Less common cephalies ===
- Acephaly (Q00.0)
- Exencephaly (Q00.0)
- Macrocephaly (Q75.3)
- Micrencephaly (Q02)
- Otocephaly (Q18.2)
- Craniosynostosis (Q75.0)
  - Brachycephaly (Q75.0)
  - Oxycephaly (Q75.0)
  - Plagiocephaly (Q67.3)
  - Scaphocephaly (Q75.0)
  - Trigonocephaly (Q75.0)
- Polycephaly (Q89.4)

== See also ==
- Cyclopia
- Encephalocele
- MOMO syndrome
- Positional plagiocephaly

== Notes ==
- Note 1: https://web.archive.org/web/20051001003618/http://www.ninds.nih.gov/disorders/cephalic_disorders/cephalic_disorders.htm

Portions of this article were based on the page: https://web.archive.org/web/20080920160408/http://www.ninds.nih.gov/disorders/cephalic_disorders/detail_cephalic_disorders.htm at the National Institute of Neurological Disorders and Stroke's public domain resource.
