= PCDH17 =

Protein-coding gene in the species Homo sapiens

Identifiers
- Aliases: PCDH17, PCDH68, PCH68, protocadherin 17
- External IDs: OMIM: 611760; MGI: 2684924; GeneCards: PCDH17

Gene location (Human)
Chr.	Chromosome 13 (human)
Band	13q21.1	Start	57,631,744 bp
Band	13q21.1	End	57,729,311 bp

Gene location (Mouse)
Chr.	Chromosome 14 (mouse)
Band	14|14 D3	Start	84,681,003 bp
Band	14|14 D3	End	84,776,442 bp
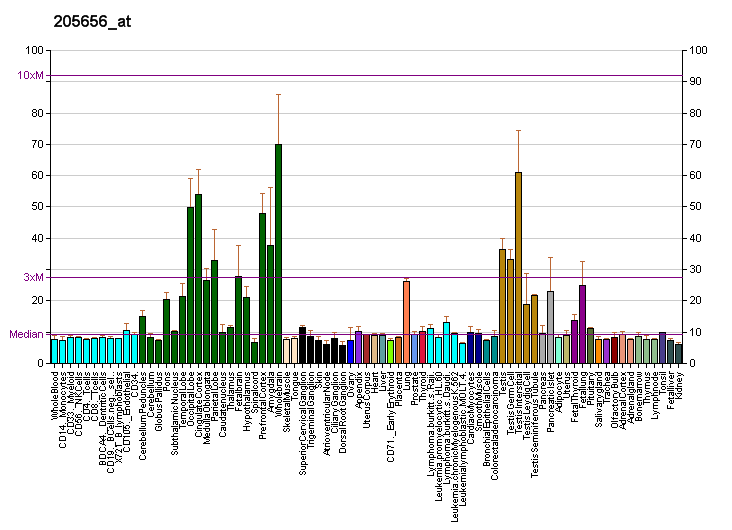
RNA expression pattern
Bgee	Human / Mouse (ortholog); Top expressed in: endothelial cell; visceral pleura; sperm; Brodmann area 23; entorhinal cortex; lower lobe of lung; pars reticulata; superior vestibular nucleus; germinal epithelium; ventral tegmental area / Top expressed in: lateral hypothalamus; ventromedial nucleus; dorsomedial hypothalamic nucleus; anterior amygdaloid area; mammillary body; lateral septal nucleus; paraventricular nucleus of hypothalamus; ventral tegmental area; arcuate nucleus; supraoptic nucleus; More reference expression data
BioGPS	More reference expression data
Gene ontology
Molecular function	calcium ion binding; protein binding
Cellular component	integral component of membrane; plasma membrane; membrane; integral component of plasma membrane; glutamatergic synapse; GABA-ergic synapse; integral component of postsynaptic membrane; integral component of presynaptic membrane
Biological process	presynaptic active zone assembly; adult behavior; regulation of synaptic vesicle clustering; negative regulation of synaptic transmission; homophilic cell adhesion via plasma membrane adhesion molecules; cell adhesion; cell-cell signaling; synapse assembly; synaptic membrane adhesion
Sources:Amigo / QuickGO
Orthologs
Databases	NCBI: entry; OMA: entry
Species	Human	Mouse
Entrez	27253	219228
Ensembl	ENSG00000118946	ENSMUSG00000035566
UniProt	O14917	n/a
RefSeq (mRNA)	NM_001040429; NM_014459	NM_001013753
RefSeq (protein)	NP_001035519	n/a
Location (UCSC)	Chr 13: 57.63 – 57.73 Mb	Chr 14: 84.68 – 84.78 Mb
PubMed search
- Wikidata
View/Edit Human	View/Edit Mouse

Protocadherin-17 is a protein that in humans is encoded by the PCDH17 gene.

This gene belongs to the protocadherin gene family, a subfamily of the cadherin superfamily. The encoded protein contains six extracellular cadherin domains, a transmembrane domain, and a cytoplasmic tail differing from those of the classical cadherins. The encoded protein may play a role in the establishment and function of specific cell-cell connections in the brain. PCDH17 promoter methylation is found to be closely associated with bladder cancer malignancy
