= Acrorenal mandibular syndrome =

- Symptoms: Renal agenesis, split foot, split hand, kidney abnormalities, radius hypoplasia, and ulna hypoplasia.
- Usual onset: Neonatal, Antenatal
- Causes: Genetics
- Frequency: <1 / 1 000 000>

Acrorenal mandibular syndrome is an extremely rare multiple congenital anomalies syndrome characterized by skeletal and renal abnormalities. These anomalies include split hand and split foot malformations, renal agenesis, polycystic kidneys, uterine malformations, and underdeveloped or absent bones. Although the cause of Acrorenal mandibular syndrome is unknown, it is thought to be autosomal recessive.

== Signs and symptoms ==
Some characteristic features of Acrorenal mandibular syndrome include a high-arched palate, split foot, split hand, absent or malformed kidneys, absent tibiae, absent fibula, underdevelopment of the radius, and underdevelopment of the ulna.

Although less likely, those with Acrorenal mandibular syndrome may also have abnormalities of the collar bones, abnormal sense of smell, abnormalities of the uterus, hip dislocations, underdevelopment of the zygomatic bone, low-set posteriorly rotated ears, micrognathia, pectus carinatum, underdeveloped lungs, and a short neck.

Acrorenal mandibular syndrome can cause intrauterine growth retardation. During pregnancy, mothers of newborns with Acrorenal mandibular syndrome may have less amniotic fluid.

== Causes ==
Although Acrorenal mandibular syndrome is thought to be autosomal recessive, the syndrome is more common in female children born from consanguineous marriages.
