= Spastic paresis (cattle) =

Congenital disease of cattle by permanent stretching of gastrocnemius muscle

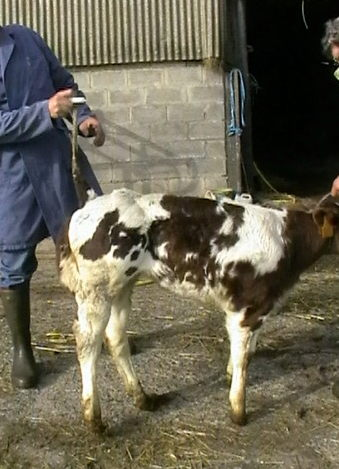
right limb

Spastic paresis is a congenital disorder of cattle.

It is due to contraction of gastrocnemius muscle, which develops within the first 6 months of life.

It can be unilateral or bilateral.

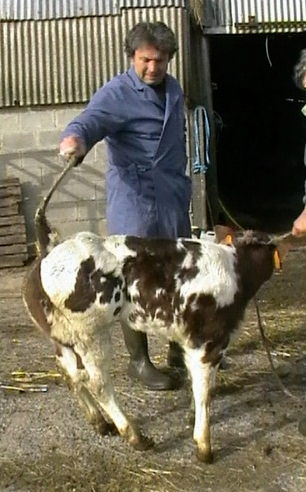
right limb stretched beforehand

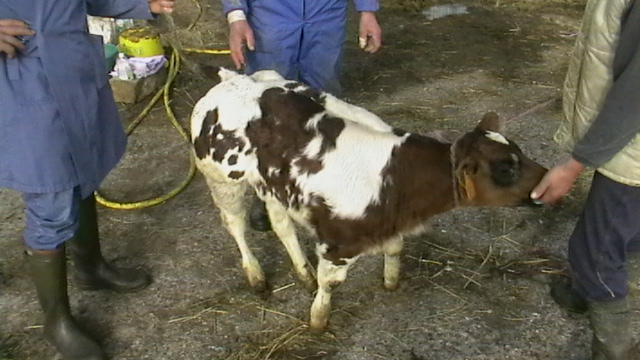
special stance of same affected calve

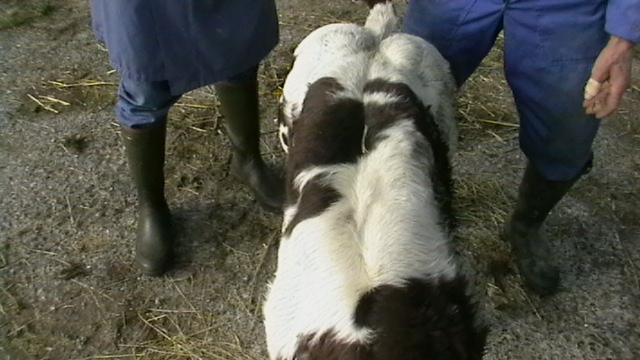
asymmetric back (compensatory development of left side muscles)

bilateral, in a one-year-old heifer

== Treatment ==
Treatment by partial tenotomy of insertions of the gastrocnemius muscle and the calcanean tendon sheath (hock joint) has been abandoned.

Neurectomy of gastrocnemius muscle nerves demands strong retractors, nerve electric stimulators (to avoid section of sensitive branches) and good knowledge of limb innervation.

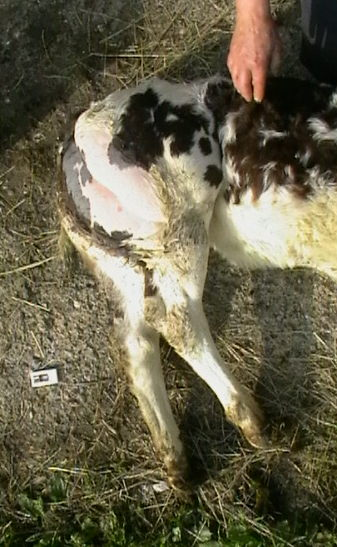
shaving

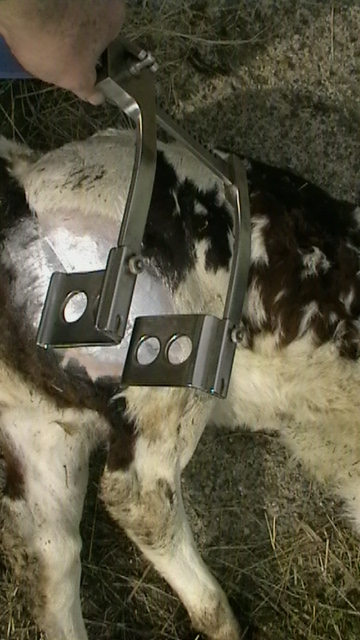
retractor (just laying on calve)

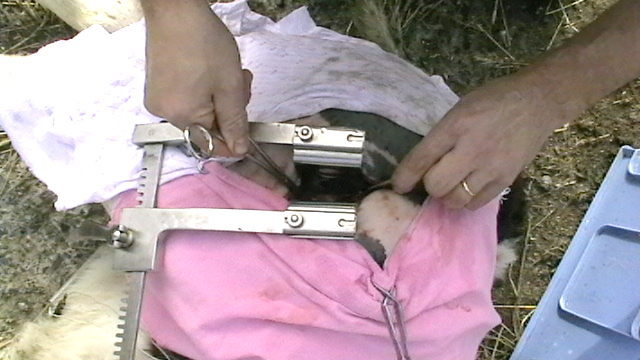
placement of retractors

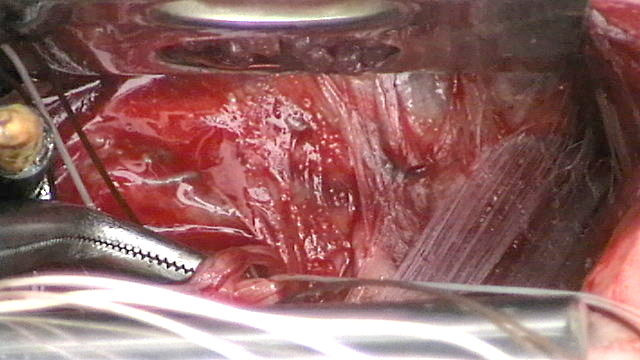
nerves to be sectioned

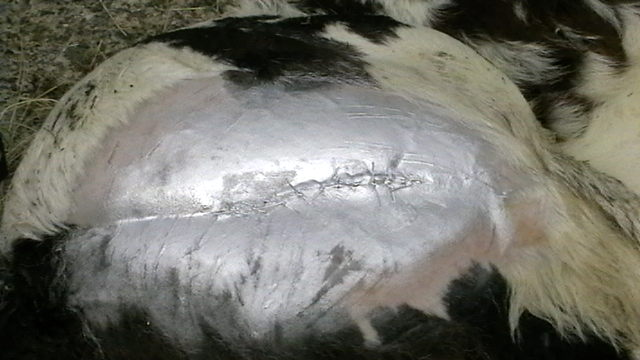
sutures
