= Microstomia =

Abnormally small mouth

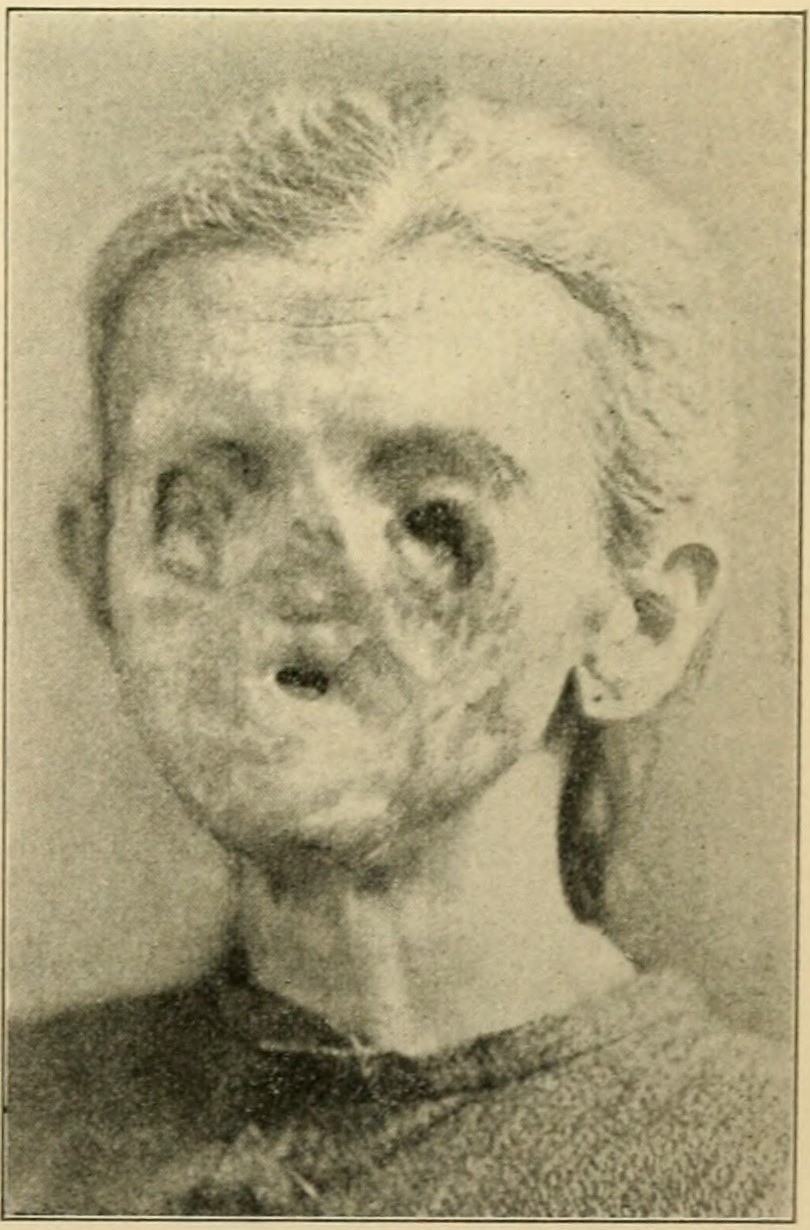
- Acquired microstomia from congenital syphilis
- Specialty: Medical genetics

Microstomia (from Greek micro- 'small' and -stomia 'mouth') is the medical condition of an abnormally small mouth.

== Congenital ==
It is a feature of many craniofacial syndromes, including Freeman–Sheldon syndrome and Sheldon-Hall syndromes (or distal arthrogryposis multiplex congenita). It may present with whistling-face feature, as well, as in Freeman-Sheldon syndrome. In this syndrome, it impairs alimentation and may require repeated oral surgeries (called commissurotomy) to improve function.

== Acquired ==
Microstomia can occur as a result of scarring due to many conditions. It is seen as complication of facial burns. It can also be a feature of systemic scleroderma.

== Treatments and Therapy ==
Acquired microstomia is most often managed with surgical intervention, the use of microstomia prevention appliances, compression garments, and exercises prescribed by a speech or occupational therapist. Surgical procedures aim to release scar tension through tissue grafting or repositioning. Therapists will often stretch the affected tissues with the use of intraoral appliances, manual manipulation, or exercises that stretch the scars and surrounding tissues. Early and consistent intervention is important, especially following a burn injury or the diagnosis of scleroderma, and should always be under the direction of a certified healthcare professional.
