= Agenesis of the corpus callosum =

Birth defect of the development of the brain

- Specialty: Neurology

Agenesis of the corpus callosum (ACC) is a rare birth defect in which there is a complete or partial absence of the corpus callosum. It occurs when the development of the corpus callosum, the band of white matter connecting the two hemispheres in the brain, in the embryo is disrupted. The result of this is that the fibers that would otherwise form the corpus callosum are instead longitudinally oriented along the ipsilateral ventricular wall and form structures called Probst bundles.

In addition to agenesis, other degrees of callosal defects exist, including hypoplasia (underdevelopment or thinness), hypogenesis (partial agenesis) or dysgenesis (malformation).

ACC is found in many syndromes and can often present alongside hypoplasia of the cerebellar vermis. When this is the case, there can also be an enlarged fourth ventricle or hydrocephalus; this is called Dandy–Walker malformation.

== Signs and symptoms ==
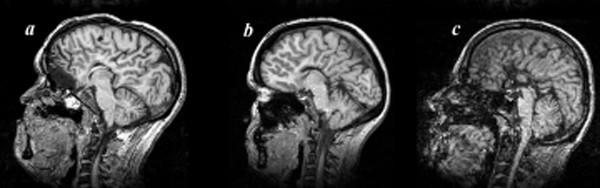
MRI images of three patients in the sagittal plane. A and B: Complete agenesis of the corpus callosum. C: Complete agenesis of both the corpus callosum and the anterior commissure.

Laboratory research has demonstrated that individuals with ACC have difficulty transferring more complex information from one hemisphere to the other. They also have been shown to have some cognitive disabilities (difficulty in complex problem solving) and social difficulties (missing subtle social cues), even when their intelligence quotient is normal. Recent research suggests that specific social difficulties may be a result of impaired face processing. It has also been strongly associated with autism.

Other characteristics sometimes associated with callosal disorders include seizures, spasticity, early feeding difficulties and/or gastric reflux, hearing impairments, abnormal head and facial features, and intellectual disability.

=== Associated brain anomalies ===
Brain anomalies that can sometimes occur in syndromes that cause callosal disorders include:

- Aplasia of the cerebellar vermis
- Chiari malformation
- Colpocephaly
- Dandy–Walker syndrome
- Holoprosencephaly
- Hydrocephalus
- Neuronal migration disorders such as grey matter heterotopia
- Schizencephaly

== Causes ==
Agenesis of the corpus callosum is caused by disruption to development of the fetal brain between the 3rd and 12th weeks of pregnancy. In most cases, it is not possible to know what caused an individual to have ACC or another callosal disorder. However, research suggests that some possible causes may include chromosome errors, inherited genetic factors, prenatal infections or injuries, prenatal toxic exposures, structural blockage by cysts or other brain abnormalities and metabolic disorders.

=== Ciliopathies: rare genetic disorders ===
Until recently, the medical literature did not indicate a connection among many genetic disorders, both genetic syndromes and genetic diseases, that are now being found to be related. As a result of new genetic research, some of these are, in fact, highly related in their root cause despite the widely varying symptoms apparent on clinical examination. Agenesis of the corpus callosum is one such disease, part of an emerging class of diseases called ciliopathies. The underlying cause may be a dysfunctional molecular mechanism in the primary cilia structures of the cell organelles that are present in many cellular types throughout the human body. The cilia defects adversely affect "numerous critical developmental signaling pathways" essential to cellular development and thus offer a plausible hypothesis for the often multi-symptom nature of a large set of syndromes and diseases. Known ciliopathies include primary ciliary dyskinesia, Bardet–Biedl syndrome, polycystic kidney and liver disease, nephronophthisis, Alström syndrome, Meckel–Gruber syndrome and some forms of retinal degeneration.

=== Drug exposure ===
In utero exposure to cocaine, heroin, amphetamines and phenylpropanolamine can lead to agenesis of corpus callosum.

== Diagnosis ==
Callosal disorders can be diagnosed through brain imaging studies or during autopsy. They may be diagnosed through an MRI, CT scan, Sonography, prenatal ultrasound, or prenatal MRI.

== Treatment ==
There are currently no specific medical treatments for callosal disorders, but individuals with ACC and other callosal disorders may benefit from a range of developmental therapies, educational support, and services. It is important to consult with a variety of medical, health, educational, and social work professionals. Such professionals include neurologists, neuropsychologists, occupational therapists, physical therapists, speech and language pathologists, pediatricians, recreation therapists, music therapists, geneticists, social workers, special educators, early childhood intervention specialists, and caregivers for adults.

== Prognosis ==
Prognosis varies depending on the type of callosal abnormality and associated conditions or syndromes. It is not possible for the corpus callosum to regenerate.

== Culture ==
Kim Peek, inspiration for the film Rain Man and renowned for his savant abilities, was born with agenesis of the corpus callosum, along with macrocephaly and damage to the cerebellum.
