= Holoprosencephaly =

Failure of the forebrain to develop into two hemispheres during embryonic growth

- Diagram depicting the main subdivisions of the embryonic vertebrate brain.
- Specialty: Medical genetics, Neurology, Embryology
- Usual onset: During embryonic development
- Types: Alobar, Lobar, Semilobar, Cyclopia, Cebocephaly, Ethmocephaly
- Causes: Fused brain hemispheres
- Treatment: Supportive care

Holoprosencephaly (HPE) is a cephalic disorder in which the prosencephalon (the forebrain of the embryo) fails to develop into two hemispheres, typically occurring between the 18th and 28th day of gestation. Normally, the forebrain is formed and the face begins to develop in the fifth and sixth weeks of human pregnancy. The condition also occurs in other species.

When the embryo's forebrain does not divide to form bilateral cerebral hemispheres (the left and right halves of the brain), it causes defects in the development of the face and in brain structure and function. Holoprosencephaly is estimated to occur in approximately 1 in every 250 conceptions; most cases are not compatible with life and result in fetal death in utero due to deformities to the skull and brain. However, holoprosencephaly is still estimated to occur in approximately 1 in every 8,000 live births.

The severity of holoprosencephaly in viable infants is highly variable. In less severe cases, babies are born with normal or near-normal brain development and facial deformities that may affect the eyes, nose, and upper lip. In other cases, there are substantial cognitive and physical disabilities.

== Signs and symptoms ==
Symptoms of holoprosencephaly range from mild (no facial/organ defects, anosmia, or only a single central incisor) to severe (cyclopia). The symptoms are dependent upon the classification type.There are four classifications of holoprosencephaly, as well as a mild "microform" variant.

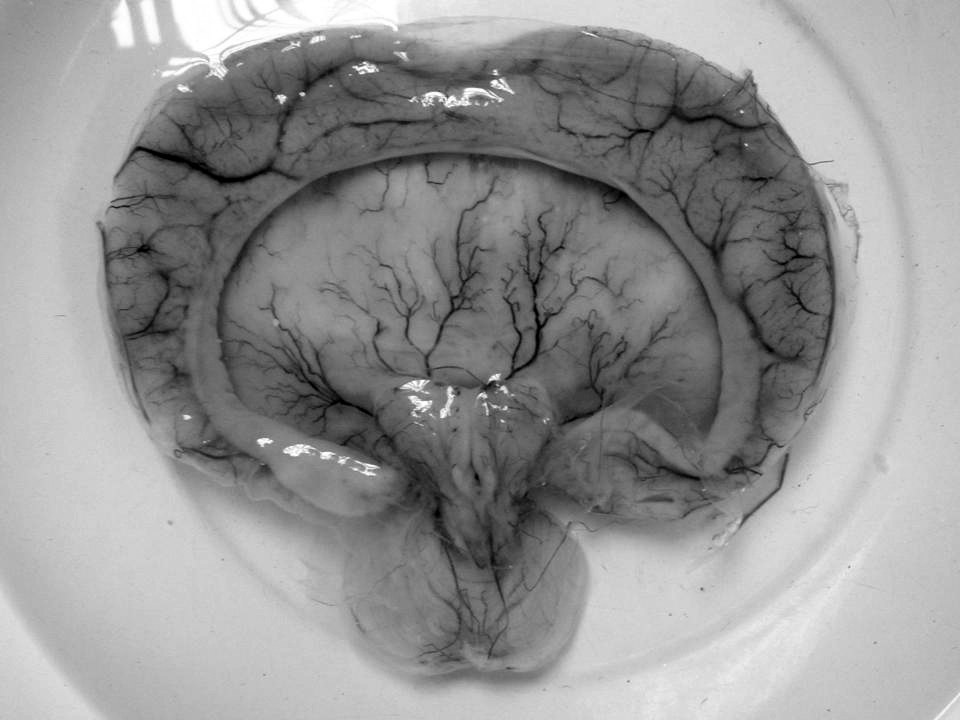
Gross pathology specimen from a case of alobar holoprosencephaly

Alobar
The most severe form of holoprosencephaly, this includes formation of synophthalmia (a single central eye), proboscis, and severe impairment.
Semilobar
Can present with severely decreased distance between eyes, a flat nasal bridge, eye defects, cleft lip and palate, and severe impairment.
Lobar
Can present with decreased distance between eyes, a flat nasal bridge, closely spaced nostrils and shallow philtrum. Mental and locomotion delays may also be present.
Syntelencephaly or middle interhemispheric variant of holoprosencephaly (MIHV)
Mild phenotypic presentation which can present with flat nasal bridge, metopic prominence, shallow philtrum, and possible mental and locomotion delays.
Microform
Mild phenotypic presentation with reduced distance between eyes, sharp nasal bridge, single maxillary central incisor.

== Causes ==
In holoprosencephaly, the neural tube fails to segment, resulting in incomplete separation of the prosencephalon at the fifth week of gestation. According to one hypothesis, the holoprosencephalic brain is due to an incomplete axial twisting. According to the axial twist theory, each side of the brain represents its opposite body side because the anterior part of the head, including the forebrain, is turned around by a twisting along the body axis during early development. Accordingly, holoprosencephaly is possibly an extreme form of Yakovlevian torque.

The exact cause(s) of HPE are yet to be determined. Mutations in the gene encoding the SHH protein, which is involved in the development of the central nervous system (CNS), can cause holoprosencephaly. In other cases, it often seems that there is no specific cause at all.

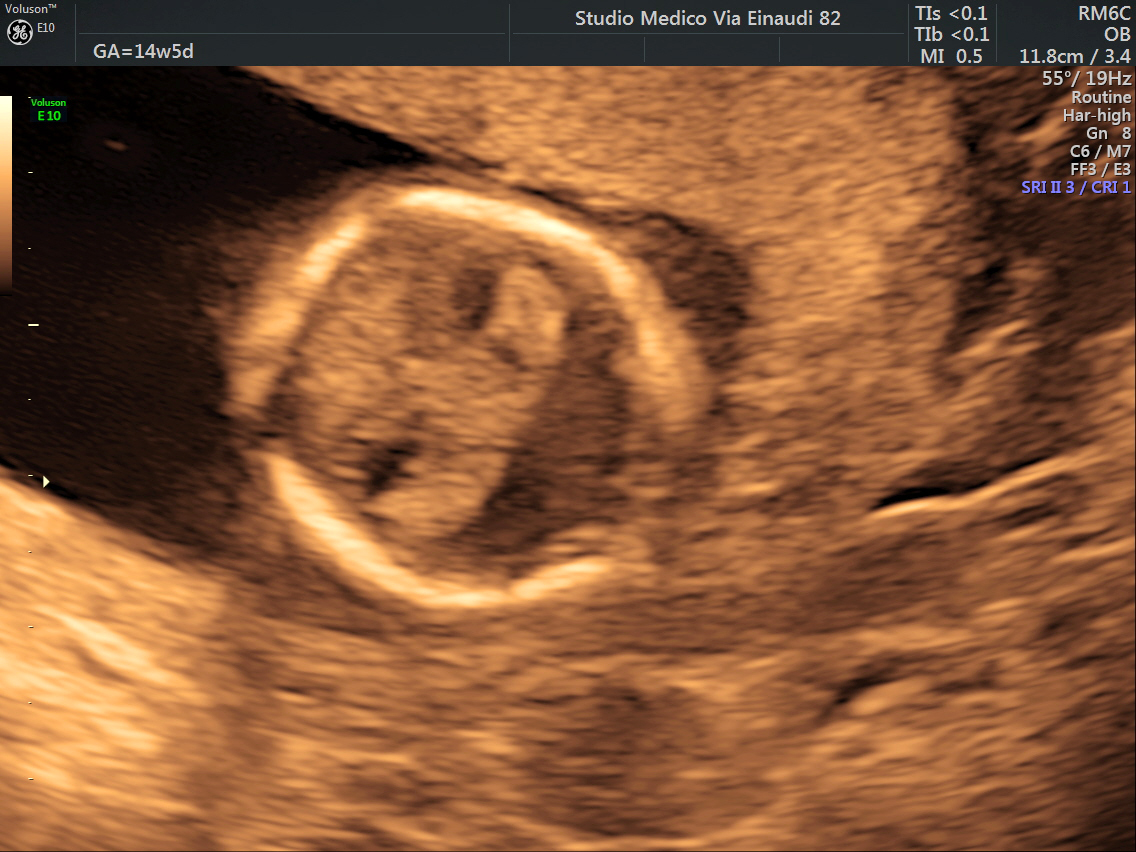
Ultrasound scan of a fetal head at 14 weeks of pregnancy with partial absence of the midline

=== Genetics ===
Armand Marie Leroi describes the cause of cyclopia as a genetic malfunctioning during the process by which the embryonic brain is divided into two. Only later does the visual cortex take recognizable form, and at this point an individual with a single forebrain region will be likely to have a single, possibly rather large, eye (when fetuses with separate cerebral hemispheres would have two eyes).

Increases in expression of such genes as Pax-2, as well as inhibition of Pax-6, from the notochord have been implicated in normal differentiation of cephalic midline structures. Inappropriate expression of any of these genes may result in mild to severe forms of holoprosencephaly. Other candidate genes have been located, including the SHH (holoprosencephaly type 3 a.k.a. HPE3), TGIF1, ZIC2, SIX3 and BOC genes.Although many children with holoprosencephaly have normal chromosomes, specific chromosomal abnormalities have been identified in some patients (trisomy of chromosome 13, also known as Patau syndrome). There is evidence that in some families, HPE is inherited (autosomal dominant as well as autosomal or X-linked recessive inheritance). Features consistent with familial transmission of the disease (e.g., a single central maxillary incisor) should be carefully assessed in parents and family members.

=== Non-genetic factors ===
Numerous possible risk factors have been identified, including gestational diabetes, transplacental infections (the "TORCH complex"), first trimester bleeding, and a history of miscarriage. As well, the disorder is found twice as often in female babies. However, there appears to be no correlation between HPE and maternal age.

There is evidence of a correlation between HPE and the use of various drugs classified as being potentially unsafe for pregnant and lactating mothers. These include insulin, birth control pills, aspirin, lithium, thorazine, retinoic acid, and anticonvulsants. There is also a correlation between alcohol consumption and HPE, along with nicotine, the toxins in cigarettes and toxins in cigarette smoke when used during pregnancy.

== Diagnosis ==
Holoprosencephaly is typically diagnosed during fetal development when there are abnormalities found on fetal brain imaging, but it can also be diagnosed after birth. The protocol for diagnosis includes neuroimaging (Ultrasound or fetal MRI prior to birth or Ultrasound, MRI or CT post birth), syndrome evaluation, cytogenetics, molecular testing, and genetic counseling.There are four classifications of holoprosencephaly as well as a "microform". These classifications can be distinguished by their anatomical differences.

- Alobar holoprosencephaly
  - Small single forebrain ventricle
  - No interhemispheric division
  - Absence of olfactory bulbs and tracts
  - Absence of corpus callosum
  - Non separation of deep gray nuclei
- Semilobar holoprosencephaly
  - Rudimentary cerebral lobes
  - Incomplete interhemispheric division
  - Absence or hypoplasia of olfactory bulbs and tracts
  - Absence of corpus callosum
  - Varying non separation of deep gray nuclei
- Lobar holoprosencephaly
  - Fully-developed cerebral lobes
  - Distinct interhemispheric division
  - Midline continuous frontal neocortex
  - Absent, hypoplasic or normal corpus callosum
  - Separation of deep gray nuclei
- Syntelencephaly, or middle interhemispheric variant of holoprosencephaly (MIHV)
  - Failure of separation of the posterior frontal and parietal lobes
  - Callosal genu and splenium normally formed
  - Absence of corpus callosum
  - Hypothalamus and lentiform nuclei normally separated
  - Heterotopic gray matter
- Microform
  - Subtle defects of corpus callosum
  - Subtle midline brain defects

== Treatment ==
There is no cure for holoprosencephaly. Treatment is symptomatic and supportive.

== Prognosis ==
HPE is not a condition in which the brain deteriorates over time. Although serious seizure disorders, autonomic dysfunction, complicated endocrine disorders and other life-threatening conditions may sometimes be associated with HPE, the mere presence of HPE does not mean that these serious problems will occur or develop over time without any previous indication or warning. These abnormalities are usually recognized shortly after birth or early in life and only occur if areas of the brain controlling those functions are fused, malformed or absent.

Prognosis is dependent upon the degree of fusion and malformation of the brain, as well as other health complications that may be present.The more severe forms of encephalopathy are usually fatal. This disorder consists of a spectrum of defects, malformations and associated abnormalities. Disability is based upon the degree in which the brain is affected. Moderate to severe defects may cause intellectual disability, spastic quadriparesis, athetoid movements, endocrine disorders, epilepsy and other serious conditions; mild brain defects may only cause learning or behavior problems with few motor impairments.

Seizures may develop over time with the highest risk before 2 years of age and the onset of puberty. Most are managed with one medication or a combination of medications. Typically, seizures that are difficult to control appear soon after birth, requiring more aggressive medication combinations/doses.

Most children with HPE are at risk of having elevated blood sodium levels during moderate-severe illnesses that alter fluid intake/output, even if they have no previous diagnosis of diabetes insipidus or hypernatremia.

== See also ==
- Cephalic disorder
- Cyclopia
- Prenatal development
