= Hand (disambiguation) =

A hand is a body part.

Hand or HAND may also refer to:

== Arts, entertainment, and media ==
=== Fictional entities ===
- Hand, a son of Albion in the mythology of William Blake
- Crazy Hand and Master Hand, two characters in the Super Smash Bros. series
- King's Hand, a top advisor to a king in A Song of Fire and Ice and Game of Thrones
- The Hand (Babylon 5), an alien race in the television series Babylon 5 (1994–1997)
- The Hand (comics), an organization in the Marvel Comics universe
- The Hand, creator of Nebula Man in the DC Comics universe

=== Films ===
- The Hand (1960 film), by Henry Cass
- The Hand (1965 film), by Jiří Trnka
- The Hand (1981 film), a 1981 horror film by Oliver Stone
- The Hand, a short film by Wong Kar-Wai, part of the film Eros (2004)

=== Music ===
- "Hand", a 1999 song by Jars of Clay from the album If I Left the Zoo
- The Hand, a side project of American rock band Johnny Society

=== Other uses in arts, entertainment, and media ===
- Hand (card games)
- Handwriting, an individual's style of writing
- Hand or handwriting script, an established style of handwritten documents
  - Chancery hand
  - Round hand
  - Secretary hand
  - Shorthand
  - Book hand
- The Hand (journal)
- The Hand (Botero), sculpture by Fernando Botero
- The Hand, part of the comic Shiver and Shake
- The Hand, a 1930 work by Salvador Dalí
- The Hand, a Stand used by Okuyasu Nijimura in JoJo's Bizarre Adventure: Diamond Is Unbreakable
- h.a.n.d., a Japanese video game developer

== Biology and healthcare ==
- HAND1, a human gene
- HAND2, a human gene
- HIV-associated neurocognitive disorder, or HAND

== Places ==
- Hand, South Carolina, a community in the United States
- Hand County, South Dakota, a county in the United States
- Hand Lake, a lake in Minnesota

== Professions ==
- service hand, meaning (unskilled or semi-skilled) worker
- ranch hand
- ship's hand (sailor)
- stagehand

== Other uses ==
- Glossary of bowling § Hand, a measure of hand position in bowling ball deliveries
- Hand (hieroglyph), an alphabetic hieroglyph with the meaning of "d"
- Hand (unit), a measurement, primarily of a horse's height
- Hand (surname)
- Hand, part of a clock face: hour hand, minute hand, or second hand
- ☞, hand, or index, a punctuation mark
- Hand feel, the property of fabrics related to the touch that expresses sensory comfort
- Hand of Eris, a symbol simply called The Hand in the religion of Discordianism

== See also ==
- Handmade (disambiguation)
- Hands (disambiguation)
- Hand pay, a slot machine payment made by a cashier
- Handjob, a sexual term
- Justice Hand (disambiguation)
- Mr. Hand (disambiguation)
