= Hand (surname) =

Hand is a surname. Notable people with the surname include:

- Ann Hand, American jewelry designer
- Augustus C. Hand (1803–1878), American politician from New York
- Augustus Noble Hand (1869–1954), American jurist
- Bill Hand (1898–?), English footballer
- Brad Hand (born 1990), American baseball player
- Daithí Hand, Irish hurling manager
- Da'Shawn Hand (born 1995), American football player
- David Hand (bishop) (1918–2006), Anglican Archbishop of Papua New Guinea
- David Hand (animator) (1900–1986), American animator and director
- David Hand (statistician) (born 1950), British statistician
- Debra Hand, American artist
- Dora Hand (c. 1844–1878), American dance hall singer
- Earl Hand (1897–1954), Canadian military aviator
- Edward Hand (1744–1802), American Revolutionary War general
- Elizabeth Hand (born 1957), American author
- Eoin Hand (born 1946), Irish footballer, manager and sports commentator
- Faron Hand (born 1973), American basketball player
- Fionn Hand (born 1998), Irish cricketer
- Frederic Hand (born 1947), composer
- Gerry Hand (1942–2023), Australian politician
- Harrison Hand (born 1998), American football player
- Jack Hand (1912–1995), American sports reporter
- James Hand (born 1986), Irish footballer
- James Hand (musician) (1952–2020), American country-music singer and songwriter
- Jamie Hand (born 1984), English footballer
- Jeffrey Lynn Hand (1949–1978), American suspected serial killer
- Jessica Hand, British diplomat
- John Hand (rower) (1902–1967), Canadian rower
- John Hand (priest), Irish priest
- John P. Hand (1850–1923), American jurist
- Jon Hand (born 1963), American football player
- Kelli Hand (1964–2021), American techno musician and DJ
- Kenneth Hand (1899–1988), American politician from New Jersey
- Learned Hand (1872–1961), American judge from New York
- Lloyd Nelson Hand (born 1929), American public official
- Nevyl Hand (1923–2014), Australian rugby player
- Norman Hand (1972–2010), American football player
- Owen Hand (1938–2003), Scottish folk singer
- Peter Hand, Prussian founder of the Peter Hand Brewing Company in Chicago, US
- Rich Hand (born 1948), American baseball player
- Robert Hand (born 1942), American astrologer
- T. Millet Hand (1902–1956), American politician from New Jersey
- Tony Hand (born 1967), Scottish ice hockey player
- William Hand, yacht designer

Handt is a surname. Notable people with the surname include:

- Angelika Handt (born 1954), German sprinter
- Johann Christian Simon Handt (1794–1863), German-born Australian minister

== See also ==
- Mr. Hand (disambiguation)
- Hands (surname)
- Handel (disambiguation)
- Handle (disambiguation)
- Hendl
- Hendel
