= Hands (disambiguation) =

Hands is the plural of hand, a body part.

(The) Hands may also refer to:

== Film and television ==
- The Hands (film), a 2006 Argentinean-Italian film
- Hands (TV series), a 1978–89 Irish craft TV series
- "Hands" (The Bear), a season one episode of The Bear TV series

== Music ==
=== Bands ===
- Hands (indie rock band), an American indie rock band
- Hands (metal band), an American Christian metal band
- The Hands, an Australian band led by Clayton Doley

=== Albums & EPs ===
- Hands (Bumblefoot album), by Ron "Bumblefoot" Thal
- Hands (Little Boots album), the debut studio album of Little Boots
- Hands (Dave Holland and Pepe Habichuela album)
- Hands (EP), by Emanuel and the Fear
- Hands, by Eri Nobuchika

=== Songs ===
- "Hands" (2016 song), a charity song by various artists to raise money for victims of the 2016 Orlando nightclub shooting
- "Hands" (Jewel song), a song by Jewel Kilcher
- "Hands" (Mike Perry song)
- "Hands" (Kumi Koda song)
- "Hands" (The Raconteurs song)
- "Hands" (The Ting Tings song)
- "Hands", a song from Rounds by Four Tet
- "Hands", a song from Planet Shining by m-flo
- "Hands", a song by Spratleys Japs
- "Hands", a song by Kylie Minogue

== People ==
- Hands (surname)

== Other uses ==
- Hands (store) (formerly Tokyu Hands), a Japanese chain of department stores
- Hand(s), alien(s) from The Eternaut, an Argentine comic
- Hands (advertisement), a controversial political advertisement aired on television during the 1990 United States Senate election in North Carolina
- Hands, common euphemism for slaves in the United States; see glossary of American slavery

== See also ==
- Hand (disambiguation)
- Mr. Hands (disambiguation)
- Ranch hand
- Stagehand
