= Handmade =

Handmade or hand made may refer to:

- Handicraft, where useful and decorative objects are made by hand
- Handmade (Jimmy Rankin album), 2003
- Handmade (Hindi Zahra album), 2010
- Handmade (The Ongoing Concept album), 2015
- Handmade, a 1970 album by Mason Williams
- Hand Made, a 1993 album by Mitchel Forman
- HandMade Films, a British film production and distribution company
- Handmade: Britain's Best Woodworker, a British reality television series
- Handmade, a former division of the Rhino Entertainment record label
- Handmade, a web series produced by Eater

== See also ==
- Handmaid, a personal maid or female servant
- The Handmaid (disambiguation)
- Made hand, a poker hand that does not need improvement to win
