= Handle (disambiguation) =

A handle is a grip attached to an object for using or moving the object.

Handle may also refer to:

== Arts, entertainment, and media ==
- Handles (novel), a children's book by Jan Mark
- Handles, a character in the Doctor Who episode "The Time of the Doctor"

== Computing and technology ==
- Handle (computing), an abstract reference to a resource
- Handle, in a communication system, is a:
  - Pseudonym
  - User name
- Handle, in computer programming, is an opaque pointer, i.e., a datatype that hides its internal implementation using a pointer
- Adjustment handles, little boxes for resizing a GUI control
- Handle System, a system for uniquely numbering digital objects
- Handle-o-Meter, a machine that measures surface friction and flexibility of sheeted materials
- Handle, a robot created by Boston Dynamics

== Other uses ==
- Handle (mathematics), a topological ball
- Handle, in gambling, is the total amount bet, usually at a given place or for a given event
- Handle, a half-gallon (1.75 L) bottle of liquor; see alcohol measurements

== See also ==
- Handel (disambiguation)
- Hendel
- Hendl
