= TCF21 =

Protein-coding gene in the species Homo sapiens

Identifiers
- Aliases: TCF21, POD1, bHLHa23, transcription factor 21
- External IDs: OMIM: 603306; MGI: 1202715; GeneCards: TCF21

Gene location (Human)
Chr.	Chromosome 6 (human)
Band	6q23.2	Start	133,889,113 bp
Band	6q23.2	End	133,895,553 bp

Gene location (Mouse)
Chr.	Chromosome 10 (mouse)
Band	10 A3|10 10.33 cM	Start	22,693,180 bp
Band	10 A3|10 10.33 cM	End	22,696,073 bp
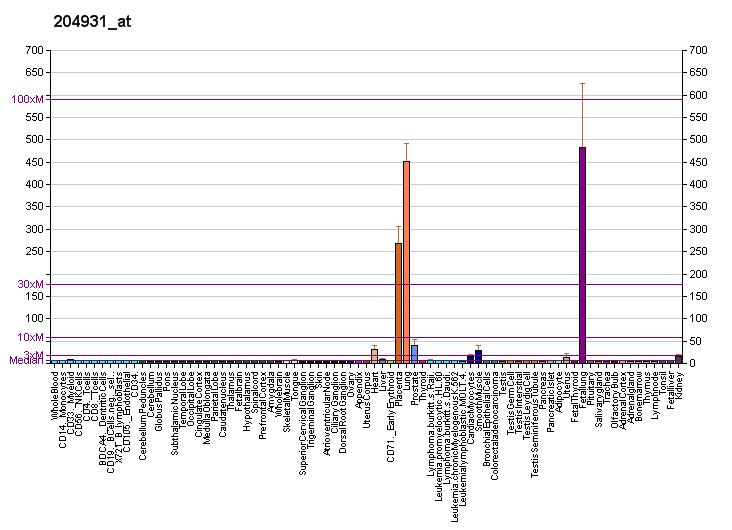
RNA expression pattern
Bgee	Human / Mouse (ortholog); Top expressed in: gonad; right lung; upper lobe of left lung; left ovary; right ovary; lower lobe of lung; glomerulus; spleen; metanephric glomerulus; right auricle of heart / Top expressed in: left lung lobe; vas deferens; Gonadal ridge; efferent ductule; right lung lobe; migratory enteric neural crest cell; stroma of kidney; septum transversum; atrium; endocardial cushion; More reference expression data
BioGPS	More reference expression data
Gene ontology
Molecular function	DNA binding; protein dimerization activity; DNA-binding transcription activator activity, RNA polymerase II-specific; histone deacetylase binding; DNA-binding transcription repressor activity, RNA polymerase II-specific; bHLH transcription factor binding; E-box binding; androgen receptor binding; DNA-binding transcription factor activity, RNA polymerase II-specific
Cellular component	nucleus
Biological process	roof of mouth development; ureteric bud development; regulation of transcription, DNA-templated; epithelial cell differentiation; lung morphogenesis; diaphragm development; kidney development; metanephric mesenchymal cell differentiation; negative regulation of androgen receptor signaling pathway; bronchiole development; Sertoli cell differentiation; glomerulus development; sex differentiation; negative regulation of transcription by RNA polymerase II; spleen development; transcription by RNA polymerase II; morphogenesis of a branching structure; transcription, DNA-templated; reproductive structure development; metanephric glomerular capillary formation; branching involved in ureteric bud morphogenesis; vasculature development; sex-determination system; respiratory system development; embryonic digestive tract morphogenesis; animal organ morphogenesis; lung alveolus development; lung vasculature development; branchiomeric skeletal muscle development; positive regulation of transcription by RNA polymerase II; gland development
Sources:Amigo / QuickGO
Orthologs
Databases	NCBI: entry; OMA: entry
Species	Human	Mouse
Entrez	6943	21412
Ensembl	ENSG00000118526	ENSMUSG00000045680
UniProt	O43680	O35437
RefSeq (mRNA)	NM_198392; NM_003206	NM_011545
RefSeq (protein)	NP_003197; NP_938206	NP_035675
Location (UCSC)	Chr 6: 133.89 – 133.9 Mb	Chr 10: 22.69 – 22.7 Mb
PubMed search
- Wikidata
View/Edit Human	View/Edit Mouse

Transcription factor 21 (TCF21), also known as pod-1, capsuling, or epicardin, is a protein that in humans is encoded by the TCF21 gene on chromosome 6. It is ubiquitously expressed in many tissues and cell types and highly significantly expressed in lung and placenta. TCF21 is crucial for the development of a number of cell types during embryogenesis of the heart, lung, kidney, and spleen. TCF21 is also deregulated in several types of cancers, and thus known to function as a tumor suppressor. The TCF21 gene also contains one of 27 SNPs associated with increased risk of coronary artery disease.

== Discovery ==
TCF21 was discovered in 1998 when search for novel cell-type-specific bHLH proteins expressed in human and mouse kidneys by performing a search of the expressed sequence tag (EST) databases. Because the transcript they found was highly expressed in visceral glomerular epithelial cells (podocytes), TCF21 was initialled named Pod-1. Comparison of Pod-1 with previously characterized bHLH proteins identified Pod-1 as a novel member of a subfamily of bHLH proteins with important roles in mesodermal development. The chromosomal location of Pod-1 in the mouse was then determined using an interspecific backcross panel along with genomic southern blot analysis to identify restriction fragment length polymorphisms (RFLPs) between inbred mouse strains. Analysis showed Pod-1 to map to a region of mouse chromosome 10 that is syntenic with human chromosome 6q23-q24.

The tissue distribution of Pod-1 was determined by hybridization of a human multiple tissue northern blot with a Pod-1 cDNA. A probe lacking the bHLH domain was used to minimize cross-reactivity along with high stringency hybridization and washing. Results showed that in humans and mice, Pod-1 was most highly expressed in the kidney, lung and heart, with selective expression at sites of epithelial-mesenchymal interaction in the kidney, lung, intestine and pancreas of developing mouse embryos. RNA in situ hybridization using ^{33}P-labeled riboprobes was used to identify the cell types that expressed Pod-1 in the developing kidney and other tissues. This revealed Pod-1 expression in mesenchymal cells and podocytes, with expression coinciding with the onset of podocyte differentiation. It was found that expression of Pod-1 in embryonic kidney explants was inhibited through antisense oligonucleotides. This inhibition resulted in decreased mesenchymal cell condensation around the ureteric bud and a significant decrease in ureteric branching. Pod-1 was the first tissue-restricted bHLH protein to be identified in the developing kidney and tied to regulation of morphogenetic events.

In an effort to identify novel bHLH factors related to dHAND and eHAND (a novel subclass of cell type-restricted bHLH factors shown to play important roles in cardiac morphogenesis), they screened expressed sequence tag (EST) databases for sequences with homology to the bHLH regions of these factors. The novel bHLH protein they identified in their search was also Pod-1, but they used the name capsulin.

Whole-mount in situ hybridization of Capsulin transcripts were used to define sites of expression, which showed to be specific to mesodermal precursor cells that surround the epithelium of the developing gastrointestinal, genitourinary and respiratory systems during mouse embryogenesis. Expression patterns of capsulin mRNA in adult mouse tissues by Northern blot detected highest levels in the lungs, with lower levels in kidneys, heart and spleen. Capsulin transcripts were also found to mark the spiral septum of the heart and progenitor cells that give rise to the pericardium and coronary arteries.

Capsulin was translated in a rabbit reticulocyte lysate in the presence and absence of the widely expressed bHLH protein E12 and performed gel mobility shift assays with several E-box sequences as probes to test the protein's DNA binding activity. Capsulin alone failed to bind any of the sequences tested. However, in the presence of E12 plus capsulin, a DNA complex was generated with the probe that migrated faster than the E12 homodimeric complex alone, representing the binding of capsulin/E12 heterodimers. It was concluded that capsulin heterodimerizes with E12 and binds the specific E-box consensus sequence (CANNTG), though not activating transcription through this sequence on its own. Its restricted expression pattern and DNA binding activity identified Capsulin as a regulator of gene expression in specific subtypes of visceral mesodermal cells involved in organogenesis and in precursor cells that contribute to the pericardium, coronary arteries and regions of the heart.

== Structure ==
=== Gene ===
The TCF21 gene resides on chromosome 6 at the band 6q23.2 and includes 3 exons. These three exons are associated with CpG islands CGI1, CGI2, and CGI3. DNA methylation analysis revealed hypermethylation at CGI1 and CGI3, but not CGI2 in samples from various cancer tissues. Luciferase reporter assays with constructs covering CGI3 sequences in sense and antisense orientation demonstrated that CGI3 harbors a promoter that directs the synthesis of a previously unknown long non-coding RNAs (lncRNAs) in antisense orientation to TCF21. This lncRNA has been named TARID (for TCF21 antisense RNA inducing demethylation).

=== Protein ===
TCF21 is a member of the bHLH (basic helix-loop-helix) family of transcription factors. This protein is predicted to span 179 amino acid residues and contains a bHLH domain and an arginine-rich sequence that may facilitate DNA binding.

== Function ==
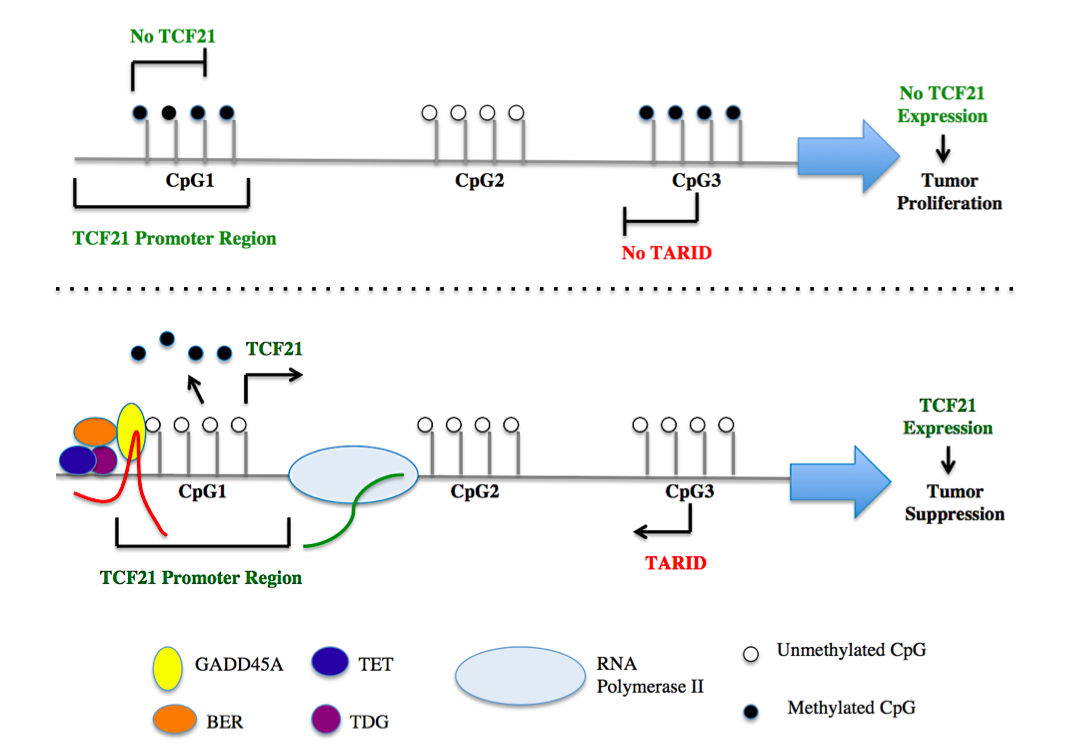
The third CGI of TCF21 contains a promoter that directs transcription of TARID (a lncRNA) in antisense orientation to TCF21. TARID then induces TET protein-dependent DNA demethylation, thus activating TCF21 transcription. This mechanism is regulated by the binding of TARID to the TCF21 promoter, which recruits GADD45A/TDG to direct BER for demethylation.

TCF21 encodes a transcription factor of the basic helix-loop-helix (bHLH) family, which manages cell-fate specification, commitment and differentiation in various cell lineages during development. The TCF21 product is mesoderm-specific and expressed in embryonic epicardium, mesenchyme-derived tissues of lung, gut, gonad, and both mesenchymal and glomerular epithelial cells in the kidney.

TCF21 is essential for regulating properties of the mesenchyme that are critically important for several aspects of lung and kidney morphogenesis. TCF21 is also essential for cardiac fibroblast cell fate, as demonstrated by the failed development of cardiac fibroblasts in mice lacking TCF21. In the absence of TCF21, these fibroblast progenitor cells do not undergo epithelial-to-mesenchymal transition (EMT). While TCF21-expressing epicardial cells are initially multipotent, they become committed to the fibroblast lineage over time. Those TCF21-expressing cells that do not commit to the fibroblast lineage lose this expression and remain undifferentiated epicardial cells or coronary vascular smooth muscle cells. TCF21 is expressed in mesodermal cells in the proepicardial organ that give rise to coronary artery smooth muscle cells (SMC) and loss of TCF21 results in increased expression of smooth muscle markers by cells on the heart surface consistent with premature SMC differentiation. This suggests that early expression of TCF21 is important for expansion of the SMC compartment of the coronary circulation, with persistent TCF21 expression being required for cardiac fibroblast development.

TCF21 activation is directed by an antisense long non-coding RNA, TARID (TCF21 antisense RNA inducing demethylation). TARID activates TCF21 expression by inducing promoter demethylation and affects expression levels of target genes by functioning as epigenetic regulators of chromatin structure through interactions with histone modifiers, chromatin remodeling complexes, transcriptional regulators, and/or DNA methylation machinery.

=== Role in development ===
Since the identification of Tcf21 significance in various cell lineages, further research has expanded understanding of the essential roles of this gene.

TCF21 is essential for regulating properties of the mesenchyme that are critically important for several aspects of lung and kidney morphogenesis. Null TCF21 mutant mice are born but die shortly after due to severely hypoplastic lungs and kidneys that lack alveoli and mature glomeruli. While TCF21 is exclusively expressed in the mesenchyme and podocytes, major defects are observed in adjacent epithelia of TCF21 mutant mice. In the kidney, TCF21 is required for conversion of condensing mesenchyme to epithelium of the nephron, branching morphogenesis and terminal differentiation of tubular epithelium. In the lung, TCF21 is required to correctly pattern the proximodistal axis of airway epithelium and for normal branching to occur.

TCF21 null mice also fail to form a spleen, as TCF21 acts after splenic specification to control morphogenetic expansion of the splenic anlage and in its absence, splenic precursor cells undergo apoptosis. Since this splenic phenotype resembles that of mice lacking the homeobox genes Hox11 and Bapx1, it is possible that TCF21, together with Hox11, and Bapx1 control a common essential early step in the developmental pathway for spleen organogenesis.

TCF21 is essential for cardiac fibroblast cell fate, as demonstrated by the failed development of cardiac fibroblasts in mice lacking TCF21. In the absence of TCF21, these fibroblast progenitor cells do not undergo epithelial-to-mesenchymal transition (EMT). While TCF21-expressing epicardial cells are initially multipotent, they become committed to the fibroblast lineage over time. Those TCF21-expressing cells that do not commit to the fibroblast lineage lose this expression and remain undifferentiated epicardial cells or coronary vascular smooth muscle cells. TCF21 is expressed in mesodermal cells in the proepicardial organ that give rise to coronary artery smooth muscle cells (SMC) and loss of TCF21 results in increased expression of smooth muscle markers by cells on the heart surface consistent with premature SMC differentiation. This suggests that early expression of TCF21 is important for expansion of the SMC compartment of the coronary circulation, with persistent TCF21 expression being required for cardiac fibroblast development.

Male TCF21 knockout mice, which die at birth due to respiratory failure, are reported to have feminized genitalia, implicating TCF21 in mouse gonadal development/differentiation. TCF21 transcriptionally represses steroidogenic factor 1 (Sf1), a gene expression regulator that mediates sexual differentiation and is involved in coordinating cell fate decisions in gonadal progenitors. Without TCF21, normal gonad development is disrupted as a result of ectopic expression of Sf1, which leads to abnormal committing of urogenital progenitor cells to steroidogenic cell fates. In the XY gonad, this disruption in organization contributes to changes in testicular structure and vasculature.

== Clinical significance ==
=== As a cancer suppressor ===
In humans, TCF21 has been identified as a candidate tumor suppressor gene and is frequently epigenetically silenced in various human cancers.

Restriction landmark genomic scanning (RLGS) along a region of recurrent loss of heterozygosity (LOH) at chromosome 6q23-q24 to profile DNA methylation was used to test the hypothesis that abnormal promoter methylation could help pinpoint the location of a candidate tumor suppressor in regions of LOH. 6q23-q24 was the chosen chromosomal region due to frequently described LOH in human head and neck squamous cell carcinomas (HNSCC) and non-small-cell lung cancers (NSCLC) as well as in other tumor types, but with no identified tumor suppressor. Hypermethylation was found to occur frequently in the same RLGS loci in HNSCC and NSCLC. Sodium bisulfite sequencing further identified tumor-specific methylation of TCF21 when compared to normal controls. RNA samples were isolated from tumor tissues and analyzed to correlate the amount of TCF21 mRNA and DNA methylation in the samples. Overall, tumor samples with higher levels of CpG island hypermethylation had decreased TCF21 expression than normal controls. Exogenous expression of TCF21 in cells with silenced endogenous TCF21 loci resulted in a reductions in tumor properties both in vitro and in vivo. Based on these results, it was concluded that TCF21 is a tumor suppressor gene, often silenced by hypermethylation in cancer.

TCF21 has also been linked to metastatic melanoma progression through the inhibition of the KISS1 metastasis-suppressor gene. DNA methylation analysis in melanoma patient biopsies has demonstrated downregulation of TCF21 due to promoter hypermethylation, which also correlates with decreased survival in patients suffering from metastatic skin melanoma. TCF21, together with E12 and TCF12, bind the KISS1 promoter, sustaining its activity. Without TCF21 to interact with the KISS1 promoter, KISS1 expression is lost. Melanoma cells overexpressing TCF21 have also been found to display reduced motility compared with vector-only control cells.

Tobacco-induced lung cancer research has found TCF21 to be among the genes identified as highly methylated at both high and low concentrations of cigarette smoke condensate (CSC). In the presence genistein, one of the soy-derived bioactive isoflavones, methylation of TCF21 is significantly reduced. Genistein has been known to affect tumorigenesis through epigenetic regulation, such as chromatin configuration and DNA methylation, activating other tumor suppressor genes that affect cancer cell survival. These findings support the hypothesis that increasing hypermethylated tumor suppressor genes such as TCF21 is a potential chemopreventative pathway in tobacco-induced lung cancer.

TCF21 may have also therapeutic potential for breast cancer treatment, as downregulation of TCF21 has been implicated in breast cancer tumorigenesis and proliferation. TCF21 mRNA expression is very low in breast cancer cells compared with normal breast epithelial cells. This low expression is also associated with large tumor size and lymph node metastasis. Breast cancer tissues exhibit significantly downregulated expression of TCF21 mRNA and TCF21 mRNA overexpression has been found to inhibit cancerous cell proliferation.

=== Clinical marker ===
TCF21 methylation has been considered as a potential clinical marker in the diagnosis of renal cell carcinoma. Accordingly, TCF21 methylation levels in urine samples may be a useful means of diagnosing renal cell carcinoma. Also TCF21 rs12190287 polymorphism can regulate TCF21 expression and may serve as a potential marker for genetic susceptibility to breast cancer.

Additionally, a multi-locus genetic risk score study based on a combination of 27 loci, including the TCF21 gene, identified individuals at increased risk for both incident and recurrent coronary artery disease events, as well as an enhanced clinical benefit from statin therapy. The study was based on a community cohort study (the Malmo Diet and Cancer study) and four additional randomized controlled trials of primary prevention cohorts (JUPITER and ASCOT) and secondary prevention cohorts (CARE and PROVE IT-TIMI 22).
