= LOC100287387 =

RNA gene in humans

Identifiers
- Aliases: uncharacterized LOC100287387
- External IDs: GeneCards:
Orthologs
Databases	NCBI: entry
Species	Human	Mouse
Entrez	100287387	n/a
Ensembl	n/a	n/a
UniProt	n a	n/a
RefSeq (mRNA)	XM_003960314; XM_002342310	n/a
RefSeq (protein)	n/a	n/a
Location (UCSC)	n/a	n/a
PubMed search		n/a
- Wikidata
View/Edit Human

Uncharacterized LOC100287387 is a putative non-coding RNA that in humans is encoded by the gene LOC100287387. The function of this RNA is not yet understood in the scientific community. The gene is located on the q arm of chromosome 2.

== Gene ==
Chromosome 2 of the Human Genome

The human LOC100287387 gene is located on the minus strand of the q arm of chromosome 2 at 2q37.3. It overlaps the TWIST2 gene family on the plus strand of chromosome 2. The gene is formed by three exons, with two introns near the start codon.

== Expression ==
In humans, there is low expression of LOC100287387 in all tissues. Highest expression is in the skin and central nervous system tissue such as the pons, superior cervical ganglion, trigeminal ganglion, and globus pallidus. However, expression was inconsistent among patients.

== Regulation ==
The promoter region of the LOC100287387 gene contains binding sites for many transcription factors which affect transcription levels of the gene. Within the promoter region, there are three TFIIB binding sites (initiates transcription), a cysteine-serine-rich nuclear protein 1 site (an activator), a Kruppel-like zinc finger protein 219 site (repressor), a stimulating protein 1 site (activator), and many more.

== Homology ==
Orthologs to the human LOC100287387 gene are found only in mammals, and the protein sequence is not highly conserved. Conservation is highest in primates, and falls drastically among other mammals. Conservation between species is highest at the nuclear localization signal and towards the end of the coding sequence at the G Patch domain and DUF308 which indicates these are the most functionally important parts of the sequence.

Orthologs of Human LOC100287387
Genus and species	Common name	Divergence from Homo sapiens (Million Years)	Polypeptide Length	Sequence Identity (%)
Homo sapiens	Human	0	423	100
Pan Paniscus	Bonobo	6.4	325	93
Nomascus leucogenys	Gibbon	19.4	307	90
Oryctalagus cuniculus	European Rabbit	88	241	57
Tursiops truncatus	Bottlenose Dolphin	94	300	64
Orcinus orca	Killer Whale	94	300	64
Delphinapterus leucas	Beluga Whale	94	338	57
Mustela putorious furo	Ferret	94	303	57
Canis lupus	Dog	94	184 & 63 (No continuous reading frame)	38

There are no paralogs of the human gene LOC100287387.

== Function ==
The protein contains a nuclear localization signal, and most likely acts in the nucleus. There are no confirmed protein interactions or associations to diseases.
