= TCF12 =

Protein-coding gene in the species Homo sapiens

Identifiers
- Aliases: TCF12, CRS3, HEB, HTF4, HsT17266, bHLHb20, TCF-12, transcription factor 12, p64, HH26
- External IDs: OMIM: 600480; MGI: 101877; GeneCards: TCF12
Available structures
PDB	Ortholog search: PDBe RCSB
PDB	List of PDB id codes 2KNH, 4JOL

Gene location (Human)
Chr.	Chromosome 15 (human)
Band	15q21.3	Start	56,918,623 bp
Band	15q21.3	End	57,299,281 bp

Gene location (Mouse)
Chr.	Chromosome 9 (mouse)
Band	9 D|9 39.85 cM	Start	71,749,970 bp
Band	9 D|9 39.85 cM	End	72,019,153 bp
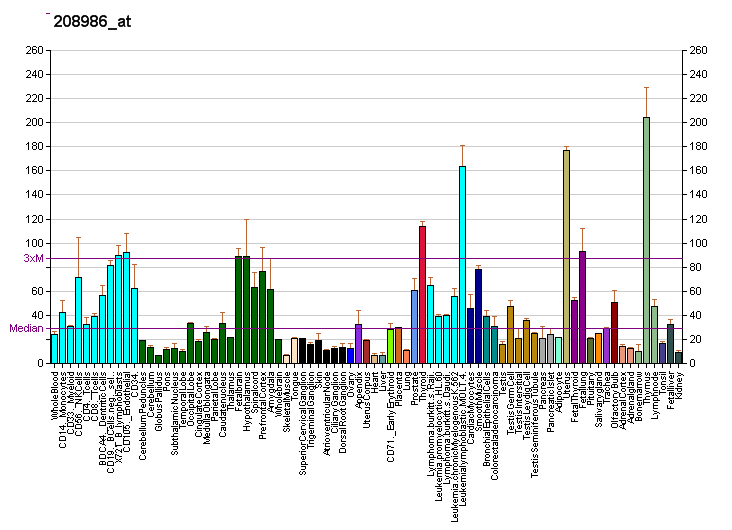
RNA expression pattern
Bgee	Human / Mouse (ortholog); Top expressed in: periodontal fiber; ventricular zone; ganglionic eminence; hair follicle; epithelium of colon; Achilles tendon; stromal cell of endometrium; corpus callosum; optic nerve; mucosa of paranasal sinus / Top expressed in: genital tubercle; medial ganglionic eminence; dermis; abdominal wall; tail of embryo; maxillary prominence; mandibular prominence; human fetus; conjunctival fornix; medullary collecting duct; More reference expression data
BioGPS	More reference expression data
Gene ontology
Molecular function	DNA binding; protein dimerization activity; protein homodimerization activity; DNA-binding transcription factor activity; HMG box domain binding; DNA-binding transcription activator activity, RNA polymerase II-specific; transcription factor binding; RNA polymerase II cis-regulatory region sequence-specific DNA binding; bHLH transcription factor binding; E-box binding; protein binding; protein heterodimerization activity; SMAD binding; cAMP response element binding; DNA-binding transcription factor activity, RNA polymerase II-specific
Cellular component	cytoplasm; transcription regulator complex; RNA polymerase II transcription regulator complex; nucleus; nuclear speck; intracellular membrane-bounded organelle; nucleoplasm
Biological process	cell differentiation; regulation of transcription, DNA-templated; regulation of transcription by RNA polymerase II; muscle organ development; transcription, DNA-templated; nervous system development; multicellular organism development; positive regulation of transcription, DNA-templated; positive regulation of gene expression; positive regulation of neuron differentiation; immune response; positive regulation of transcription by RNA polymerase II; transcription by RNA polymerase II; regulation of hematopoietic stem cell differentiation
Sources:Amigo / QuickGO
Orthologs
Databases	NCBI: entry; OMA: entry
Species	Human	Mouse
Entrez	6938	21406
Ensembl	ENSG00000140262	ENSMUSG00000032228
UniProt	Q99081	Q61286
RefSeq (mRNA)	NM_001306219; NM_001306220; NM_003205; NM_207036; NM_207037 NM_207038; NM_207040; NM_001322151; NM_001322152; NM_001322154; NM_001322156; NM_001322157; NM_001322158; NM_001322159; NM_001322161; NM_001322162; NM_001322164; NM_001322165	NM_001253862; NM_001253863; NM_001253864; NM_001253865; NM_011544
RefSeq (protein)	NP_001293148; NP_001293149; NP_001309080; NP_001309081; NP_001309083 NP_001309085; NP_001309086; NP_001309087; NP_001309088; NP_001309090; NP_001309091; NP_001309093; NP_001309094; NP_003196; NP_996919; NP_996920; NP_996921; NP_996923	NP_001240791; NP_001240792; NP_001240793; NP_001240794; NP_035674
Location (UCSC)	Chr 15: 56.92 – 57.3 Mb	Chr 9: 71.75 – 72.02 Mb
PubMed search
- Wikidata
View/Edit Human	View/Edit Mouse

Transcription factor 12 is a protein that in humans is encoded by the TCF12 gene.

The protein encoded by this gene is a member of the basic helix-loop-helix (bHLH) E-protein family that recognizes the consensus binding site (E-box) CANNTG. This encoded protein is expressed in many tissues, among them skeletal muscle, thymus, B- and T-cells, and may participate in regulating lineage-specific gene expression through the formation of heterodimers with other bHLH E-proteins. Several alternatively spliced transcript variants of this gene have been described, but the full-length nature of some of these variants has not been determined. TCF12 has been speculatively related to human male sexuality through a GWAS study indicating association to a related single nucleotide polymorphism. Mutations in this gene have also been associated with cases of coronal craniosynostosis.

TCF12 is the primary heterodimerising partner of TCF21, a tumour suppressor gene and a target of SRY/SOX9 activity.
