= John Hand =

John Hand may refer to:

- John Hand (priest) (1807–1846), Irish priest who founded All Hallows College, Dublin
- John Hand (rower) (born 1902), Canadian Olympic rower
- John P. Hand (1850–1923), American jurist

== See also ==
- Jon Hand (born 1963), American football player
