= Handmaiden (disambiguation) =

A handmaiden is a historic type of personal servant.

Handmaiden, or similar, may also refer to:

== Biology ==
- Handmaid or Dysauxes ancilla, a moth in the family Erebidae
- Handmaiden moth, or Syntomoides imaon, a moth in the family Erebidae

== Media ==
- The Handmaiden, (아가씨; Agassi) a 2016 Korean film based on Sarah Waters' Fingersmith
- Handmaid Media, Australian film production company headed by Samantha Lang

== See also ==
- Hand (disambiguation)
- Handmaids of Charity, an Italian religious institution
- The Handmaid's Tale (1985), a novel by Margaret Atwood
  - The Handmaid's Tale (film)
  - The Handmaid's Tale (opera)
  - The Handmaid's Tale (TV series)
- Maid (disambiguation)
- Maiden (disambiguation)
