= Prepubertal hypertrichosis =

- Specialty: Dermatology
- Symptoms: Excessive hair growth all over the body in children
- Differential diagnosis: Hirsutism

Prepubertal hypertrichosis, also known as childhood hypertrichosis, is a cutaneous condition characterized by increased hair growth, found in otherwise healthy infants and children. Prepubertal hypertrichosis is a cosmetic condition and does not affect any other health aspect. Individuals with this condition may suffer with low self esteem and mental health issues due to societal perceptions of what a "normal" appearance should be. The mechanism of prepubertal hypertrichosis is unclear, but causes may include genetics, systemic illnesses, or medications.

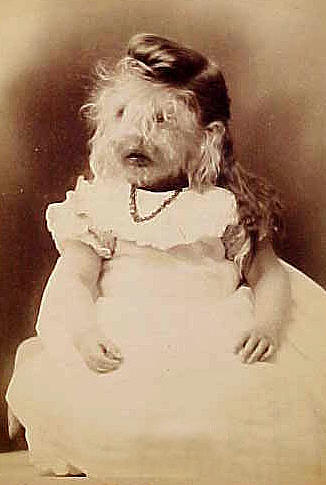
A child that has prepubertal hypertrichosis

While hypertrichosis affects men and women equally, hypertrichosis of the ears, hypertrichosis of the nose, and hereditary hypertrichosis primarily affect males. Prepubertal hypertrichosis can be present at birth or develop later on during childhood.

Management strategies for prepubertal hypertrichosis include pharmacological therapy, drug discontinuation if caused by a drug, and chemical or physical hair removal or alteration methods.

== Signs and symptoms ==
Prepubertal hypertrichosis is characterized by an excess of hair growth, seen during birth and progressing during childhood. In generalized hypertrichosis, excessive hair growth occurs all over the body, whereas in localized hypertrichosis, excessive hair growth only occurs in certain areas of the body. One example of localized, or circumscribed, prepubertal hypertrichosis is lumbosacral hypertrichosis, or faun tail nevus. The pattern of hair growth in generalized prepubertal hypertrichosis predominates the face, back, and limbs. Importantly, this is unique from excessive hair growth patterns in hirsutism.

Hypertrichosis itself is benign, but presents a cosmetic issue that may lead to psychosocial problems. As the child grows up, the hair growth may resume, increase, or decrease. However, overall growth patterns and progression may vary based on the classification of hypertrichosis, as well as its association with other disorders.

== Causes ==
The precise causes and mechanism of prepubertal hypertrichosis is subject to more intense research, yet it is known that it typically does not result from increased androgen levels, which is a significant characteristic of hirsutism. It is termed "prepubertal" because it occurs before the typical age or onset of puberty and is thus not due to normal hormonal changes that typically occur during puberty. Even though the onset can occur at birth or in childhood, the excessive hair growth can continue onwards into adulthood. Prepubertal hypertrichosis on its own is a relatively rare condition.

Reports of prepubertal hypertrichosis can be attributed to a variety of factors such as it being an adverse effect of various medications, or even having an infection, genetic disorder, metabolic disorder, or eating disorders (particularly anorexia nervosa). Since hypertrichosis can be present at birth or occur during childhood, it is suggested for an expecting parent to discuss the medications that they are taking or planning to take with their physician first since possible side effects may arise among themself or for their developing baby. It is also important for them to refrain from consuming alcohol during pregnancy as it can put the baby at risk for adverse effects such as increasing the risk for prepubertal hypertrichosis. Therefore, adverse effects to the baby can occur due to a medication or alcohol intake, which could lead to the possible development of hypertrichosis. Prepubertal hypertrichosis does not necessarily correlate with a serious underlying condition, as it can be seen in children who do not present with any conditions. However, there is still a possibility that other underlying conditions can be associated in cases where prepubertal hypertrichosis is identified. For instance, leprechaunism has the possibility to be present with hypertrichosis in those born with less fat, though a proper diagnosis would need to be done.

=== Pathophysiology ===
There is limited research available to fully understand the pathophysiology of prepubertal hypertrichosis and mechanism of hair growth in this condition, but a potential pathway in some is attributed to increased concentrations of testosterone in the body. The elevated testosterone levels can lead to excessive hair growth all over the body during childhood, with the most affected areas being the face, back, and areas closer to the trunk of the body. Although the mechanism is not yet clear, some medications can cause hypertrichosis. Minoxidil and cyclosporine are some examples of medications that can cause hypertrichosis.

=== Potential mechanisms ===
There is no clear identifiable cause for most cases of prepubertal hypertrichosis. Prepubertal hypertrichosis may be due to genetics, systemic illnesses, or medications.

==== Genetics ====
Listed below are some genetic syndromes that are currently known to cause hypertrichosis:

- Zimmermann–Laband syndrome
- Coffin–Siris syndrome
- Schnizel–Giedion midface retraction syndrome
- Gorlin–Chaudry Moss syndrome
- Adducted thumbs syndrome
- Barber–Say syndrome

==== Systemic illnesses ====
Listed below are some systemic illnesses that are currently known to cause hypertrichosis:

- Thyroid hormone level abnormality
- Malnutrition
- Cancer

==== Medications ====
Listed below are some medications that are currently known to cause hypertrichosis:

- Minoxidil
- Cyclosporine
- Diazoxide
- Danazol
- Phenothiazine
- Hydantoin
- Omeprazole - possibly via modulation of prostaglandin pathways responsible for hair growth and regulation.

In addition, there are two prominent mechanisms that are currently being used to explain the development of hypertrichosis in individuals.

==== Conversion of hair types ====
The first proposed mechanism states that the excessive hair growth is due to the conversion of vellus hair (peach fuzz) to terminal hair (thick and dark). This can be compared to terminal hair replacing vellus hair which occurs during puberty due to an increase in androgen production. However the vellus to terminal hair conversion in hypertrichosis has yet to be fully understood.

==== Changes in the hair growth cycle ====
The second proposed mechanism involves the hair follicle growth cycle. Human hair follicles follow a growth cycle that has three stages: anagen, catagen, and telogen. Active growth of the hair follicle occurs during the anagen phase. During the catagen phase, the hair follicle undergoes a process to prepare for hair shedding. The telogen phase is when hair shedding occurs. The hair follicle growth cycle varies by person and by body location of hair growth. Hypertrichosis is said to occur when hair follicles are in the anagen phase longer than normal for their particular hair location.

Despite the known mechanisms, there is currently little understanding as to what triggers them.

== Diagnosis ==
In order to give the correct diagnosis of hypertrichosis, health care providers must determine if the excess hair growth is truly due to hypertrichosis or if it is due to different conditions such as hirsutism. While both conditions cause excessive hair growth, hirsutism and hypertrichosis differ based on location of hair growth and the dependence of the endocrine hormone androgen. Hirsutism is defined as excessive hair growth that is limited to androgen dependent areas. Examples of androgen dependent areas include the chin, upper lip, chest, abdomen, back, and anterior thighs. On the other hand, hypertrichosis is defined as excessive hair growth anywhere on the body and is independent of androgen.

In addition, hypertrichosis is a condition that affects both males and females while hirsutism is primarily used to describe "male-like pattern terminal hair growth in women within androgen-dependent sites".

=== Evaluation ===
Listed below are aspects that physicians take into consideration when determining the classification of hypertrichosis:

- Which hair type is predominant
- Familial history of hypertrichosis
- Any evidence of a genetic syndrome that would cause hypertrichosis
- Current medication usage
- Thyroid hormone levels
- Nutritional status
- Cancer

== Classification ==
Hypertrichosis diagnosis can be further specified by different classifications. These classifications can be distinguished from one another based on "type of hair, age of onset, distribution of hair, and location of hair growth."

=== Hair type ===
- Lanugo hair: "fine, non-pigmented hair that covers the normal fetus. It is often several centimeters long. By the first few weeks of life, lanugo hair should be replaced by velds hair on the body and terminal hair on the scalp."
- Vellus hair: "Lightly pigmented, fine, short hair, often referred to as "peach fuzz" that is found on the face, arms, stomach, and legs."
- Terminal hair: "Coarse, thick hair that is found on the scalp, underarms, and pubic area."

=== Age of onset ===
- Congenital: Present at the time of birth
- Acquired: Not present at the time of birth but develops sometime after birth

=== Distribution ===
- Generalized: Not limited to a certain area
- Localized: Primarily affecting a certain area

Prepubertal hypertrichosis can be associated with other syndromes or diagnosed in isolation. Isolated congenital generalized hypertrichosis includes monogenic disorders: hypertrichosis lanuginosa congenita and hypertrichosis congenita terminalis. Syndromic congenital generalized hypertrichosis includes monogenic and chromosomal disorders. The monogenic disorders may be further distinguished by autosomal dominant, autosomal recessive, and X-linked disorders.

=== Generalized prepubertal hypertrichosis ===
Isolated congenital hypertrichosis
Hypertrichosis lanuginosa congenita: lanugo hair growth all over the body, excluding the palms, soles, and mucous membranes, growing up to 3–5 cm.
Hypertrichosis congenita terminalis: terminal hair growth all over the body, excluding the palms, soles, and mucous membranes. It is often associated with gingival hyperplasia.
Syndrome-associated congenital hypertrichosis
Monogenic		Chromosomal
Autosomal dominant	Ambras syndrome (hypertrichosis universalis congenita): vellus hair growth all over the body, excluding the palms, soles, and mucous membranes.; Barbar–Say syndrome; Cantú syndrome; Coffin–Siris syndrome	Partial trisomy 3q
Autosomal recessive	Leprechaunism; Berardinelli–Seip syndrome; Congenital erythropoietic porphyria (Gunther disease)	Partial trisomy 3q
X-linked	Cornelia de Lange syndrome; Mucopolysaccharidoses type II	Partial trisomy 3q

=== Localized prepubertal hypertrichosis ===
Congenital	Acquired (potential sources)
Congenital melanocytic Nevus; Becker’s Nevus; Nevoid hypertrichosis	Secondary to herpes zoster; Contact dermatitis; Gonococcal arthritis; Drugs; Chronic osteomyelitis; Peripheral neuropathy; Burns, insect bite; Wart

==== Vaccination ====
In 2020, a case study reported that a Caucasian child developed two patches of hypertrichosis at the sites of vaccine injection for Diphtheria-Tetanus-acellular Pertussis-poliovirus (DTPa-IPV) and chicken pox. After the vaccines were given, the child had developed erythema, swelling, and itch at the two sites, and the hypertrichosis was reported 6 months later.

==== Cast application ====
Several case studies have reported hypertrichosis in children after the application of casts. One study done in 2012 identified a significant number of cases of hypertrichosis in a group of 117 patients, ages ranging from 3 to 91 years old after application of casts.

== Psychological impact ==
People with prepubertal hypertrichosis can experience widespread hair growth all throughout the body that can become prominent during childhood. The impact that prepubertal hypertrichosis can have on the individual as well as their family can be difficult, although there are a variety of possible treatment options for these individuals in regards to removing hair. In addition to cosmetic treatments, it is also important to consider psychological care as individuals with the condition may be struggling with their mental health due to their appearance.

== Management and treatment ==
=== Management ===
The degree and type of management depends on the age of the child, the severity and location of the hypertrichosis, and the psychosocial needs of the child, their family, and society. The management strategies for controlling and removing the excessive hair growth include physical management strategies such as shaving, trimming, waxing, and tweezing, chemical strategies such as bleaching or use of chemical depilatories, the use of light sources in laser hair removal, intense pulse light therapy, and electrolysis. More specifically, depilation temporarily removes hairs from the surface while epilation removes hairs from their bulb. The management options vary in effectiveness, cost, and adverse effects such as pain, skin irritation, and distorted hair regrowth.

==== Depilation ====
Depilation methods include shaving and chemical depilatories. Shaving does not affect the growth rate or diameter of the individual hairs. However, it can appear thicker and more coarse than before due to the hair having a blunt tip after shaving. While inexpensive, shaving can cause irritation, folliculitis, and ingrown hairs. Chemical depilatories use sulfides, thioglycolates, or enzymatic depilatory agents which dissolve hairs by breaking the disulfide bonds in keratin which normally keep hair strong and healthy. Chemical depilatories are painless and easy to use, coming in many forms such as powders, creams, and lotions. Sulfides are effective and work fast but can also produce hydrogen sulfide which has an unpleasant odor and can cause irritant contact dermatitis. Enzymatic depilatory agents do not produce an unpleasant odor and are nonirritating, but they also have not been found to be effective. Therefore, most chemical depilatories use thioglycolates. which work slower in comparison to sulfides but are less odiferous and irritating.

==== Epilation ====
Epilation methods include waxing, tweezing/plucking, laser hair removal, intense pulse light therapy, and electrolysis. Waxing is commonly used in larger areas and temporarily removes hair for about 2 to 6 weeks. Waxing can cause skin irritation, scars, folliculitis, and thermal injury due to the hot wax, and repeated waxing can reduce hair regrowth over time. Tweezing or plucking hair is best for smaller areas and can remove hair for 2 to 12 weeks. Tweezing is inexpensive and causes minimal skin damage, but it also takes the most time and can cause pain in sensitive areas.

Laser hair removal uses red to near-infrared light (600-1100 nm) to remove hair. The light is absorbed by melanin in the hair which heats and damages the hair follicles to remove it. Laser hair removal has found to delay hair regrowth by up to 3 months. Laser hair removal can cause redness, edema, first to second degree burns, skin damage, and pigmentation. Those with darker skin types are at greater risk for dyspigmentation and scarring, because they have higher melanin content.

Intense pulse light therapy (IPL) uses polychromatic light to cause permanent hair removal. The melanin found in hair absorbs these long wavelengths of light (590-900 nm) which are converted into heat to cause the destruction of the hair bulb to permanently remove the hair. The choice of wavelength depends on a person's skin type and skin condition. IPL is ideal for larger areas and can cause pain, edema, erythema, and pigmentation. While this option is less expensive than laser hair removal, it is also less effective and therefore, requires more treatment sessions.

There are three different types of electrolysis: galvanic, thermolysis, and blend. Galvanic electrolysis uses a needle to directly deliver the electrical current to the hair follicle. The current has a corrosive effect, destroying the hair via production of sodium hydroxide. While galvanic electrolysis is the more effective than thermolysis, it also is slower. Thermolysis uses a high-frequency alternating current which produces heat to destroy the hair bulb. Thermolysis is less effective in thicker hairs and those with curved follicles. Blend electrolysis combines both galvanic and thermolysis and is the most effective version of electrolysis. Electrolysis in general can cause pain, hyperpigmentation, and scarring, but galvanic electrolysis has the most severe of the side effects.

==== Other management strategies ====
Bleaching is an alternative management strategy. While bleaching does not remove hair or prevent is growth, it can lighten the appearance of hairs by removing the hair's natural pigment. The hydrogen peroxide in bleach helps to soften and oxidize the hairs to turn it into a yellowish hue. Bleaching is quick, easy, and painless, only causing some skin irritation. Additionally, the effects of bleaching can last up to 4 weeks.

=== Treatment ===
==== Pharmacological therapy ====
Eflornithine hydrochloride 13.9% cream (Vaniqa®) is a topical prescription medication that has been approved by the FDA as a treatment to reduce hair growth. Eflornithine irreversible inhibits ornithine decarboxylase which is an important enzyme involved in hair growth. Elfornithine does not remove hair through epilation or depilation but rather slows hair growths. Some side effects of eflornithine cream include acne, folliculitis, stinging or burning, skin irritation, redness, itching, and dizziness. Eflornithine cream is not meant to be used alone and is recommended to be combined with another hair removal technique. The FDA only approved elfornithine cream for use on the face and other adjacent areas under the chin, and not the entire body.

==== Drug discontinuation ====
If the cause of hypertrichosis was due to a particular medication, the discontinuation of said medication usually reverses the effects of excessive hair growth.

== See also ==
- Hypertrichosis
- List of cutaneous conditions
