= Cambridge, Illinois =

Cambridge
- Village
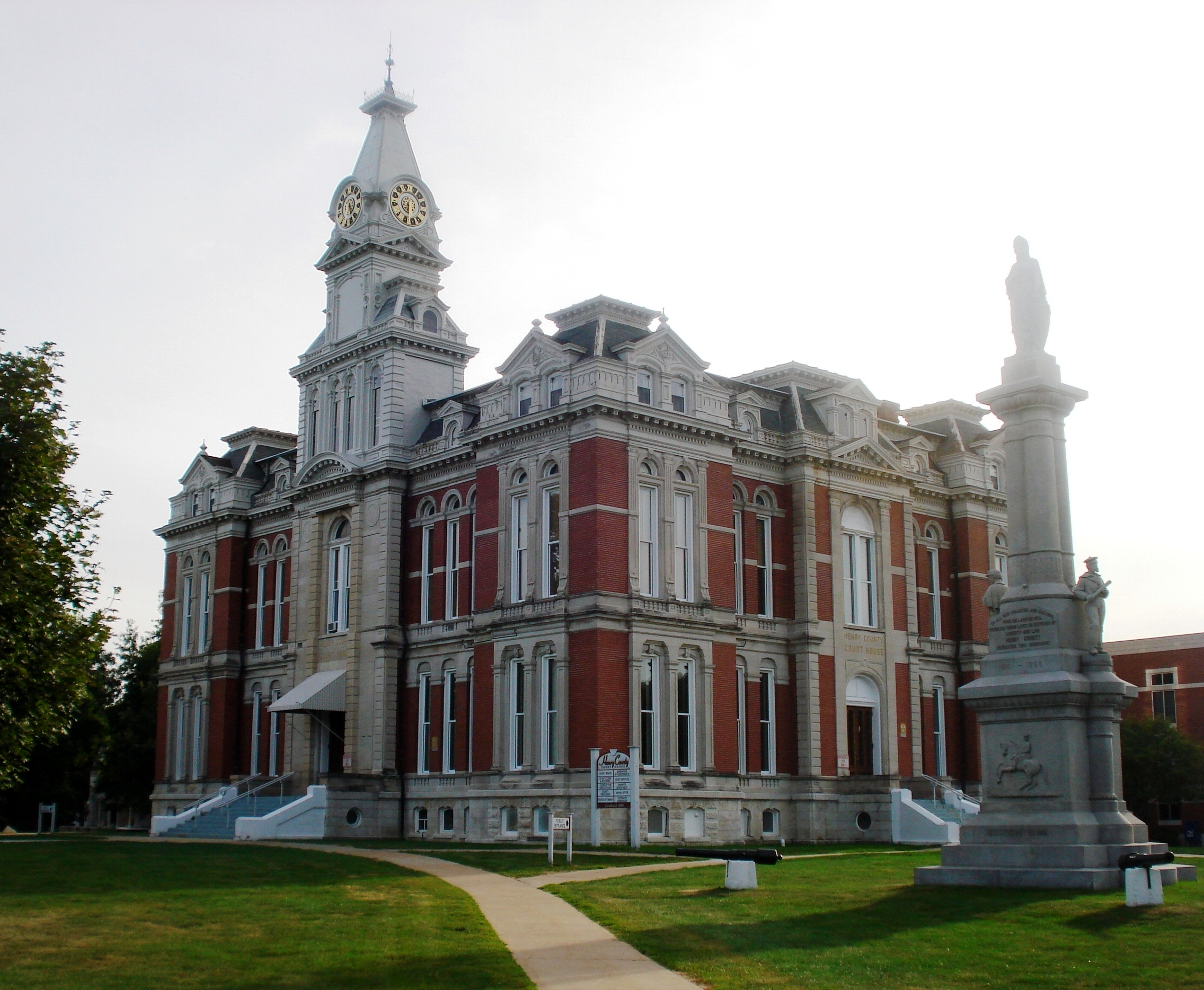
- Henry County Courthouse
- Interactive map of Cambridge
- Location within Illinois Location within the United States
- Coordinates: 41°17′54″N 90°11′27″W
- Country: United States
- State: Illinois
- County: Henry
- Township: Cambridge

Government
  - Type: Village Board

Area
  - Total: 2.00 sq mi (5.19 km^{2})
  - Land: 1.99 sq mi (5.16 km^{2})
  - Water: 0.015 sq mi (0.04 km^{2})
- Elevation: 801 ft (244 m)

Population (2020)
  - Total: 2,086
  - Density: 1,047.5/sq mi (404.43/km^{2})
- Time zone: UTC-6 (CST)
  - Summer (DST): UTC-5 (CDT)
- ZIP Code: 61238
- Area code: 309
- FIPS code: 17-10643
- GNIS feature ID: 2397538
- Website: www.cambridgeil.org

Cambridge is a village in and the county seat of Henry County, Illinois, United States. The population was 2,086 at the 2020 census.

== History ==
After European-American settlement in this area and before 1843, Rev. Ithamar Pillsbury owned a large plot of land that was later developed as the town of Cambridge. He was well known among the numerous Yankee settlers (migrants from New England and upstate New York, who were largely descended from the English colonists in New England) who were migrating to Henry County at that time. Reverend Pillsbury deeded a large portion of his land to the town council for use as a town plot. Lots were sold to incoming migrants and on June 9, 1843 (after some quarreling among the town founders about how to finance it) construction began on the town.

They laid out roads, established post routes, and erected public buildings to attract new residents. The original settlers were almost entirely of New England origins or were Yankees from upstate New York, whose families had moved to that area in the period after the Revolutionary War. They were land hungry.

As a result, Henry County was part of the Northern Tier, with its culture being closely aligned with that of upstate New York and early New England.

=== Links to Bishop Hill ===
Historically, Cambridge has been linked to nearby Bishop Hill, Illinois. This latter community was founded in 1846 by a sect of Swedish immigrants led by their prophet, Erik Janson. They had broken with the established Lutheran Church of Sweden, which did not tolerate much dissent. But for several years, local Americans and their Swedish neighbors traded and lived in peace.

In 1850, Erik Janson was murdered by a former follower in the court house in Cambridge. The historic record reveals some tension between the Swedes in Bishop Hill and the residents of Cambridge. Also, the concentration of Swedish immigrants here attracted more of their countrymen to the Henry County area. As the population grew, they sought religious leadership from the established Lutheran Church of Sweden, then an official branch of the Swedish government.

Before fleeing from Sweden, Erik Janson and his followers had a contentious break from the Lutheran Church. The Cambridge Lutheran church was established as an offshoot of Lars Paul Esbjörn's Augustana Lutheran Church in nearby Andover, Illinois, and was in line with the established church. But religious-related tensions continued between the Augustana Lutherans (including Augustana College in Rock Island, Illinois) and the people of Bishop Hill well into the late 20th century. (For more information on Cambridge's relationship with Bishop Hill see Troy Swanson's "Those Crazy Swedes: Outside Influence on the Bishop Hill Colony" in Nobler things to View: Collected Essays on the Erik-Janssonists, published by the Bishop Hill Heritage Association in 1998.)

== Geography ==
According to the 2021 census gazetteer files, Cambridge has a total area of 2.01 square miles (5.21 km^{2}), of which 1.99 square miles (5.15 km^{2}) (or 99.30%) is land and 0.01 square miles (0.03 km^{2}) (or 0.70%) is water.

== Demographics ==
Historical population
| Census | Pop. | Note | %± |
|---|---|---|---|
| 1880 | 1,203 | | — |
| 1890 | 940 | | −21.9% |
| 1900 | 1,345 | | 43.1% |
| 1910 | 1,272 | | −5.4% |
| 1920 | 1,335 | | 5.0% |
| 1930 | 1,355 | | 1.5% |
| 1940 | 1,312 | | −3.2% |
| 1950 | 1,489 | | 13.5% |
| 1960 | 1,665 | | 11.8% |
| 1970 | 2,095 | | 25.8% |
| 1980 | 2,217 | | 5.8% |
| 1990 | 2,124 | | −4.2% |
| 2000 | 2,180 | | 2.6% |
| 2010 | 2,160 | | −0.9% |
| 2020 | 2,086 | | −3.4% |
U.S. Decennial Census

=== 2020 census ===
As of the 2020 census, Cambridge had a population of 2,086. The population density was 1,040.40 inhabitants per square mile (401.70/km^{2}). There were 910 housing units at an average density of 453.87 per square mile (175.24/km^{2}).

The median age was 41.2 years. 22.9% of residents were under the age of 18 and 18.4% of residents were 65 years of age or older. For every 100 females there were 99.8 males, and for every 100 females age 18 and over there were 103.0 males age 18 and over.

0.0% of residents lived in urban areas, while 100.0% lived in rural areas.

There were 828 households in Cambridge, of which 28.0% had children under the age of 18 living in them. Of all households, 53.4% were married-couple households, 16.5% were households with a male householder and no spouse or partner present, and 23.4% were households with a female householder and no spouse or partner present. About 29.2% of all households were made up of individuals and 12.4% had someone living alone who was 65 years of age or older.

There were 910 housing units, of which 9.0% were vacant. The homeowner vacancy rate was 2.0% and the rental vacancy rate was 7.1%.

Racial composition as of the 2020 census
| Race | Number | Percent |
|---|---|---|
| White | 1,950 | 93.5% |
| Black or African American | 13 | 0.6% |
| American Indian and Alaska Native | 4 | 0.2% |
| Asian | 6 | 0.3% |
| Native Hawaiian and Other Pacific Islander | 0 | 0.0% |
| Some other race | 7 | 0.3% |
| Two or more races | 106 | 5.1% |
| Hispanic or Latino (of any race) | 51 | 2.4% |

=== Income and poverty ===
The median income for a household in the village was $66,250, and the median income for a family was $75,982. Males had a median income of $43,000 versus $20,114 for females. The per capita income for the village was $28,932. About 4.5% of families and 4.7% of the population were below the poverty line, including 6.0% of those under age 18 and 4.8% of those age 65 or over.

== Education ==
Cambridge has a single school district, School District #227, which includes a single elementary school, junior high (attached to the high school), and high school. Cambridge High School graduates around 50-60 students annually. As in many small towns, the cultural life of the community revolves around the arts and sports related to the school. The elementary school was selected as a 2006 Blue Ribbon School, part of the No Child Left Behind Act. It was one of 18 selected in Illinois.

== Notable people ==
- Dan Halldorson, former PGA golfer
- John P. Hand, Chief Justice of the Illinois Supreme Court
- John Hughes, Texas Ranger who was the likely inspiration for The Lone Ranger figure in fiction
- Julia Markham, a woman who murdered her seven children.
- George Allen Neeves, member of the Wisconsin State Assembly
- Brian Phelps 25-year radio host of Los Angeles-based Mark and Brian Show
- Charles F. Wennerstrum, lawyer and justice on the Iowa Supreme Court

== See also ==
- Illinois Route 81
- Illinois Route 82
