= Henry County Courthouse (Illinois) =

Local government building in the United States

- U.S. National Register of Historic Places
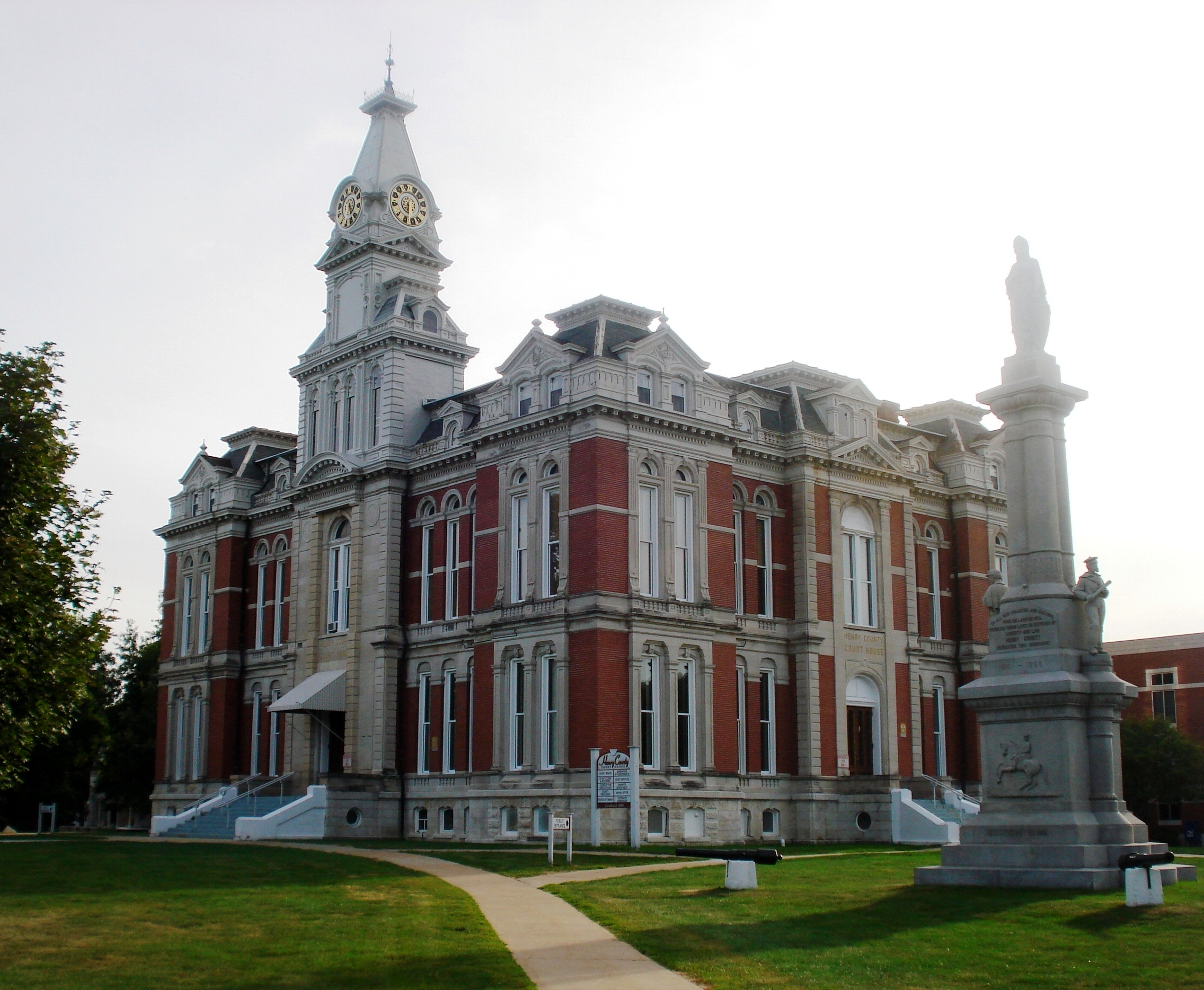

- Location within Illinois Location within the United States
- Interactive map showing the location for Henry County Courthouse
- Location: 307 W. Center St. Cambridge, Illinois
- Coordinates: 41°18′15″N 90°11′48″W
- Area: less than one acre
- Built by: Julian Hinkley
- Architect: Tolan & Son
- Architectural style: Second Empire
- NRHP reference No.: 04000869
- Added to NRHP: August 20, 2004

The Henry County Courthouse, located at 307 West Center Street in Cambridge, is the county courthouse serving Henry County, Illinois. Built in 1878–1880, the courthouse is the fourth used in Henry County and the second built in Cambridge. Prominent Midwestern architects T. J. Tolan and Son designed the courthouses in the Second Empire style. The courthouse's four facades each feature three pavilions, one at the center and one at each edge; the main facade on the east side has a clock tower atop its central pavilion. The building's mansard roof includes several dormers and is surrounded by a dentillated cornice. Decorative stone elements such as moldings, belt courses, and quoins are used throughout the building.

The courthouse was added to the National Register of Historic Places on August 20, 2004.
