= Hindi Zahra =

Moroccan singer (born 1979)

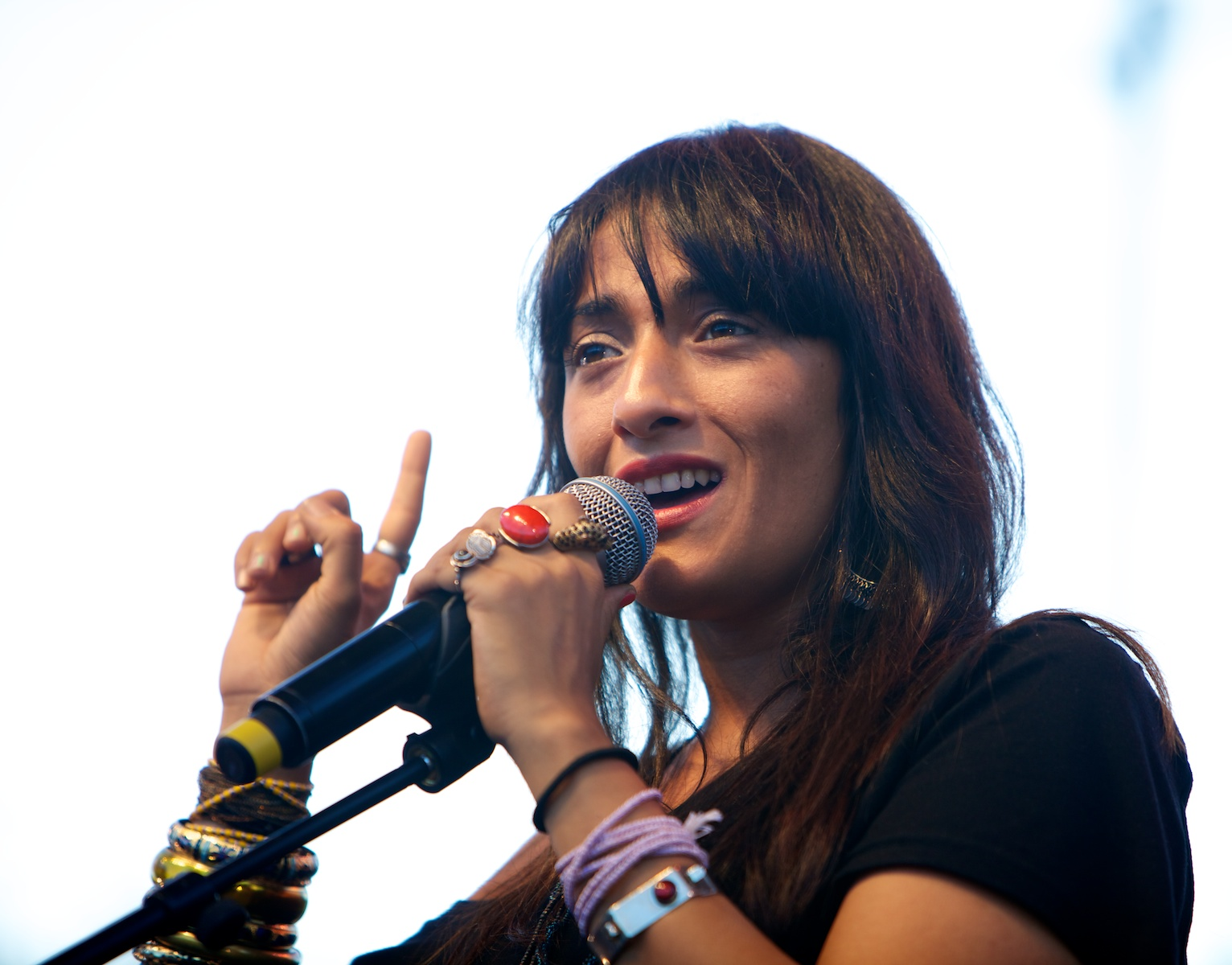
- Zahra at the Nice Jazz Festival 2010

Background information
- Also known as: Zahra Hindi
- Born: 20 January 1979 (age 47)
- Origin: Khouribga, Morocco
- Genres: Berber music, Pop, Soul, Jazz, Folk, Blues, World music
- Occupation: Musician
- Instrument: Vocals
- Years active: 2009–present

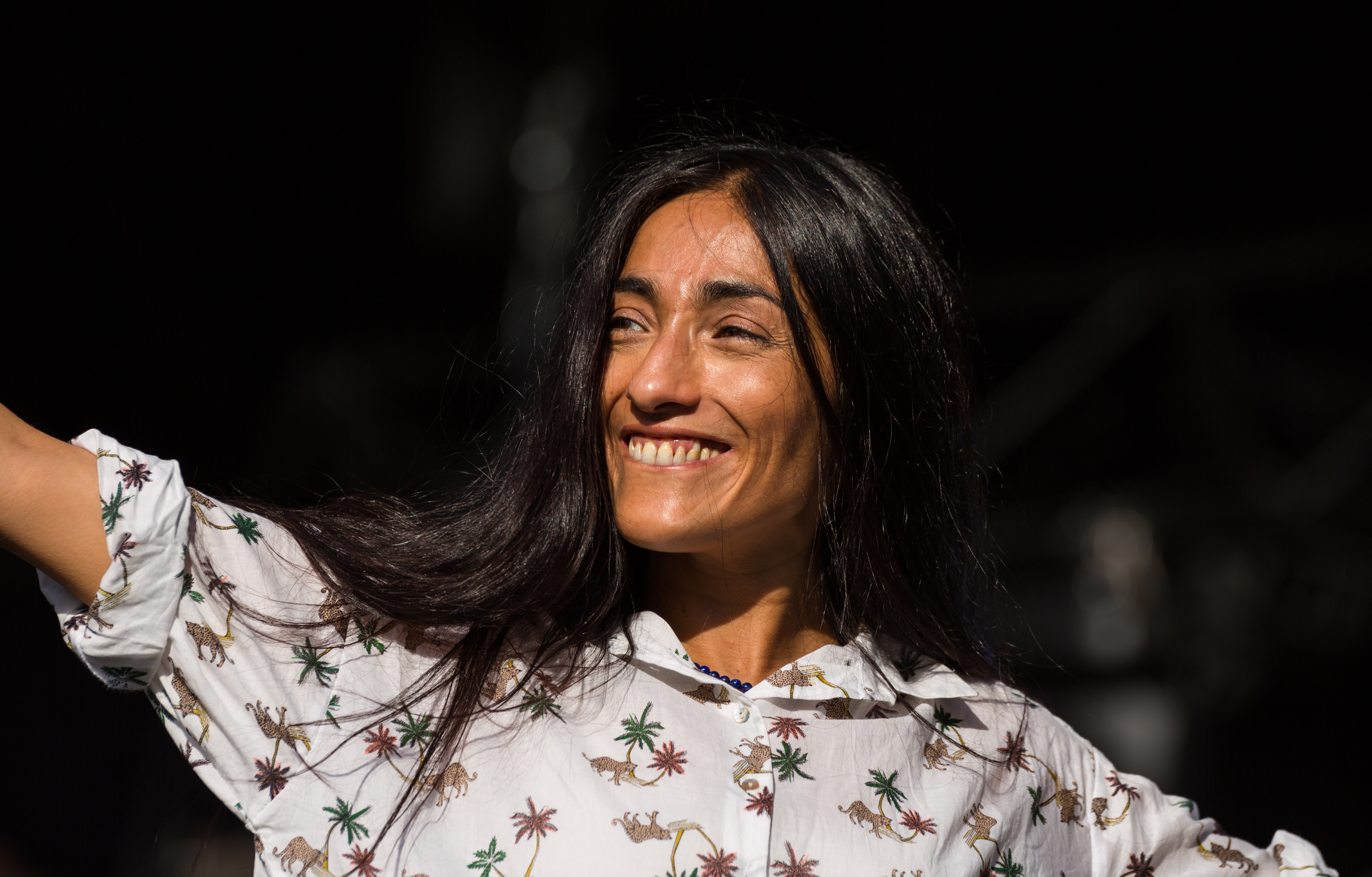
Moroccan singer Hindi Zahra at Pause Guitare, in July, 2015.

Hindi Zahra (Tamazight: ⵀⵉⵏⴷⵉ ⵣⴰⵀⵕⴰ, Arabic: هندي زهرة, born 20 January 1979 in Khouribga, Morocco) is a Moroccan singer. When coming up with a stage name, she simply inverted her birth name. Her songs are mostly in English but some lyrics as in the song "Imik Si Mik" are in the Berber Shilha language.

Influenced by singers like Cheikha Rimitti and Umm Kulthum, Hindi Zahra has drawn comparisons with Beth Gibbons of Portishead, Billie Holiday, Patti Smith, and Norah Jones.

== Career ==
Zahra was raised by her mother, a dancer and actress, in Khouribga, Morocco. At the age of fifteen, she left school and moved to Paris to live with her father, who had been a soldier. At age 18 she worked at the Louvre. She is the sister of Youssef Hindi. Zahra wrote her first lyrics and melodies. She is a self-taught multi-instrumentalist. By 2005 she had written about 50 songs of which Beautiful Tango, Oursoul, Try, and Stand Up were first released on the EP Hindi Zahra in 2009 and eleven songs were recorded on Hindi Zahra's first album which was released in January 2010 at the Jazz label Blue Note Records. The video to the opening song Beautiful Tango was made by French director Tony Gatlif. The song Stand Up was chosen for a commercial campaign by Western Union. In June 2010 she collaborated with French musician Blundetto on his debut album, Bad Bad Things. In November 2010, Hindi Zahra won the Prix Constantin for Best Album. In February 2011, she won the Victoires de la Musique award for the best World music album.

In 2014 she had roles in the films The Narrow Frame of Midnight by Tala Hadid and in The Cut by Fatih Akin.

In April 2015 her second studio album, Homeland, was released.

== Discography ==
=== Albums ===
Year	Album	Peak positions					Certification
Year	Album	BEL (Vl)	BEL (Wa)	FR	SWE	SWI	Certification
2010	Handmade	22	35	17	29	58	
2015	Homeland	64	68	27	–	–	

Others

- 2011: Handmade Deluxe Edition (with previously unreleased songs)

=== EPs ===
- 2009: Hindi Zahra (EP)
- 2011: Until the Next Journey (EP)

=== Singles ===
Year	Single	Peak positions			Album
Year	Single	BEL (Wa)	FR	GER	Album
2010	"Beautiful Tango"	9* (Ultratip)	–	85	Handmade
2015	"Any Story"	–	88	–	Homeland

*Did not appear in the official Belgian Ultratop 50 charts, but in the Ultratip charts.

Other releases

- 2010: "Stand Up"
- 2010: "Imik Si Mik"
- 2011: "Fascination

== Honours ==
On August 22, 2016, she was decorated as a Knight of the Ouissam Al Moukafâa Al Wataniya — the Order of National Merit — by King Mohammed VI.
