= Judge Hand =

Justice Hand or Judge Hand may refer to:

- Augustus C. Hand (1803–1878), justice of the New York Supreme Court, and ex officio a judge of the New York Court of Appeals
- Augustus Noble Hand (1869–1954), judge on the United States District Court for the Southern District of New York and the United States Court of Appeals for the Second Circuit
- George Edward Hand (1809–1889), county probate judge of Wayne County, Michigan
- Learned Hand (1872–1961), judge on the United States District Court for the Southern District of New York and the United States Court of Appeals for the Second Circuit
- Samuel Hand (1834–1886), associate judge of the New York Court of Appeals
- William Brevard Hand (1924–2008), judge of the United States District Court for the Southern District of Alabama

== See also ==
- John P. Hand (1850–1923), chief justice of the Supreme Court of Illinois
