= The Ongoing Concept =

American metal band

- the band in 2023, from left to right: Parker Scholz, Kyle Scholz, TJ Nichols, Andy Crateau and Dawson Scholz

Background information
- Origin: Rathdrum, Idaho, U.S.
- Genres: Post-hardcore; hard rock; metalcore; heavy metal
- Years active: 2009–present
- Label: Solid State
- Members: Dawson Scholz; Andy Crateau; Kyle Scholz; Parker Scholz; TJ Nichols
- Past members: Dyllan Darrington; Ian Nelson; Cody Rhodes
- Website: theongoingconcept.com

The Ongoing Concept is a metal band from Rathdrum, Idaho, formed in 2009. They have released two independent EPs and four studio albums. The band currently consists of vocalist/guitarist Dawson Scholz, vocalist Kyle Scholz, drummer Parker Scholz, bassist/vocalist TJ Nichols and vocalist/guitarist Andy Crateau.

== History ==
The Ongoing Concept was formed in 2009 by brothers Kyle, Dawson, and Parker Scholz, and childhood friend TJ Nichols, while they were still in high school. The band recorded an EP titled What Is My Destiny, which was released independently on April 23, 2010. The EP displayed a stylistic dichotomy between acoustic rock and metalcore. The band followed up with another EP in 2011, titled Arrows Before Bullets, which took a heavier approach, following an electronicore style. Once the EP was released, Darrington departed from the band, with them continuing on as a four-piece.

On June 20, 2013, the band announced their signing to Solid State Records. Along with the announcement, they released their first single, "Cover Girl", off of their debut album Saloon, which released in August 20, 2013. For the Billboard charting week of September 7, 2013, Saloon charted at No. 38 on the Heatseekers Albums chart. Two years later, the band released their sophomore effort Handmade, where they crafted the instruments they used, save for keyboards and microphones, out of a tree they chopped down. Following the album's release, by 2016, Kyle, Parker, and Nichols had departed from the band. Dawson hired on longtime friend and band videographer Ian Nelson on bass, Andy Crateau on guitars, and Cody Rhodes on drums. With the new lineup, the band recorded their third release, titled Places, which exhibited more of a somber style. After the album was issued, the band ceased activity until 2022. With the return of the original lineup along with Crateau, the band announced efforts for a new album in early 2023. The first single, "Prisoner Again", was released on February 3, 2023, along with the preorder for the album, Again, which was released on March 31, 2023.

== Members ==
Current

- Dawson Scholz – vocals, guitar (2009–present)
- Andy Crateau – guitar, vocals (2016–present)
- Parker Scholz – drums (2009–2015, 2021–present), vocals (2009–2010)
- Kyle Scholz – vocals (2011–2015, 2021–present), keyboards and percussion (2009–2015, 2021–present)
- TJ Nichols – bass, vocals (2009–2015, 2021–present)

Former

- Dyllan Darrington – guitar, vocals (2009–2012)
- Ian Nelson – bass (2016–2019)
- Cody Rhodes – drums (2016–2019)

Timeline

== Discography ==
=== Studio albums ===
List of studio albums, with selected chart positions
Title	Album details	Peak chart positions				
Title	Album details	US HEAT	Rock Albums	Indie	Christian	Hard Rock
Saloon	Released: August 20, 2013; Label: Solid State; CD, digital download	38	—	—	—	—
Handmade	Released: June 16, 2015; Label: Solid State; CD, digital download	—	40	27	8	9
Places	Released: October 6, 2017; Label: Solid State; CD, digital download	—	-	-	-	-
Again	Released: March 31, 2023; Label: Solid State; CD, digital download	-	—	—	—	-

Independent EPs

Year	Album	Label
2010	What is My Destiny (EP)	Independent
2011	Arrows Before Bullets (EP)	Independent
