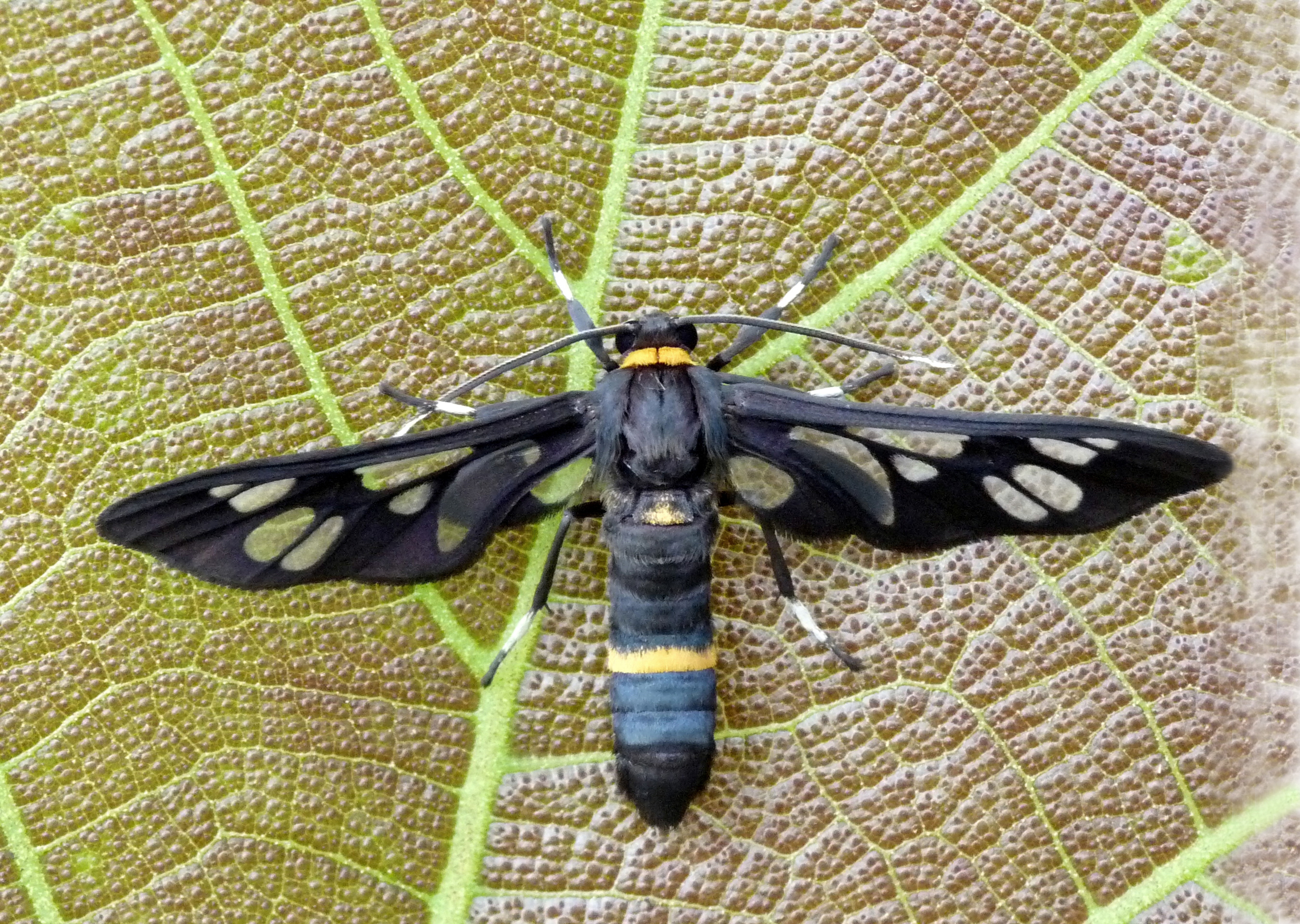
- Syntomoides imaon

Scientific classification
- Kingdom: Animalia
- Phylum: Arthropoda
- Class: Insecta
- Order: Lepidoptera
- Superfamily: Noctuoidea
- Family: Erebidae
- Subfamily: Arctiinae
- Tribe: Syntomini
- Genus: Syntomoides; Hampson, [1893]

= Syntomoides =

Genus of moths

Syntomoides is a genus of moths in the family Erebidae erected by George Hampson in 1893.

The genus is often confused with Ceryx, because in 1898 Hampson used the name Ceryx for this moth, but there was already a genus Ceryx named by Hans Daniel Johan Wallengren in 1863.

== Species ==
This is now considered a monotypic genus with the species Syntomoides imaon (Cramer, [1779]): Syntomis godartii (Boisduval, 1829) is one of several synonyms.
