= Saloon (album) =

Studio album by The Ongoing Concept
- Released: August 20, 2013
- Genre: Christian metal; metalcore; heavy metal; avant-garde metal; southern rock
- Length: 39:54
- Label: Solid State
- Producer: Dawson Scholz

The Ongoing Concept chronology
Arrows Before Bullets EP (2011)	Saloon (2013)	Handmade (2015)

Saloon is the debut studio album for The Ongoing Concept. The album was produced by their vocalist/guitarist Dawson Scholz, and was released on August 20, 2013 through Solid State Records. The album attracted commercial success and positive criticism.

== Critical reception ==
Professional ratings
Review scores
Source	Rating
About.com	4/5 stars
Christian Music Zine	4/5 stars
HM	4/5 stars
Indie Vision Music	3/5 stars
Jesus Freak Hideout	4.5/5 stars
New Release Tuesday	4/5 stars

Saloon garnered positive reception from seven music critics rating and reviews. At HM, David Stagg rated the album four stars out of five, stating the release is "Highly recommended." About.com's Chad Bowar rated the album four stars out of five, writing that the album is "an appealing package." At Jesus Freak Hideout, Michael Weaver rated the album four-and-a-half stars out of five, saying that "The Ongoing Concept have more than delivered on their debut album." Timothy Estabrooks of Jesus Freak Hideout rated the album four stars out of five, stating how it is "off-the-wall yet extremely fun music." At New Release Tuesday, Mary Nikkel rated the album four stars out of five, writing that it "is an incredibly strong first release" that is like a "glass of cold water in a ghost town genre, offering a refreshing dose of unashamed originality amidst a multitude of carbon-copy peers." Christian Music Zine's Anthony Peronto rated the album four stars out of five, saying that it is "groundbreaking material". At Indie Vision Music, Keith Settles rated the album three stars out of five, stating that "though not perfect," the band "is releasing a very well put together album".

== Commercial performance ==
For the Billboard charting week of September 7, 2013, Saloon charted at No. 38 on the Heatseekers Albums chart.

== Track listing ==
All tracks are written by The Ongoing Concept.

Tracklist
No.	Title	Length
1.	"Let's Deal the Cards Again"	1:08
2.	"Saloon"	3:39
3.	"You Are the One"	4:14
4.	"Cover Girl"	4:12
5.	"Little Situation"	4:49
6.	"Sunday's Revival"	3:08
7.	"Sidelines"	4:02
8.	"Failures & Fakes"	3:25
9.	"Like Autumn"	3:28
10.	"Class of Twenty-ten"	3:02
11.	"Goodbye, So Long My Love"	4:47
Total length:		39:54

== Chart performance ==
Chart (2013)	Peak position
US Heatseekers Albums (Billboard)	38
