= Handel (disambiguation) =

George Frideric Handel (1685–1759) was a German/British Baroque composer.

Handel may also refer to:

== Places ==
- Handel Ice Piedmont, Alexander Island, Antarctica
- Handel, Saskatchewan, a village in Canada
- Handel, Netherlands, a village in Gemert-Bakel, the Netherlands
- 3826 Handel, a small main-belt asteroid
- Handel (crater), a crater on Mercury

== Business ==
- Handel Architects, a firm founded in New York in 1994
- Handel's Homemade Ice Cream & Yogurt, an ice cream parlor franchise
- Swedish Commercial Employees' Union or Handels

== Other uses ==
- Handel (name)
- HANDEL, the UK's National Attack Warning System in the Cold War
- Handel Medallion, an award presented by the City of New York
- Handel Prize, an award presented by Halle, Germany
- Sir Handel, a character from Thomas the Tank Engine and Friends
- Pip, the protagonist of Dickens' novel Great Expectations, called "Handel" by another character

== See also ==
- Handel-C, a programming language
- Handle (disambiguation)
- Handler (disambiguation)
- Hendel
- Hendl
