= Barber–Say syndrome =

Rare congenital disorder

Barber Say syndrome
- Other names: Hypertrichosis-atrophic skin-ectropion-macrostomia syndrome
- Barber-Say syndrome has an autosomal dominant pattern of inheritance
- Usual onset: Neonatal
- Differential diagnosis: Treacher Collins syndrome

Barber-Say syndrome (BSS) is a very rare congenital disorder associated with excessive hair growth (hypertrichosis), fragile (atrophic) skin, eyelid deformities (ectropion), and an overly broad mouth (macrostomia).

Barber-Say syndrome is phenotypically similar to Ablepharon macrostomia syndrome, which is also associated with dominant mutations in TWIST2.

== Signs and symptoms ==
- Severe hypertrichosis, especially of the back
- Skin abnormalities, including hyperlaxity and redundancy
- Facial dysmorphism, including macrostomia
- Eyelid deformities
- Abnormal and low-set ears
- Bulbous nasal tip with hypoplastic alae nasi
- Low frontal hairline

== Genetics ==
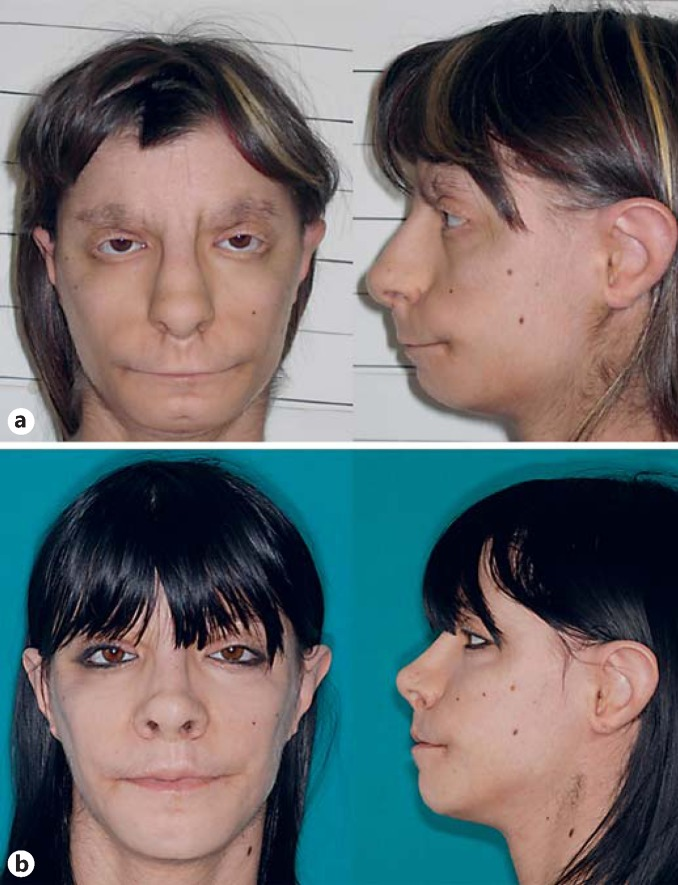
An adult female with Barber-Say syndrome before (a) and after (b) multiple maxillofacial and facial plastic surgery interventions.

Multiple cases of parent-to-child transmission suggest that Barber-Say syndrome exhibits autosomal dominant inheritance. Exome sequencing and expression studies have shown that BSS is caused by mutations in the TWIST2 gene that affect a highly conserved residue of TWIST2 (twist-related protein 2). TWIST2 is a basic helix-loop-helix transcription factor that binds to E-box DNA motifs (5'-CANNTG-3') as a heterodimer and inhibits transcriptional activation. Because TWIST2 mediates mesenchymal stem cell differentiation and prevents premature or ectopic osteoblast differentiation, mutations in TWIST2 that disrupt these functions by altering DNA-binding activity could explain many of the phenotypes of BSS.

== Epidemiology ==
The prevalence of Barber Say syndrome is less than 1 in 1,000,000. As of 2017, only 15 cases have been reported in the literature.
