= Adjustment handle =

Adjustment handles are a way to facilitate the construction of e.g. a cubic Bézier curve.

In graphical user interfaces, the control element adjustment handle is a small box that appears on the corners and edges of a selected element such as another graphical control element like a window. This allows the user to alter size or shape.

By dragging and dropping the control handle onto an edge, the user can make the control wider or narrower, taller or shorter. Corner handles let one move two edges at once.

An adjustment handle can also be used in audio editing software.
