= Hand Lake =

Lake in the state of Minnesota, United States

- Location within Minnesota
- Location: Otter Tail County, Minnesota
- Coordinates: 46°42′23″N 95°54′12″W
- Type: lake

Hand Lake is a lake in Otter Tail County, in the U.S. state of Minnesota.

Hand Lake was so named on account of its outline being shaped like a human hand.

== See also ==
- List of lakes in Minnesota
