= Hands (surname) =

Hands is a surname. Notable people with the surname include:

- Alice Hands, co-founder of the architectural firm Gannon and Hands
- Arthur Hands (1894–1965), British photographer
- Bill Hands (1940–2017), American baseball player
- Greg Hands (born 1965), British politician
- Guy Hands (born 1959), English financier and investor
- Israel Hands, 18th-century pirate
- Jaylen Hands (born 1999), American basketball player
- Ken Hands (1926–2017), Australian football player and coach
- Kenneth Hands (1892–1954), South African cricketer
- Marina Hands (born 1975), French actress
- Philip Hands (1890–1951), South African cricketer
- Reginald Hands (1888–1918), South African cricketer
- Terry Hands (1941–2020), English theatre director

== See also ==
- Mr. Hands (disambiguation)
- Hand (surname)
