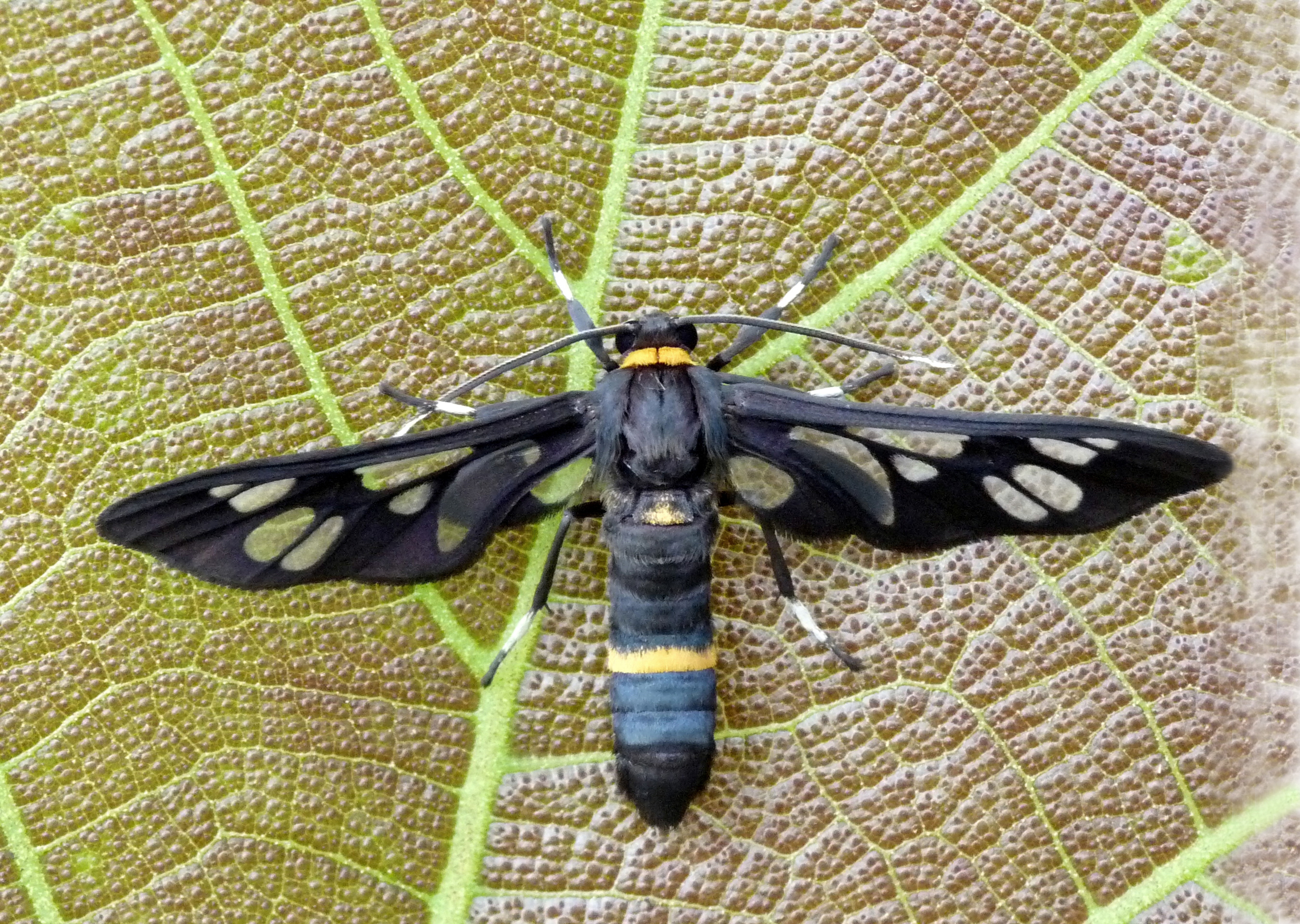

Scientific classification
- Kingdom: Animalia
- Phylum: Arthropoda
- Clade: Pancrustacea
- Class: Insecta
- Order: Lepidoptera
- Superfamily: Noctuoidea
- Family: Erebidae
- Subfamily: Arctiinae
- Genus: Syntomoides
- Species: S. imaon

Binomial name
- Syntomoides imaon (Cramer, 1780)

Synonyms
- Sphinx imaon Cramer, [1779]; Syntomis godarti Boisduval, 1829; Syntomis fusiformis Walker, 1856; Syntomis approximata Walker, [1865]; Syntomis libera Walker, [1865]; Syntomis fytchei Moore, 1871; Syntomis cupreipennis Butler, 1876; Syntomis artina Butler, 1876; Syntomis sargania Butler, 1879; Syntomis mota Swinhoe, 1891; Ceryx godarti; Ceryx imaon

= Syntomoides imaon =

Handmaiden moth

Species of moth

Syntomoides imaon, the handmaiden moth, is a moth of subfamily Arctiinae, subtribe Ctenuchina. The systematics of the subfamily has been revised. It was described by Pieter Cramer in 1780. It is found in Pakistan (Sindh), India (Sikkim, Khasi hills, Tamil Nadu, Kerala), Sri Lanka, Myanmar, Bangladesh, Nepal, China (Hong Kong), Thailand and Vietnam.

== Description ==
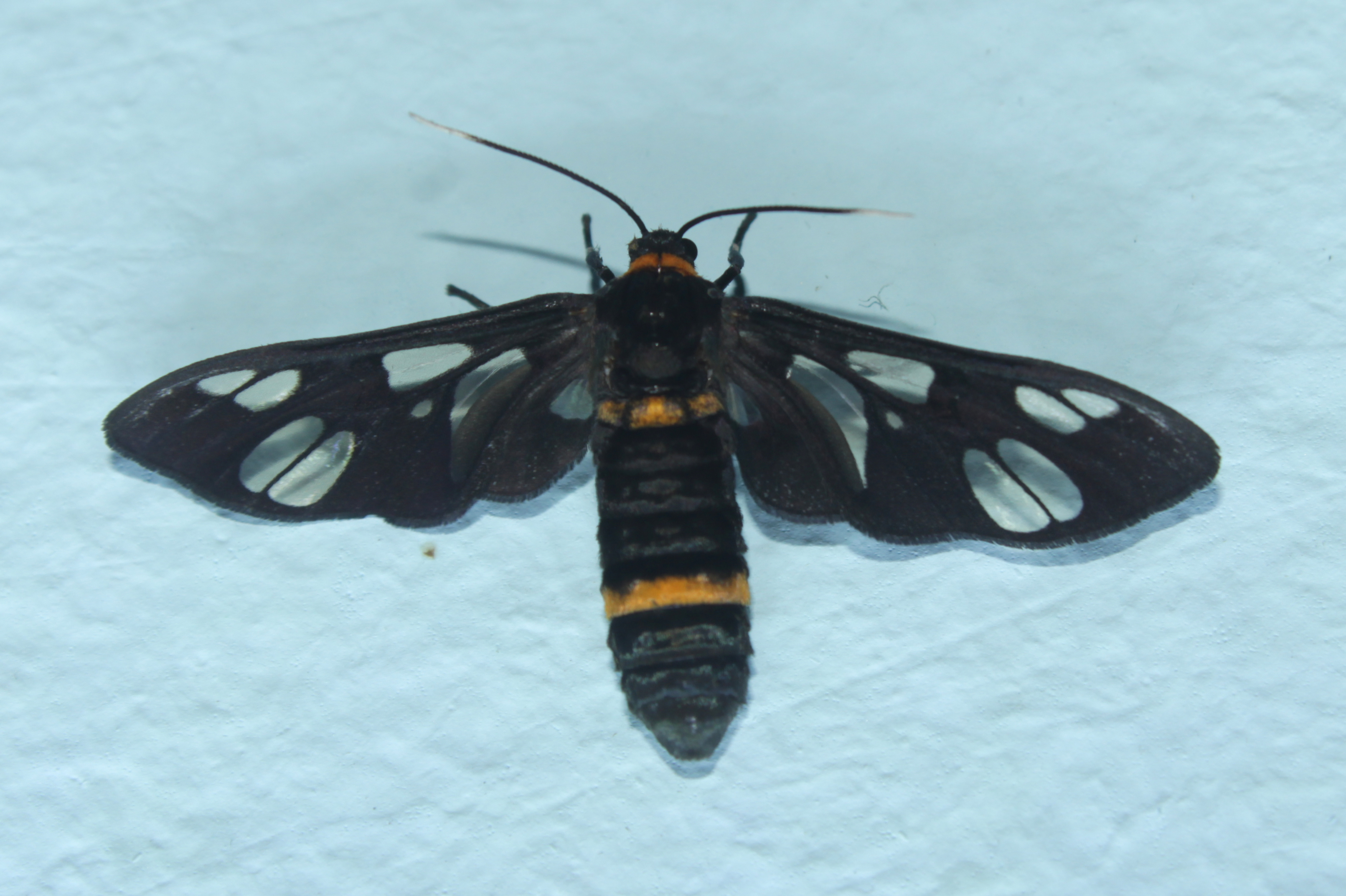
In Kanjirappally, Kerala.

The moth has a wingspan of 34 mm. The frons and collar are yellow with the metathorax having a yellow streak. The first abdominal segment has a yellow band which is sometimes obsolescent. The forewing has large hyaline patches, one filling the cell, another filling nearly the whole interno-median interspace, one at junction of veins 2 and 3, two subapical, and two submarginal. In the form S. i. sargania, there is a long streak between veins 5 and 6. In others it is reduced to a spot or may be lacking entirely. The hindwing has a postbasal hyaline patch extending hardly (or not at all) beyond the cell. The tips of the antennae and proximal joints of the tarsi are white. The spots of the forewing vary considerably in size. The male individual is slender and long abdomen than female.
