= Johann Christian Simon Handt =

German Lutheran minister (1794–1863)

Johann Heermann
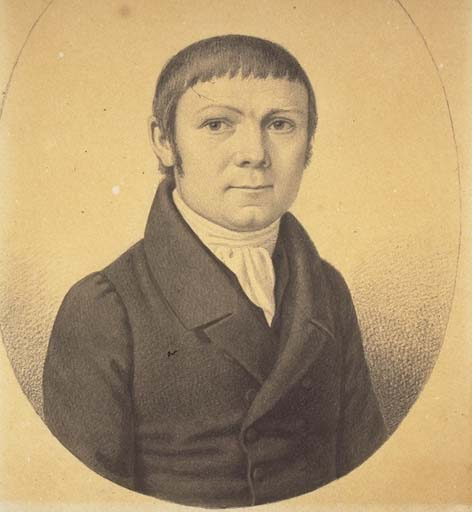
- Handt in 1827
- Born: 1794
- Died: July 7, 1863; Geelong, Victoria, Australia
- Occupation: Missionary

Johann Christian Simon Handt (born Johann Christian Simon Hundt; 1794 – 7 July 1863) was a German-born Australian minister and missionary of Lutheran faith. Known for being Queensland's first missionary or one of the first, Handt is also said to have brought in the first pineapples in Queensland.

== Early life ==
Handt was born Johann Christian Simon Hundt in 1794. One source lists his birthplace as Aken-on-the-Elbe, Saxony, Germany, others list Prussia. His mother died in 1813 and his father in 1816. He changed his surname to "Handt" after being constantly laughed at for his surname sounding like "Hund" (German for "dog"). Handt went on to become a tailor before enrolling as a missionary; in 1822, Handt moved to Switzerland to attend the Basle Missionary Institute in Basel. He graduated in January 1827.

== Career and personal life ==
In around 1830, the London Missionary Society dispatched Handt to work with natives in Australia, alongside a few other Germans. Handt reached Sydney on 25 June 1831. That year, he travelled with his wife to Wellington, New South Wales, to start missionary work for the New South Wales Church Mission Society. Their work came to an end when one of them (Note: According to one source, it was his wife who fell sick, while according to another, it was Handt who did.) came down with an illness and the couple were forced to return to Sydney. He is credited as the first German missionary in New South Wales, and one of the first missionaries in Queensland.

Handt is credited with having brought in the first pineapples in Queensland. Handt married Mary Crook (died 1844), the eldest daughter of educator and missionary William Pascoe Cook, in July 1832. They had three children — Sarah, Wilhelm, (Note: Also William.) and Ambrosius. Handt was a Lutheran.

== Final years ==
One source states that Handt died at a prison hospital in Geelong, Victoria, on 7 July 1863, aged 70. Another source writes that he died at his residence in Bond Street, Chillwell. It is unclear as to where Handt is buried.
