= Hands (indie rock band) =

- Origin: Los Angeles, California, United States
- Genres: Indie rock, Indie pop
- Years active: 2012–present
- Label: Kill Rock Stars
- Members: Geoff Halliday, Ryan Sweeney
- Website: www.handssounds.com

Hands is an indie rock band from Los Angeles, California. The band was founded in 2012 and previously released an EP, Massive Context, on Small Plates Records. Their first single was debuted by Nylon Magazine in April 2012. The band also released a 7” on White Iris Records in January 2013. In January, the band signed to Kill Rock Stars and announced that its forthcoming debut full-length, Synesthesia, would be released by the label on April 30, 2013. The first single from the album, "Trouble", was debuted exclusively on Stereogum, and the band performed at SXSW in 2013. On January 9, 2013, Lauren Laverne featured "Trouble" between Depeche Mode and Veronica Falls on BBC6., and later featured it as the BBC MPFree of the day. On January 23, 2013, Nylon Magazine premiered the first single from their new 7" release on White Iris Records. The track, entitled "All I Want To Know", was subsequently featured by Filter Magazine.

Hands performed at Kill Rock Stars' SXSW showcase in 2013, and was featured in ABC News' 7 Emerging Artists On The Rise article. On March 25, 2013, Hands was named New Band Of The Day by The Guardian.

== Formation ==
Geoff Halliday (vocals, keyboards) and Ryan Sweeney (guitar) started as a two-piece band in Philadelphia before moving to the Silver Lake neighborhood of Los Angeles and adding Sean Hess (drums) and Alex Staniloff (bass guitar) to the lineup.

Hands was featured on Time Magazine’s list of “11 bands you don’t know (but should)” and has performed at notable events such as SXSW, CMJ, DeLuna Fest, and Echo Park Rising. Hands was prominently featured in a live music video sponsored by Converse and Filter, and in October 2012 Hands was featured on Daytrotter’s sessions.

== Discography ==
- Massive Context (2012, Small Plates Records)
- Untitled 7" (2013, White Iris Records)
- Synesthesia (2013, Kill Rock Stars)
