= Handmade (The Ongoing Concept album) =

Studio album by the Ongoing Concept
- Released: June 16, 2015
- Genre: Avant-garde metal; experimental rock; metalcore; post-hardcore; art punk; mathcore
- Length: 31:31
- Label: Solid State
- Producer: Dawson Scholz

The Ongoing Concept chronology
Saloon (2013)	Handmade (2015)	Places (2017)

Handmade is the second studio album from the Ongoing Concept. Solid State Records released the album on June 16, 2015.

== Critical reception ==
Professional ratings
Review scores
Source	Rating
CCM Magazine	4/5 stars
Cross Rhythms	9/10 squares
Indie Vision Music	4/5 stars
Jesus Freak Hideout	4.5/5 stars
Jesus Wired	9.5/10 stars
New Noise Magazine	5/5 stars
New Release Today	4/5 stars
PPCORN	4.3 stars on a 5 point scale

Matt Conner, rating the album four stars for CCM Magazine, describes, "an album that stays true to its name with handmade instruments and an even greater imaginative slant." Awarding the album four and a half stars from Jesus Freak Hideout, Wayne Reimer states, "there is certainly no shortage of talent or creativity on Handmade." Ian Webber, indicating in a nine out of ten review by Cross Rhythms, says, "the Ongoing Concept have succeeded in producing a clever, surprising sound that sees them finding their own artistically inventive niche."

Natasha Van Duser, giving the album five stars at New Noise Magazine, writes, "For being built from scratch, Handmade is a pretty impressive cake to pull out of the oven." Rating the album four stars by Indie Vision Music, Brody Barbour says, "the Ongoing Concept have delivered another unique, high energy album." Mary Nikkel, awarding the album four stars at New Release Today, states, "With Handmade the Ongoing Concept has crafted yet another post-hardcore masterpiece, with their personal fingerprints on every note."

Giving the album nine and a half stars out of ten for Jesus Wired, Topher P. writes, "it expands the band’s sonic horizons while staying true to form." Mark Johnson, rating the album 4.3 out of five stars from PPCORN, says, "This distinctive, interesting take on song-writing makes Handmade an uplifting, enjoyable record", while this creates an "unapologetic attitude [where it] comes across directly in their music, making Handmade a very personal and relatable record."

== Track listing ==
No.	Title	Length
1.	"Handmade"	0:51
2.	"Amends"	3:26
3.	"Feel"	3:02
4.	"Trophy"	3:38
5.	"Prisoner"	3:14
6.	"Melody"	3:58
7.	"Unwanted"	2:43
8.	"Soul"	3:26
9.	"Survivor"	3:02
10.	"Falling"	4:11
Total length:		31:31

== Chart performance ==
Chart (2015)	Peak position
US Top Christian Albums (Billboard)	8
US Top Hard Rock Albums (Billboard)	9
US Independent Albums (Billboard)	27
US Top Rock Albums (Billboard)	40
