= Handmade (Hindi Zahra album) =

Studio album by Hindi Zahra
- Released: 2010
- Label: EMI/Blue Note

Professional ratings
Review scores
Source	Rating
The Guardian	link
The Times	link

Handmade is the debut album by Hindi Zahra, released in 2010. A Deluxe edition was released in 2011 that also included previously unreleased tracks.

== Track listing ==
=== Handmade (2010 edition) ===
No.	Title	Length
1.	"Beautiful Tango"	3:58
2.	"Oursoul"	3:18
3.	"Fascination"	3:39
4.	"Set Me Free"	4:04
5.	"Kiss & Thrills"	3:51
6.	"At the Same Time"	3:23
7.	"Imik Si Mik"	3:53
8.	"Stand Up"	4:40
9.	"Music"	3:49
10.	"Don't Forget"	3:47
11.	"Old Friends"	3:02

=== Handmade Deluxe edition (2011) ===
Same as 2010 edition with the additional unplugged tracks:

- 12. "Ahiawa" (Unplugged)
- 13. "The Man I Love" (Unplugged)
- 14. "Beautiful Tango" (Unplugged)
- 15. "Oursoul" (Unplugged)
- 16. "He Needs Me" (Unplugged)
- 17. "Don't Forget" (Unplugged)

== Certifications ==
Region	Certification	Certified units/sales
France (SNEP)	Gold	50,000^{*}
^{*} Sales figures based on certification alone.
