= HAND2 =

Protein-coding gene in the species Homo sapiens

Identifiers
- Aliases: HAND2, DHed, Thing2, bHLHa26, dHand, heart and neural crest derivatives expressed 2
- External IDs: OMIM: 602407; MGI: 103580; GeneCards: HAND2

Gene location (Human)
Chr.	Chromosome 4 (human)
Band	4q34.1	Start	173,524,969 bp
Band	4q34.1	End	173,530,229 bp

Gene location (Mouse)
Chr.	Chromosome 8 (mouse)
Band	8 B2|8 29.8 cM	Start	57,774,018 bp
Band	8 B2|8 29.8 cM	End	57,777,668 bp
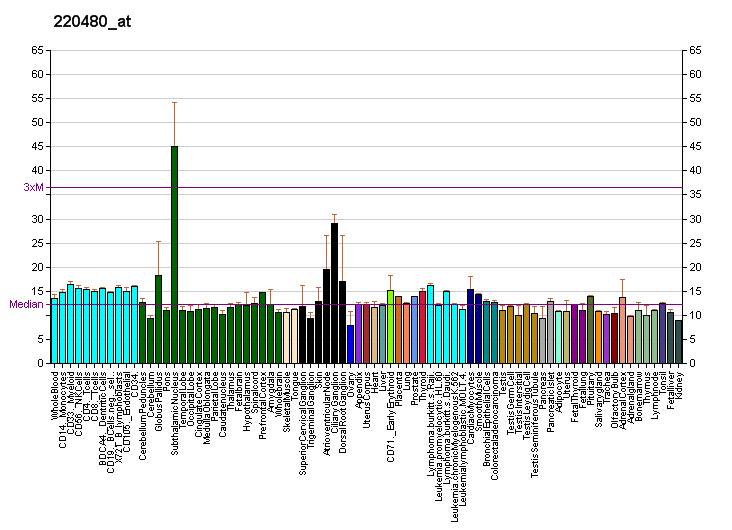
RNA expression pattern
Bgee	Human / Mouse (ortholog); Top expressed in: muscle layer of sigmoid colon; apex of heart; body of uterus; right auricle of heart; canal of the cervix; ascending aorta; Descending thoracic aorta; left ventricle; left coronary artery; stromal cell of endometrium / Top expressed in: gastrula; decidua; endocardial cushion; abdominal wall; external carotid artery; mandibular prominence; internal carotid artery; atrioventricular valve; bulbus cordis; atrium; More reference expression data
BioGPS	More reference expression data
Gene ontology
Molecular function	DNA binding; sequence-specific DNA binding; RNA polymerase II transcription regulatory region sequence-specific DNA binding; protein homodimerization activity; protein dimerization activity; minor groove of adenine-thymine-rich DNA binding; transcription coactivator activity; DNA-binding transcription activator activity, RNA polymerase II-specific; transcription factor binding; E-box binding; protein binding; protein heterodimerization activity; DNA-binding transcription factor activity, RNA polymerase II-specific
Cellular component	transcription regulator complex; nucleus; protein-containing complex
Biological process	positive regulation of transcription regulatory region DNA binding; peripheral nervous system neuron development; roof of mouth development; apoptotic process involved in heart morphogenesis; noradrenergic neuron differentiation; cell differentiation; mesenchymal cell proliferation; determination of heart left/right asymmetry; regulation of transcription, DNA-templated; sympathetic nervous system development; tongue development; neural crest cell development; cell proliferation involved in outflow tract morphogenesis; adult heart development; cardiac right ventricle formation; thymus development; mesenchyme development; cardiac neural crest cell migration involved in outflow tract morphogenesis; negative regulation of DNA binding; coronary artery morphogenesis; embryonic digit morphogenesis; positive regulation of transcription from RNA polymerase II promoter involved in norepinephrine biosynthetic process; visceral serous pericardium development; heart morphogenesis; negative regulation of apoptotic process; in utero embryonic development; negative regulation of DNA-binding transcription factor activity; negative regulation of osteoblast differentiation; transcription, DNA-templated; cardiac neural crest cell development involved in outflow tract morphogenesis; positive regulation of transcription, DNA-templated; heart looping; odontogenesis of dentin-containing tooth; positive regulation of semaphorin-plexin signaling pathway involved in outflow tract morphogenesis; multicellular organism development; negative regulation of cardiac muscle cell apoptotic process; development of the heart; regulation of secondary heart field cardioblast proliferation; angiogenesis; cartilage morphogenesis; positive regulation of transcription by RNA polymerase II; suckling behavior; regulation of tissue remodeling; negative regulation of gene expression; positive regulation of ERK1 and ERK2 cascade; positive regulation of p38MAPK cascade; positive regulation of cardiac muscle hypertrophy; positive regulation of gene expression; transcription by RNA polymerase II; primary palate development
Sources:Amigo / QuickGO
Orthologs
Databases	NCBI: entry; OMA: entry
Species	Human	Mouse
Entrez	9464	15111
Ensembl	ENSG00000164107	ENSMUSG00000038193
UniProt	P61296	Q61039
RefSeq (mRNA)	NM_021973	NM_010402
RefSeq (protein)	NP_068808	NP_034532
Location (UCSC)	Chr 4: 173.52 – 173.53 Mb	Chr 8: 57.77 – 57.78 Mb
PubMed search
- Wikidata
View/Edit Human	View/Edit Mouse

Heart- and neural crest derivatives-expressed protein 2 is a protein that in humans is encoded by the HAND2 gene.

== Function ==
The protein encoded by this gene belongs to the basic helix-loop-helix family of transcription factors. This gene product is one of two closely related family members, the HAND proteins Hand1 and Hand2, which are asymmetrically expressed in the developing ventricular chambers and play an essential role in cardiac morphogenesis. Working in a complementary fashion, they function in the formation of the right ventricle and aortic arch arteries, implicating them as mediators of congenital heart disease. In addition, this transcription factor plays an important role in limb and branchial arch development. In one study, it was found that a missense mutation of the Hand2 protein in patients with the congenital heart disease (CHD) Tetralogy of Fallot experienced significantly decreased Hand2 interactions with other key developmental genes such as GATA4 and NKX2.5. Hand2 mutations have the potential to be genes for the future study of right ventricle stenosis and its pathogenesis. In avian species, Hand2 has been shown to be expressed in developing gut tissue and is believed to contribute to the formation of enteric neurons.

Hand2 also plays a critical role in the establishment of a proper implantation environment for pregnancy in mice and humans. The induction of Hand2 by progesterone-dependent mechanisms in uterine stromal tissue suppresses fibroblast growth factors (FGFs) that would otherwise stimulate estrogen producing pathways and impair embryo implantation.

In addition, Hand2 also plays a role in lower jaw formation and tongue morphogenesis in mice by suppressing the homeobox genes Dlx5 and Dlx6.

It has been also suggested based on in vitro studies that HAND2 and its associated antisense long noncoding RNA HAND2-AS1 (partially overlapping HAND2 first exon and regulatory promotor region), may have an essential role in fine-tuning mesenchymal-to-epithelial/endothelial (MET) plasticity. In that study basal expression levels of HAND2 were necessary to maintain human mesenchymal stem cell identity, high expression levels were associated with MET towards an endothelial phenotype, and complete knockout (KO) resulted in a senescent-like hypertrophic and cell-cycle arrested phenotypes. That same study also demonstrated by data mining and bioinformatic analyses the preservation of basal human HAND2/HAND2-AS1 expression levels across many different tissues, during embryonic development and in normal homeostatic adult tissue samples. They further demonstrated that deviation from those basal expression levels (up or down regulation) is associated with a long list of pathologies including many different metastasizing cancer types, which may be explained, at least in part by the speculative role of HAND2/HAND2-AS1 in regulation of MET states. Nevertheless, additional studies are required to further elucidate the involvement of HAND2/HAND2-AS1 in these processes, which may represent a promising therapeutic target for many related pathologies.

== Interactions ==
HAND2 has been shown to interact with GATA4, NKX2.5, PPP2R5D, PHOX2A., TWIST1, and TWIST2.

== Clinical significance ==
Hand2 interactions with TWIST1 and TWIST2 genes are critical for proper limb development. Recent literature shows over dosage of Hand2 can result in many defects in the limbs, face, heart, and lower lumbar vertebrae. In this instance, trisomy of the hand2 gene can directly cause human congenital heart disease.

Hand2 gene hypermethylation and epigenetic silencing has also been implicated to increase the development of endometrial cancer. Mounting evidence showing its methylation increased chances of premalignant endometrial lesions. Hand2, in addition to its other functions in the developing heart and limbs, has been found to be an important transcription factor seen in the endometrial stroma. In fact, in mice with the Hand2 gene knocked out, they developed premalignant lesions as they grew older, further providing evidence of its role in endometrial cancer development. These findings have led to Hand2 becoming a potentially promising biomarker for early detection of endometrial cancer and may be used to predict its treatment.

== Regulation of Hand2 ==
HAND2 is an important transcription factor in development of the endothelial to mesenchymal transition (EMT) which allows for the development of the cardiac cushion in the atrioventricular canal which forms the mitral and tricuspid valves. The Hand2 gene regulatory network contains many genes that function in the EMT process, most notably Snail1, whose expression is lost if Hand2 is deficient. Since HAND2 is essential for separation of the atria and ventricles, a mutation in this gene has been linked to ventricular septal defects. Deficiency in HAND2 is only partially replaced by SNAIL1. The expression of Hand2 is regulated by an upstream long non-coding RNA called Upperhand (Uph, the murine equivalent of the human HAND2-AS1 gene) that is needed for RNA polymerase II to transcribe Hand2. If Uph is not present, then there is a decrease in the expression of Hand2 and thus a decrease in cardiac development. When Uph was knocked out, the right ventricular chamber did not develop and had a similar phenotype as when Hand2 is knocked out. In addition, Hand2 expression was absent in the atria, ventricles, and outflow tract of the heart and was reduced in the brachial arches and limb buds.
