= Twist-related protein 2 =

Protein-coding gene in the species Homo sapiens

TWIST2

Identifiers
- Aliases: TWIST2, DERMO1, FFDD3, SETLSS, bHLHa39, AMS, BBRSAY, twist family bHLH transcription factor 2
- External IDs: OMIM: 607556; MGI: 104685; GeneCards: TWIST2

Gene location (Human)
Chr.	Chromosome 2 (human)
Band	2q37.3	Start	238,848,032 bp
Band	2q37.3	End	238,910,534 bp

Gene location (Mouse)
Chr.	Chromosome 1 (mouse)
Band	1|1 D	Start	91,729,183 bp
Band	1|1 D	End	91,775,750 bp
RNA expression pattern
Bgee	Human / Mouse (ortholog); Top expressed in: stromal cell of endometrium; canal of the cervix; ectocervix; subcutaneous adipose tissue; vagina; lactiferous gland; left uterine tube; left ovary; right ovary; body of uterus / Top expressed in: dermis; maxillary prominence; mandibular prominence; umbilical cord; efferent ductule; vas deferens; condyle; lamina propria of urethra; fossa; skin of abdomen; More reference expression data
BioGPS	n/a
Gene ontology
Molecular function	DNA binding; protein binding; protein dimerization activity
Cellular component	cytoplasm; nucleus; nucleolus
Biological process	multicellular organism development; cell differentiation; negative regulation of apoptotic process; negative regulation of transcription, DNA-templated; regulation of transcription, DNA-templated; negative regulation of osteoblast differentiation; transcription, DNA-templated; positive regulation of cell migration
Sources:Amigo / QuickGO
Orthologs
Databases	NCBI: entry; OMA: entry
Species	Human	Mouse
Entrez	117581	13345
Ensembl	ENSG00000233608; ENSG00000288335	ENSMUSG00000007805
UniProt	Q8WVJ9	Q9D030
RefSeq (mRNA)	NM_001271893; NM_057179	NM_007855
RefSeq (protein)	NP_001258822; NP_476527	NP_031881
Location (UCSC)	Chr 2: 238.85 – 238.91 Mb	Chr 1: 91.73 – 91.78 Mb
PubMed search
- Wikidata
View/Edit Human	View/Edit Mouse

Twist-related protein 2 is a protein that in humans is encoded by the TWIST2 gene. The protein encoded by this gene is a basic helix-loop-helix (bHLH) transcription factor and shares similarity with another bHLH transcription factor, TWIST1. bHLH transcription factors have been implicated in cell lineage determination and differentiation. It is thought that during osteoblast development, this protein may inhibit osteoblast maturation and maintain cells in a preosteoblast phenotype.

== Interactions ==
TWIST2 has been shown to interact with SREBF1.

== Clinical significance ==
Mutations in the TWIST2 gene that alter DNA-binding activity through both dominant-negative and gain-of-function effects are associated with ablepharon macrostomia syndrome and Barber–Say syndrome.
