= HAND1 =

Protein-coding gene in the species Homo sapiens

Identifiers
- Aliases: HAND1, Hxt, Thing1, bHLHa27, eHand, heart and neural crest derivatives expressed 1
- External IDs: OMIM: 602406; MGI: 103577; GeneCards: HAND1

Gene location (Human)
Chr.	Chromosome 5 (human)
Band	5q33.2	Start	154,474,972 bp
Band	5q33.2	End	154,478,227 bp

Gene location (Mouse)
Chr.	Chromosome 11 (mouse)
Band	11 B1.3|11 35.27 cM	Start	57,719,531 bp
Band	11 B1.3|11 35.27 cM	End	57,723,644 bp
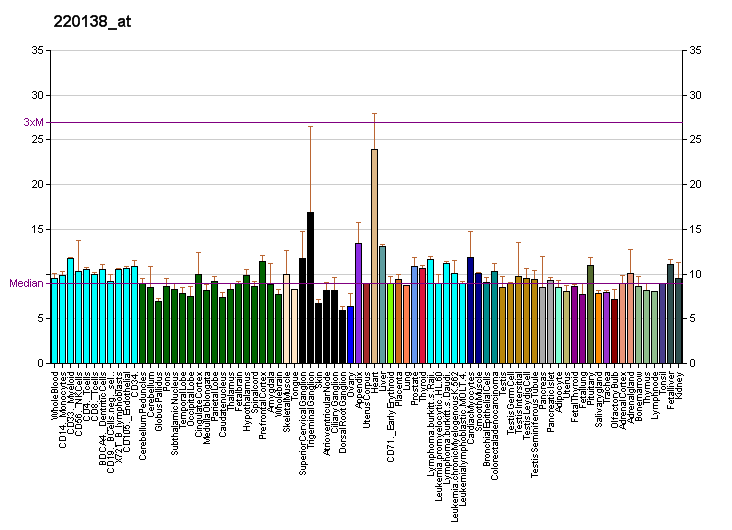
RNA expression pattern
Bgee	Human / Mouse (ortholog); Top expressed in: muscle layer of sigmoid colon; gonad; apex of heart; left ventricle; amniotic fluid; right ventricle; myocardium; myocardium of left ventricle; buccal mucosa cell; appendix / Top expressed in: primordial ventricle; yolk sac; thoracic ganglia; trophoblast giant cell; placenta; embryo; morula; urethra; male urethra; mesothelium of parietal serous pericardium; More reference expression data
BioGPS	More reference expression data
Gene ontology
Molecular function	DNA binding; sequence-specific DNA binding; protein dimerization activity; protein homodimerization activity; transcription corepressor activity; transcription coactivator activity; transcription factor binding; RNA polymerase II cis-regulatory region sequence-specific DNA binding; DNA-binding transcription repressor activity, RNA polymerase II-specific; bHLH transcription factor binding; protein binding; identical protein binding; protein heterodimerization activity; enzyme binding; DNA-binding transcription factor activity, RNA polymerase II-specific
Cellular component	cytoplasm; nucleoplasm; RNA polymerase II transcription regulator complex; nucleolus; nucleus
Biological process	trophoblast giant cell differentiation; cell differentiation; determination of heart left/right asymmetry; regulation of transcription, DNA-templated; cardiac septum morphogenesis; cardiac left ventricle formation; cardiac right ventricle formation; mesenchyme development; mesoderm formation; in utero embryonic development; negative regulation of transcription by RNA polymerase II; embryonic heart tube formation; transcription by RNA polymerase II; negative regulation of DNA-binding transcription factor activity; transcription, DNA-templated; embryonic heart tube development; multicellular organism development; heart looping; odontogenesis of dentin-containing tooth; ventricular cardiac muscle tissue morphogenesis; positive regulation of transcription, DNA-templated; development of the heart; negative regulation of RNA polymerase II regulatory region sequence-specific DNA binding; trophectodermal cell differentiation; angiogenesis; cartilage morphogenesis; negative regulation of transcription, DNA-templated; blastocyst development; positive regulation of transcription by RNA polymerase II
Sources:Amigo / QuickGO
Orthologs
Databases	NCBI: entry; OMA: entry
Species	Human	Mouse
Entrez	9421	15110
Ensembl	ENSG00000113196	ENSMUSG00000037335
UniProt	O96004	Q64279
RefSeq (mRNA)	NM_004821	NM_008213
RefSeq (protein)	NP_004812	NP_032239
Location (UCSC)	Chr 5: 154.47 – 154.48 Mb	Chr 11: 57.72 – 57.72 Mb
PubMed search
- Wikidata
View/Edit Human	View/Edit Mouse

Heart- and neural crest derivatives-expressed protein 1 is a protein that in humans is encoded by the HAND1 gene.

A member of the HAND subclass of basic Helix-loop-helix (bHLH) transcription factors, the Heart and neural crest-derived transcript-1 (HAND1) gene is vital for the development and differentiation of three distinct embryological lineages including the cardiac muscle cells of the heart, trophoblast of the placenta, and yolk sac vasculogenesis. Most highly related to twist-like bHLH genes in amino acid identity and embryonic expression, HAND1 can form homo- and heterodimer combinations with multiple bHLH partners, mediating transcriptional activity in the nucleus.

== Function ==
The protein encoded by this gene belongs to the basic helix-loop-helix family of transcription factors. This gene product is one of two closely related family members, the HAND proteins are expressed within the developing ventricular chambers, cardiac neural crest, endocardium (HAND2 only) and epicardium (HAND2 only). HAND1 is expressed with myocardium of the primary heart field and plays an essential but poorly understood role in cardiac morphogenesis.

HAND1 works jointly with HAND2 in cardiac development of embryos based on a crucial HAND gene dosage system. If HAND1 is over or under expressed then morphological abnormalities can form; most notable are cleft lips and palates. Expression was modeled with a knock-in of phosphorylation to turn on and off gene expression which induced the craniofacial abnormalities. Knock-out experimentation on mice caused death and severe cardiac malformations such as failed cardiac looping, impaired ventricular development and defective chamber septation. This aids in the implication that HAND1 expression is a factor to patients with congenital heart disease. However, a lack of HAND1 in the distal regions of the Neural Crest has no effect on cranial feature formation. Mutation of HAND1 has been shown to hinder the effect of GATA4, another vital cardiac transcription factor, and is associated with congenital heart disease. The lack of HAND1 detection in the developing embryo leads to many of the structural defects that causes heart disease and facial deformities while the dosage of HAND1 relates to the severity of these maladies.

HAND factors function in the formation of the right ventricle, left ventricle, aortic arch arteries, epicardium, and endocardium implicating them as mediators of congenital heart disease. In addition, HAND1 is uniquely expressed in trophoblasts and is essential for early trophoblast differentiation.

=== Cardiac morphogenesis ===
In the third week of fetal development the rudimentary heart (bilaterally symmetrical cardiac tube) undergoes a characteristic dextral looping, forming an asymmetrical structure with bulges that represent the incipient ventricular and atrial chambers of the heart. Arising from cells derived from the primary heart field in the cardiac crescent, HAND1 goes from being expressed on both sides of the heart tube to the ventral surface of the caudal heart segment and the aortic sac, then being restricted to the outer curvature of the left ventricle in the looped heart. In conjunction with HAND2 (a fellow bHLH transcription factor), complementary and overlapping expression patterns are thought to play a role in interpreting asymmetrical signals in the developing heart which leads to the characteristic looping. The two are implemented in cardiac development of embryos based on a crucial HAND gene dosage system. If HAND1 is over or under expressed then morphological abnormalities can form; most notable are cleft lips and palates. Expression was modeled with a knock-in of phosphorylation to turn on and off gene expression which induced the craniofacial abnormalities.

HAND1 mutants also appear to develop a spectrum of cardiac abnormalities, as demonstrated in knock-out experimentation in the mouse model, where HAND1-null mice displayed defects in the ventral septum, malformation of the AV valve, hypoplastic ventricles, and outflow tract abnormalities. In humans, evidence of a frameshift mutation in the bHLH domain of HAND1 has been correlated with hypoplastic left heart syndrome (a serious form of congenital heart disease where the left side of the heart is severely underdeveloped), aiding in the implication that HAND1 expression is a factor to patients with the disease.

However, a lack of HAND1 in the distal regions of the Neural Crest has no effect on cranial feature formation. Mutation of HAND1 has been shown to hinder the effect of GATA4, another vital cardiac transcription factor, and is associated with congenital heart disease. The lack of HAND1 detection in the developing embryo leads to many of the structural defects that causes heart disease and facial deformities while the dosage of HAND1 relates to the severity of these maladies.

=== Trophoblast differentiation ===
In addition, HAND1 is uniquely expressed in trophoblasts and is essential for early trophoblast giant cell differentiation. Trophoblast giant cells are necessary in order for placental development to proceed, participating in vital processes such as blastocyst implantation, remodeling of the maternal decidua, and secretion of hormones. The importance of this relationship is demonstrated in HAND1-null mutant mice, which display significant abnormalities in trophoblast development, such as a reduced ectoplacental cone, thin parietal yolk sac, and reduced density of trophoblast giant cells. These homozygous HAND1-null mutant embryos were arrested by E7.5 of gestation, though could be saved by contribution of wild-type cells to the trophoblast.

=== Yolk sac vasculogenesis ===
Expressed in high levels in the extraembryonic membranes throughout development, HAND1 also plays a functional role in vascular development of the yolk sac. Though not strictly required for vasculogenesis, data has shown that HAND1 contributes to the fine-tuning of the vasculogenic response in the yolk sac, recruiting smooth muscle cells to the endothelial network in order to refine the primitive endothelial plexus to a functional vascular system. This relationship has been demonstrated in the HAND1-null mouse model, where embryos lacking the HAND1 gene had a yolk sac vasculature defect caused by lack of vasculature refinement leading to the accumulation of hematopoietic cells between the yolk sac and the amnion.
