= Mr. Hand =

Mr. Hand or Mr. Hands may refer to:

== Music and literature ==
- Mr. Hands (album), a 1980 release by Herbie Hancock
- Mr. Hands, a 2007 novel by Gary A. Braunbeck

== Characters in fiction ==
- Israel Hands, character in the 1883 adventure novel Treasure Island by Robert Louis Stevenson
- Mr. Hands, character in the recurring Mr. Bill sketches on Saturday Night Live (1976-1981)
- Mr. Hand, history teacher in the 1982 film Fast Times at Ridgemont High and the 1986 television series Fast Times
- Mr. Hand, character in the 1998 tech noir film Dark City
- Mr. Hands, a character in the 2020 video game Cyberpunk 2077

== People ==
- Kenneth Pinyan, aka Mr. Hands, American man who died in the 2005 Enumclaw horse sex case

== See also ==
- Master Hand, video game character
- Hand (surname)
- Hands (surname)
- Mr. Hat, the hand puppet companion of Mr. Garrison on the animated television series South Park
