= Hendl =

Hendl is a surname. Notable people with the surname include:

- Bernhard Hendl (born 1992), Austrian football goalkeeper
- Susan Hendl (1947–2020), American ballet dancer and répétiteur
- Walter Hendl (1917–2007), American conductor, composer and pianist

== See also ==
- Roast chicken § Hendl
