= John P. Hand =

American judge

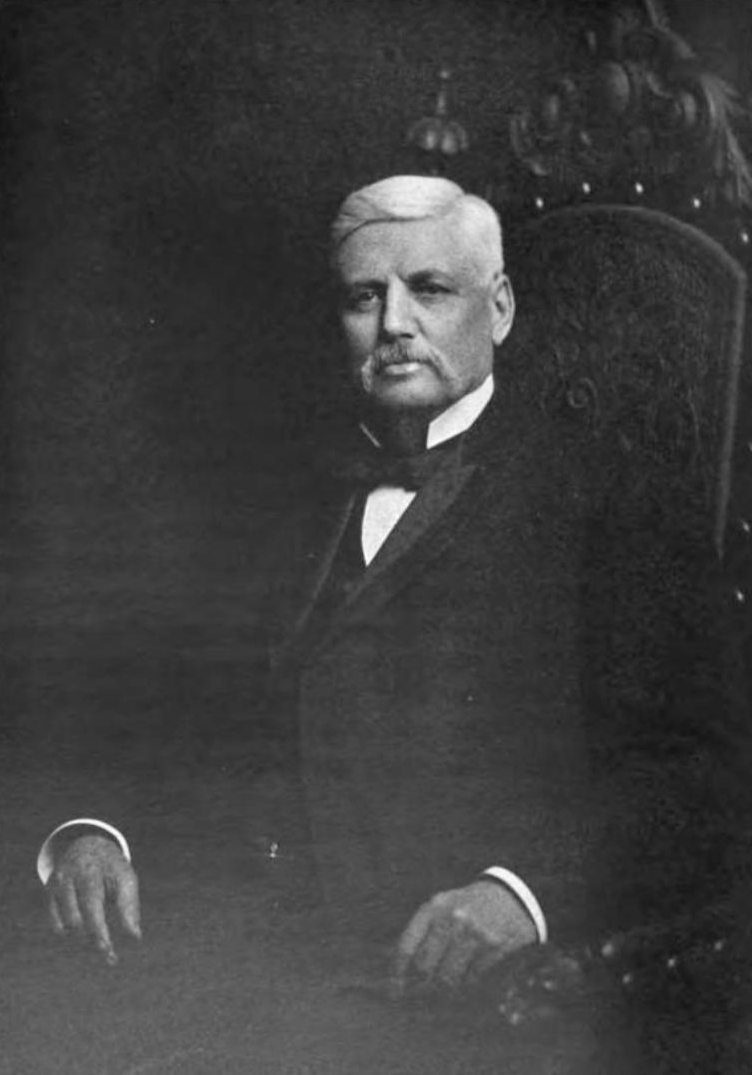
Hand in 1908

John Pryor Hand (November 10, 1850 – May 22, 1923) was an American jurist.

== Biography ==
John P. Hand was born in Henry County, Illinois on November 10, 1850. He studied at Rock River Seminary in Mount Morris, Illinois. In 1872, Hand received his bachelor's degree from University of Iowa. He was admitted to the Illinois bar in 1875 and practiced law in Cambridge, Illinois. Hand served as county judge for Henry County and then as assistant United States for the Northern Illinois District. From 1900 until his resignation in 1913, Hand served on the Illinois Supreme Court and was chief justice. Hand died in Cambridge, Illinois.
