= Pierre Robin =

Pierre Robin may refer to:

- Pierre Robin (designer), French aeroplane designer
- Pierre Robin (surgeon) (1867–1950), French surgeon
  - Pierre Robin syndrome, a congenital condition of facial abnormalities
- Pierre Robin (judoka), French judoka
