= Aglossia =

Congenital tongue disorder

Aglossia (aglossia congenita) is defined as the substantial loss of tongue. Instances of isolated aglossia (as in aglossia on its own without any other congenital limb defects) are exceedingly rare.

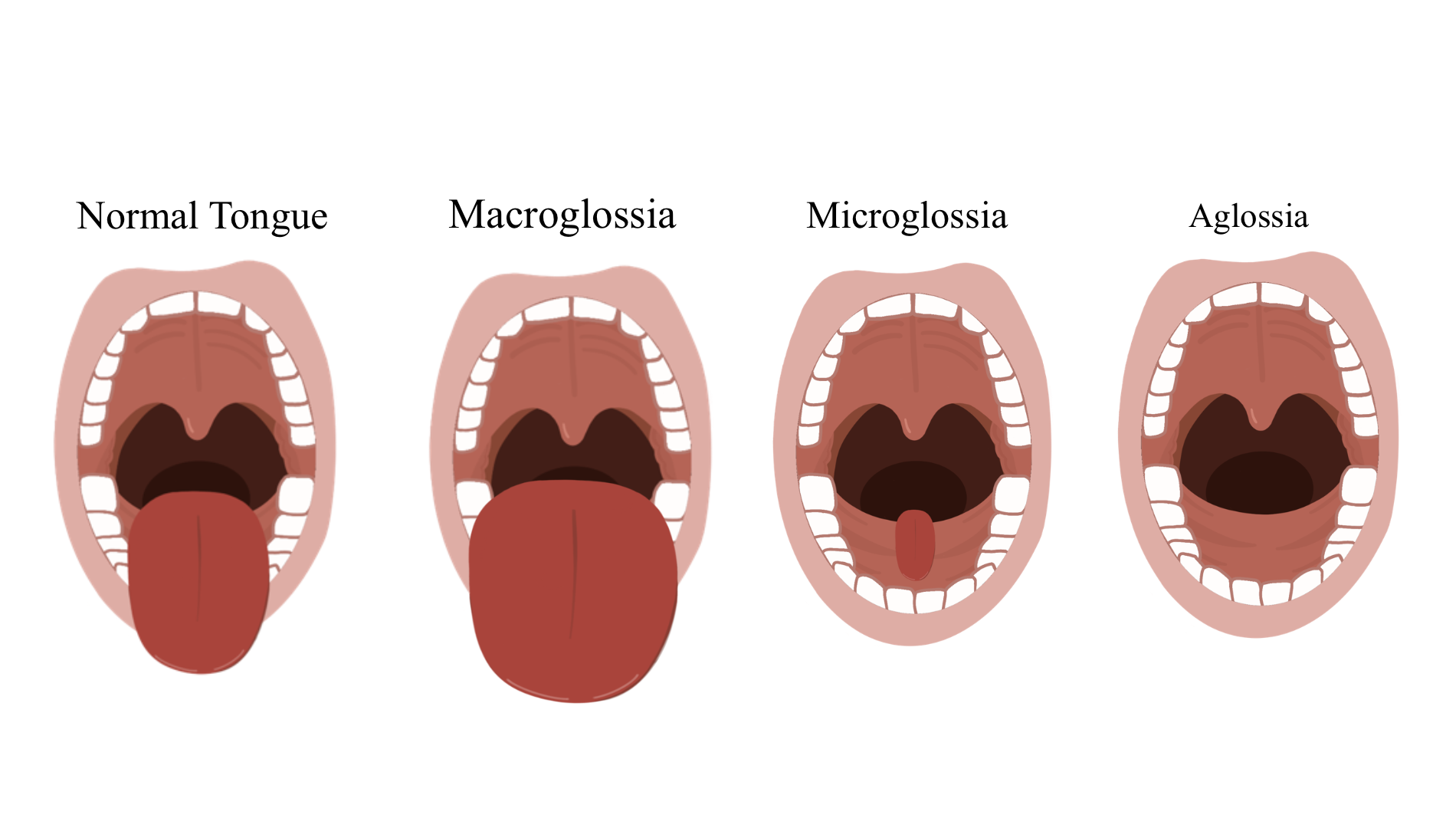
Visual depictions of conditions affecting tongue presence and size.

== Severity ==
Aglossia is the most severe form of tongue size defects. It is more severe than other related conditions like hypoglossia, microglossia, and macroglossia.

Unlike aglossia, individuals with hypoglossia/microglossia have a tongue, but the length and width of their tongue is shorter than average. Macroglossia, on the other hand, refers to tongues that are abnormally large.

== Associations with other conditions ==
Oftentimes, aglossia is associated with other congenital conditions. One example is aglossia-adactylia, characterized as aglossia with digital malformations.

Aglossia can also be associated with defects in other regions of the body, such as the cranium, face, mouth, teeth, cardiovascular system, central nervous system, as well as other internal organs.

Aglossia is also seen as a symptom of a broader set of oromandibular limb hypogenesis syndrome (OLHS) conditions, such as Moebius syndrome and Hanhart syndrome. There is little to no information on the frequency of aglossia seen with OLHS, as most information regarding aglossia is given through case studies.

== Frequency ==
From 1718 to the mid-1980s there was a total of 7 reported congenital aglossia cases worldwide. In 2015, this increased to 9 cases, and by 2017, there was a total of 11 reported cases.

According McMicken et al.'s 2019 report, there are now 13 documented cases of congenital aglossia worldwide.

== First reported description ==
In 1718 Antoine de Jussieu, a French botanist and physician, first described aglossia in his report titled, "Observation sur la manière dont une fille née sans langue s'acquitte des fonctions qui dépendent de cet organe". De Jussieu's report can be found in the book The Tongue Not Essential to Speech: With Illustrations of the Power of Speech in the African Confessors by Edward Twisleton (1873). De Jussieu's report, on a 15 year old Portuguese girl, described how she was able to function without her tongue. In his report, he also provided an in-depth description of the girl's anatomy, a notable finding being that she still had some tongue muscles even when she had no tongue.

His report also included an assessment on how well the girl could perform the 5 functions that require the tongue: speaking, tasting, mastication (chewing), deglutition (swallowing), and spitting. He wrote about her speech, stating that she had trouble with pronouncing certain letters, such as C, F, G, L, N, R, S, T, X and Z. In order to pronounce these letters, she had to reposition her chin.

According to de Jussieu, the most challenging function for the girl was mastication. In order to effectively chew her food, she had to either use her fingers or reposition her lower jaw. De Jussieu wrote that she used her fingers to aid in the deglutition process.

== Pathophysiology ==
The presentation of aglossia is usually with a secondary congenital condition or additional malformations within the body, where these malformations are not constricted to one region.

=== Craniofacial abnormalities ===
There have been reports of individuals with aglossia that have had craniofacial abnormalities such as microcephaly, facial asymmetry, jaw asymmetry, micrognathia (where the lower jaw is smaller than normal), absence of mandibular rami (a portion of the lower jaw), agenesis of lower lip, as well as forms of cleft lip.

=== Oral abnormalities ===
Most often, patients with aglossia present with oral and dental abnormalities. These include but are not limited to: anodontia/hypodontia (complete/partial absence of teeth), bony/cartilaginous fusion of jaws, cleft palate, and synechia (a congenital condition in which two areas of the mouth are abnormally joined by a band of tissue). Specifically, synechia in aglossia patients involves the fusion of the alveolar mucosa with the labial mucosa, as well as an abnormally large uvula (which is referred to as hypertrophic).

=== Limb defects ===
As aglossia is associated with aglossia-adactylia, there can also be the presentation of aglossia alongside major limb defects. Particularly, these are: distal to humerus upper limb defects, distal to femur lower limb defects, bony fusion of phalanges, hemimelia (congenital absence of parts of lower limbs), and peromelia (congenital absence of parts of upper limbs).

=== Cardiovascular defects & structural malformations ===
There have been some severe cardiovascular system defects associated with aglossia. For instance, some of these defects were: ventricular septal defects (a hole in the heart), dextrocardia (incorrect placement of the heart on the wrong side of the chest), ischemic heart disease (damage to the heart as a result of narrowed heart arteries), and hypertension (high blood pressure).

Pulmonary hypoplasia (a congenital disorder of the respiratory system) has also been reported and can be associated with congenital heart diseases.

Some individuals with aglossia may also have pectus excavatum (chest deformity where the breastbone is abnormally shaped such that the chest is caved inward).

=== Defects within the central nervous system ===
In extremely rare cases, there have been reports of aglossia in individuals who have severe intellectual disabilities.

=== Visceral organ defects ===
Some individuals with aglossia have also presented with several defects within their visceral organs. Some of these defects reported were: situs inversus totalis (incorrect 'mirrored' positions of internal organs), jejunal atresia (incorrect formation of the small intestine), esophageal atresia (where the esophagus is not connected to the stomach), hypoplastic epiglottis (an epiglottis that is underdeveloped), gastrochisis (visible intestines), choanal atresia/stenosis (blocked or narrow nasal passages).

== Causes ==
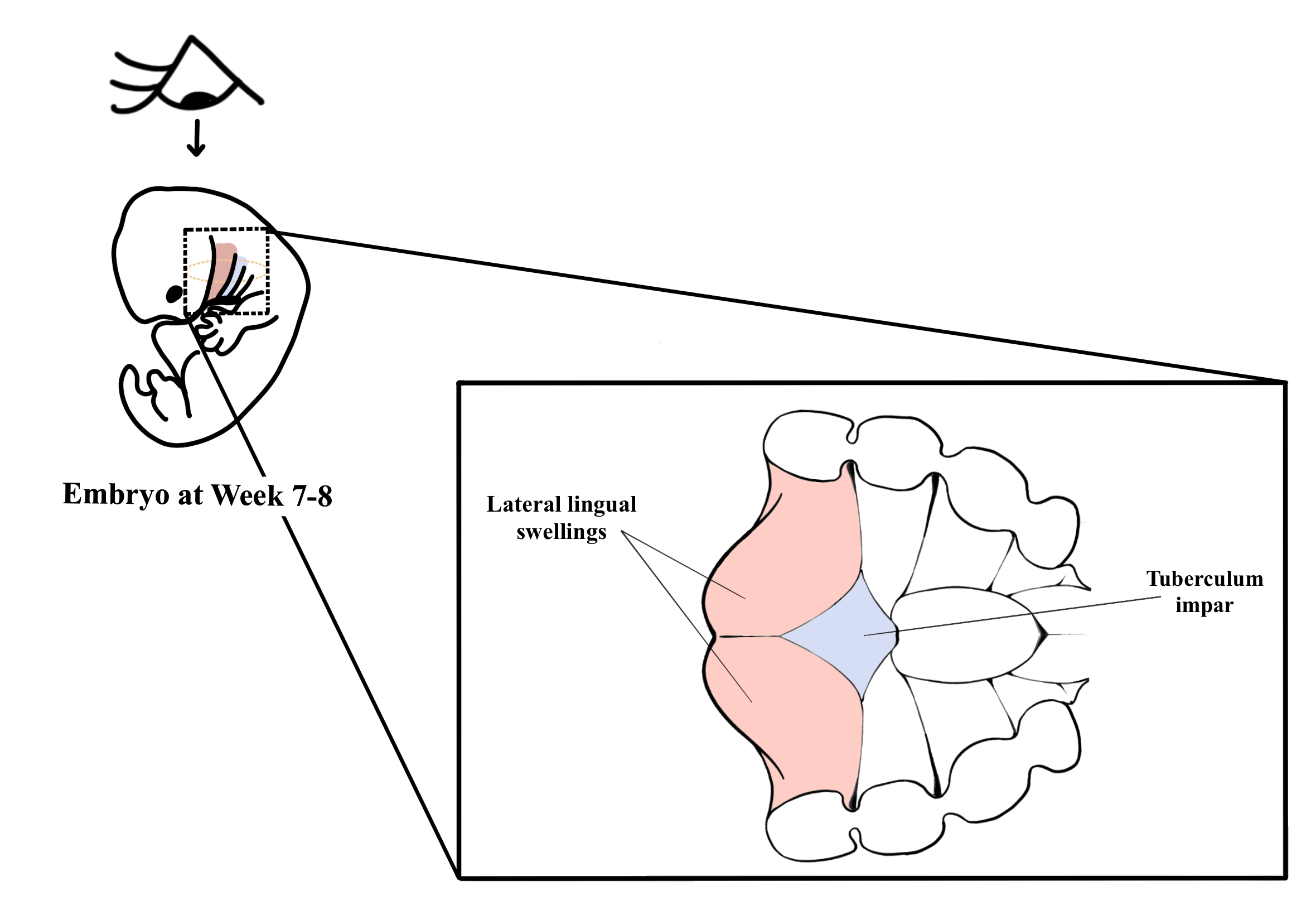
The two lateral lingual swellings grow and merge over the tuberculum impar to form the anterior two-thirds of an adult tongue.

=== Developmental ===
The exact developmental cause of aglossia remains largely unknown. However, it is speculated that the condition is associated with issues pertaining to palatal and facial development, which occur during weeks 4-8 of embryogenesis. Aglossia is thought to be the result of improper development of the early tongue structures: the two lateral lingual swellings and the tuberculum impar. Individuals who have partial aglossia (meaning they still have some tongue structures) tend to be missing the anterior section of their tongue, as opposed to the posterior section.

== Research ==
=== Regulatory mechanisms ===
The biological regulatory mechanisms responsible for aglossia development are not well understood. However, research on the genetic origins of aglossia in mice may help understand how it impacts humans.

One study, which looked at jaw development in mice embryos, inferred that the transcription factor Hand2, helped to specify part of the distal mandibular arch which plays a role in forming the lower jaw and initiating development of the tongue mesenchyme.

It is believed that role of Hand2 within this process was to act via a negative feedback loop to repress genes Dlx5 and Dlx6. In keeping with the negative feedback loop mechanism, Dlx5 and Dlx6 would first activate Hand2 in the distal arch ectomesenchyme region in the embryo, and then would be effectively silenced by Hand2.

Barron et al. found that in the absence of Hand2, Dlx5 and Dlx6 would remain unrepressed, which would then trigger the overexpression of the Runx2 gene in the lower jaw (mandibular arch). Overexpression of Runx2 was found to lead to malformations across the lower jaw region, alongside incorrect bone placement due to incorrect proximal-distal patterning within that region. It was found that in mice, this resulted in aglossia, as tongue development did not occur. More work and research within this area has to be done in order to determine if this mechanism is related to the development of aglossia within humans.

=== Environmental factors ===
Mouse studies have also shown how a folic acid deficiency could influence the development of aglossia.

A study conducted by Maldonado et al. looked at the effects of folic acid deficiency on mice development. They found that a folic acid deficiency was associated with congenital tongue malformations. They performed an experiment where they fed 8 week old female mice a folic acid deficient diet for variable periods of time (anywhere between 2–16 weeks) through pregnancy. The researchers found that feeding pregnant mice a folic acid deficient diet for more than 8 weeks was sufficient to increase the proportion of offspring born with tongue malformations. However, the researchers also noted that a 6-week folic acid deficient diet was sufficient to reduce the progeny's tongue width.

From their study, 23 malformed fetuses were born. 69.6% of them had aglossia and the remaining 30.4% had microglossia. There were three major anatomical differences found between mice with aglossia and mice with microglossia. These differences included how their tongue muscles were organized, the composition of their lower jaw, and whether they had a lingual septum.

In terms of tongue organization, mice with microglossia had some discernible, albeit, highly disorganized tongue muscles and mice with aglossia had no discernible tongue muscles. In terms of lower jaw composition, 75% of the mice with aglossia had agnathia (complete absence of the lower jaw) while 25% of the mice with aglossia had micrognathia (a lower jaw which is smaller than normal). All mice that had microglossia also had micrognathia. Regarding the presence of a lingual septum, mice with aglossia did not have a lingual septum. Mice with microglossia did have a lingual septum, however, it was poorly defined and nearly nonexistent.

These findings from Maldonado and colleagues showed that tongue malformations such as microglossia and aglossia could arise from a maternal folic acid deficiency in pregnancy. While this has not been studied in humans, Maldonado et al. recommended based on their results that that the tongue should be recognized as an organ sensitive to folic acid related birth defects.

== Case studies ==
Since aglossia is an extremely rare condition, most available information comes from individual case reports published in journals. Several case studies have been published describing clinical presentations of the condition, alongside associated treatments and management strategies.

=== Case 1: Brazilian female ===
This case study documents the presentation and treatments performed on a 14 year old Brazilian girl with aglossia. This case also gives information on how she was able to speak and perform some of the 5 ordinary functions of the tongue, that de Jussieu outlined, in the absence of a tongue. This case study documents her growth and treatment over the span of 9 years, as she first presented to the clinic in 1996, at the age of 5.

One of the challenges with her condition was that she experienced difficulties chewing her food, due to pain when her teeth contacted the roof of her mouth. This was largely due to her anatomy, her jaw was smaller than normal, and as a consequence, her mandibular incisors (the front four teeth in the lower jaw) did not develop. She also had a uvula which was enlarged (hypertrophic). Furthermore, she had no transverse alveolar arch development, as that region required muscular stimulation (from the tongue) in order to develop. As a result of her complicated anatomy she also experienced several significant dental issues.

To compensate for her lack of tongue and be able to speak and swallow, she could raise the posterior portion of the floor of her mouth so that it could reach her palate. Compared to the average person, her ability to taste saltier and acidic foods was more pronounced. On the contrary, she could not taste sweeter and bitter foods as well, and tended to confuse the two. This finding was not found to be the case in de Jussieu's report, and was one of the more unique features of this case.

Regarding her speech, the patient had a speech impediment; she was able to pronounce most phonemes, however there were a few she struggled with. These included ones that required specific tongue placements, such as /t/, /d/, /n/, /s/, /z/, /š/, /ž/. She could not pronounce the phonemes /l/ and /r/. After six years of speech therapy, she was better able to pronounce the phonemes /s/ and /z/, but still had difficulties correctly articulating /š/ and /ž/.

As for her dental treatment, a distraction osteogenesis via a symphyseal osteotomy was performed. A symphyseal osteotomy involves the repositioning/cutting of the lower jaw. Following this, a customized distractor (a device used to create gaps between 2 bone segments in order to foster new bone growth within the gap) using a rapid prototyping model was then placed in her mouth. As a result of this treatment, she experienced new bone growth.

In 2013, her case and subsequent treatment was presented at a Brazilian symposium on isolated congenital aglossia.

=== Case 2: Egyptian male ===
A 21 year old Egyptian male was found to have aglossia upon examination at a dental clinic in Egypt, where his primary concern was not that he had aglossia, rather, that he might have acute pulpitis (inflammation of inner tooth tissue). Anatomically, this patient had no additional defects to his face. However, his alveolar ridge did not develop properly, and was too small. As a result, he had numerous malocclusions (where his teeth did not fit together properly) across his lower jaw.

This case study also provided a description of the patient's symptoms as well the impact aglossia had on him, using the five main functions of the tongue assessment outlined by de Jussieu. In this case, the patient did not have any issues with speech or swallowing, but, some of his pronunciations were slightly off. Doctors commented on how the floor of his mouth was able to fulfill the role of the tongue, allowing him to speak and swallow with relative ease. There were no documented or recommended treatments, per the patient's wishes.

=== Case 3: 5-year-old female ===
A 5-year-old female from Australia presented with congenital aglossia accompanied by significant orofacial anomalies and early-life complications. Immediately after birth, she required respiratory support and immediate resuscitation due to oxygen deficiency. Doctors found excess pharyngeal tissue (the tissues that form the throat), which created an obstruction to her airways. This was removed via a surgical cut to create an airway (tracheotomy) to prevent additional complications. After that, a tracheostomy tube was placed. She had difficulty swallowing and was unable to be fed orally and was therefore fed via a gastrostomy tube.

Anatomically, she had a small jaw (severe micrognathia) and her jaw was positioned too far back in her mouth, and as a result, she had a severe overbite (class II malocclusion). Additionally, the opening to her throat and her jawbones was unusually narrow.

She also had a speech delay, however, she was eventually able to speak by moving her lower lips and jaw. This acted as a compensatory mechanism in place of her tongue. Her recommended treatment included both speech therapy and a mandibular symphysis.

Speech therapy helped her pronounce most vowels, with the exception of /i/ and /oi/. Following speech therapy, she was also able to produce the consonants /h/, /w/, /m/, /p/, and /b/. However, she still had difficulty articulating and pronouncing /f/, and the consonants /n/, /l/, and /t/ as they all required specific tongue placements.

== Notable individuals with aglossia ==
The documentation of Kelly Rogers' case in 1986 allowed for significant advancements in both the scientific and medical fields. The lessons learned from Kelly's case allowed surgeons to better reconstruct a more functional version of the oral cavity in individuals who had to undergo surgery (regardless of whether they had aglossia or not).

Kelly Rogers was born with congenital aglossia in 1969. In 1986, she was intensely studied by Betty McMicken, a clinical assistant professor in the Department of Otolaryngology at the University of California, Irvine.

A unique feature of Kelly's case was that she had no speech or swallowing impediments. Remarkably, 80% of Kelly's speech was understandable. She was able to pronounce the letters t and d with ease, as well as the sounds /ta/ ("ta"), /ti/ ("tee"), /da/ ("da"), /di/ ("dee") even though all these sounds required usage of the tongue, a finding that puzzled doctors and scientists.

It was strongly recommended by doctors and scientists that Kelly did not undergo any interventions or surgery for her condition.

After 1986, there were no reported studies with Kelly until 2012. As of 2012, Kelly became a co-author and co-researcher on congenital aglossia with McMicken. In January 2013, Kelly's case was presented at an isolated congenital aglossia symposium in Brazil.

Researchers at the University of Southern California (USC) were finally able to uncover how Kelly was able to make the t and d sounds in 2015. They established that Kelly made additional lower lip movements, which allowed her to be able to speak and pronounce most words accurately.
