= Agenesis =

Failure of an organ to develop during embryonic growth

- Specialty: Medical genetics

In medicine, agenesis (/eɪˈdʒɛnəsəs/) is the failure of an organ to develop during embryonic growth and development due to the absence of primordial tissue. Many forms of agenesis are referred to by individual names, depending on the organ affected:

- Agenesis of the corpus callosum – failure in the development of the band of fibers connecting the cerebral hemispheres
- Renal agenesis – failure of one or both of the kidneys to develop
- Amelia – failure of the arms or legs to develop
- Penile agenesis – failure of penis to develop
- Müllerian agenesis – failure of the uterus and part of the vagina to develop
- Agenesis of the gallbladder – failure of the Gallbladder to develop. A person may not realize they have this condition unless they undergo surgery or medical imaging, since the gallbladder is neither externally visible nor essential.

== Eye agenesis ==
Eye agenesis is a medical condition in which people are born with no eyes.

== Dental and oral agenesis ==
- Anodontia, absence of all primary or permanent teeth.
- Aglossia, absence of the tongue.
- Agnathia, absence of the jaw.
- Wisdom tooth agenesis – most adult humans have three molars (on each upper/lower left/right side), with the third being referred to as the wisdom tooth. But many people have less than the four total. Agenesis of wisdom teeth is a normal condition that can differ widely by population, ranging from practically zero in Tasmanian Aborigines to nearly 100% in indigenous Mexicans. (See research paper with world map showing prevalence.)

== Ear agenesis ==
Ear agenesis is a medical condition in which people are born without ears.

Because the middle and inner ears are necessary for hearing, people with complete agenesis of the ears are totally deaf. Minor agenesis that affects only the visible parts of the outer ear, which may be called microtia, typically produces cosmetic concerns and perhaps hearing impairment if the opening to the ear canal is blocked, but not deafness.
