= Pierre Robin sequence-faciodigital anomaly syndrome =

- Other names: Chitayat Meunier Hodgkinson syndrome
- Specialty: Medical genetics
- Symptoms: Pierre robin Sequence with facio-digital abnormalities
- Complications: Usually, none
- Usual onset: Birth
- Duration: Lifelong
- Causes: Genetic mutation
- Risk factors: Being of French Canadian descent
- Prevention: None
- Prognosis: Good
- Frequency: very rare, only two cases have been described in medical literature
- Deaths: -

Pierre Robin sequence-faciodigital anomaly syndrome, also known as Chitayat Meunier Hodgkinson syndrome, is a very rare genetic disorder which is characterized by the signs typical of Pierre Robin sequence along with facial dysmorphisms and digital anomalies. Intellect is not affected. It is thought to be inherited in an X-linked recessive manner.

== Signs and symptoms ==
This list comprises all the symptoms people with this disorder exhibit:

- Retrognathism (belonging to Pierre Robin sequence)
- Glossoptosis (belonging to Pierre Robin sequence)
- Cleft palate (belonging to Pierre Robin sequence)
- High forehead
- Tapering fingers
- Hyperconvex digital nails
- Fifth finger clinodactyly
- Distal brachyphalangy
- Triphalangeal thumb
- First metacarpophalangeal joints which subluxate easily

== Epidemiology ==
Only 2 cases have been described in medical literature: two half-brothers from Quebec, Canada who shared the same mother, these brothers suffered from the symptoms mentioned above. The mother only had mild hyperopia. The fathers and the mother weren't related and both the mother and the children were of French-Canadian descent.
