= Pierre Robin (surgeon) =

French dental surgeon who first described Pierre Robin sequence

- Born: Pierre Robin; 1866
- Died: 1950 (aged 83–84)
- Known for: Pierre Robin sequence
- Medical career
- Profession: stomatologist, dental surgeon

Pierre Robin (French: [pjɛʁ ʁɔbɛ̃]; 1866–1950) was a French stomatologist (dental surgeon) from Paris. He was professor at the French School of Stomatology, and from 1914, he was editor-in-chief of the Revue de Stomatologie.

In a series of articles, beginning in 1923, Robin described the combined condition of underdevelopment of the mandible and retraction of the tongue. His first papers described clinical observations in young adults who had small jaws, and who also had upper airway obstruction during sleep. Robin proposed a novel idea of holding the lower jaw forward and mouth open, through the use of special dental splints; and specifically with an invented and novel device he later called the "Monobloc". This invention predated the eventual development of mandibular advancement splints used by dentists in sleep medicine today.

In a series of articles, Robin demonstrated that in adults, small mandibles lead to a series of both local dental and malocclusion effects, as well as wider systemic medical problems, including the development of what came to be known as Obstructive Sleep Apnoea.

In newborns, and young children he pioneered the understanding of the effects of small jaws as beginning from birth, and how the condition of glossoptosis may also lead to spontaneous or unexpected infant fatality during sleep, or what is now considered as cot death or Sudden Infant Death Syndrome. He is credited with recognizing that lying at-risk babies on their backs potentiated upper airway obstruction – by choking on the "fallen tongue" and his advice of prone (tummy lying) sleeping and feeding techniques were widely adopted in France and internationally at the time.

Later in the 1960s, authors writing in British Oral Surgery journals, and in particular David Poswillo, a New Zealand Oral & Maxillofacial Surgeon and UK based teratologist, postulated that the combination of am extremely small mandible, and oligohydramnios during late pregnancy, combined to produce a particularly unique form of non-formation of the palatal shelf – a condition distinct from other more usual forms of cleft palate.

In honor of Pierre Robin, who had also seen and first described this rare type of cleft in neonates with extremely small lower jaws, Poswillo proposed the term Pierre Robin sequence as posthumously named after him. This rare cleft condition is separated from the eponymous term Pierre Robin Syndrome, which Robin had at first termed "Le Grand Syndromie du Glossoptosis", and that was originally meant to describe the simple combined local and systemic effects of mandibular hypoplasia innately associated with glossoptosis. Distinct to "Pierre Robin Sequence", which now specifically references the rare palatal cleft condition, and occurs in about 1:80,000 live births, Robin postulated that the most obvious and ubiquitously linked association of glossoptosis, being the small lower jaw, had a natural frequency of a minimum of 40% of the adult Paris population of the time.

In the popular description, and more specifically used in maxillofacial surgery, the term "Pierre Robin" or "Pierre Robin mandible" is informally used to describe a very small lower jaw in both infants and adults. More typically, the condition of "Pierre Robin Syndrome" as used by Medicare Australia must satisfy that the patient has 1. Mandibular hypoplasia, 2. Glossoptosis and 3. With or without an associated palatal cleft.

Rue Pierre Robin in Lyon, France, is also named for him.
