= Micrognathism =

Condition in which the jaw is small

- Other names: Micrognathia, strawberry chin, hypognathia hypognathism
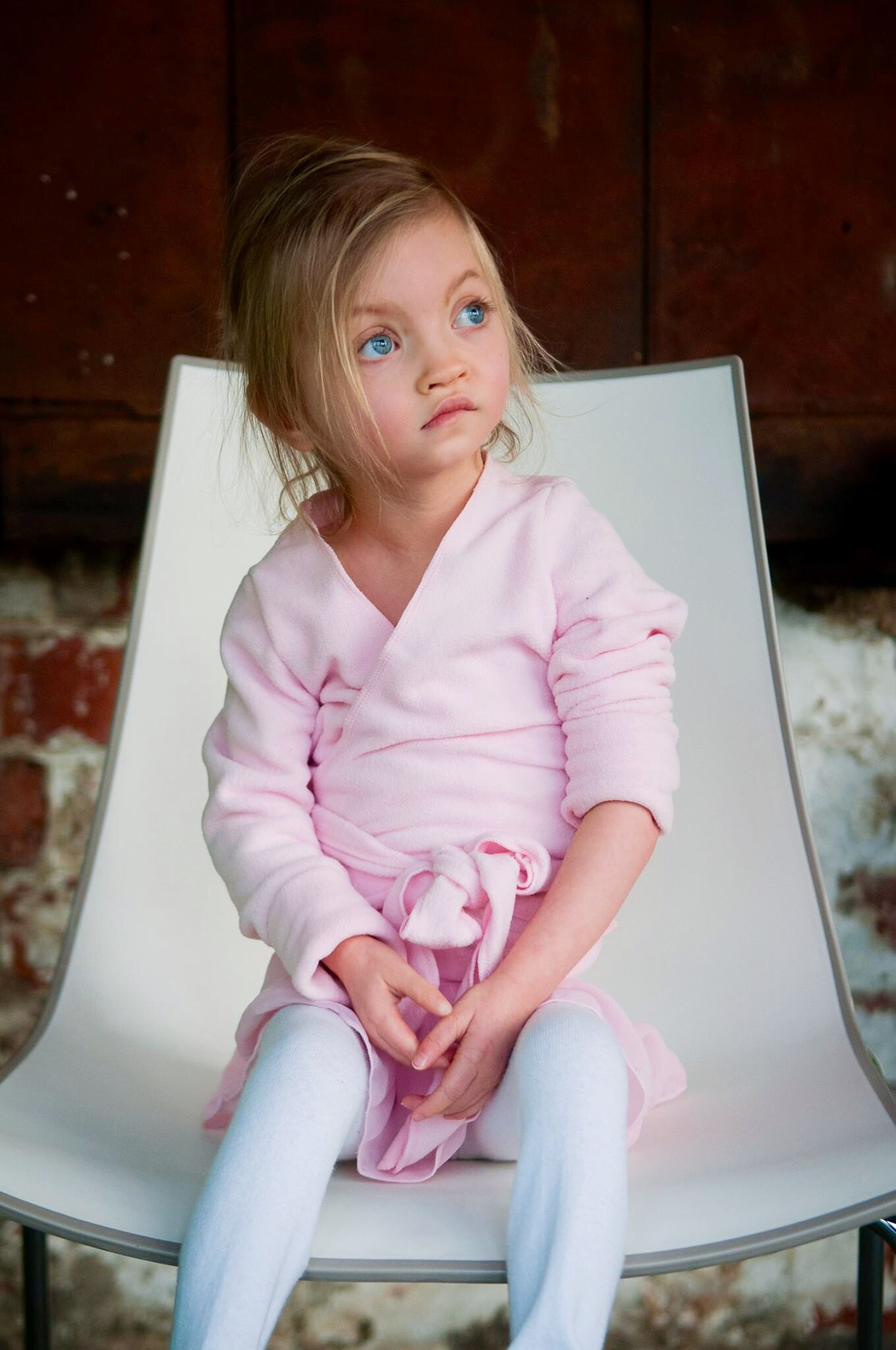
- Girl with Wolf–Hirschhorn syndrome
- Specialty: Medical genetics

Micrognathism is a condition where the jaw is undersized. It is also sometimes called mandibular hypoplasia. It is common in infants, but is usually self-corrected during growth, due to the jaws increasing in size. It may be a cause of abnormal tooth alignment and in severe cases can hamper feeding. It can also, both in adults and children, make intubation difficult, either during anesthesia or in emergency situations.

== Causes ==
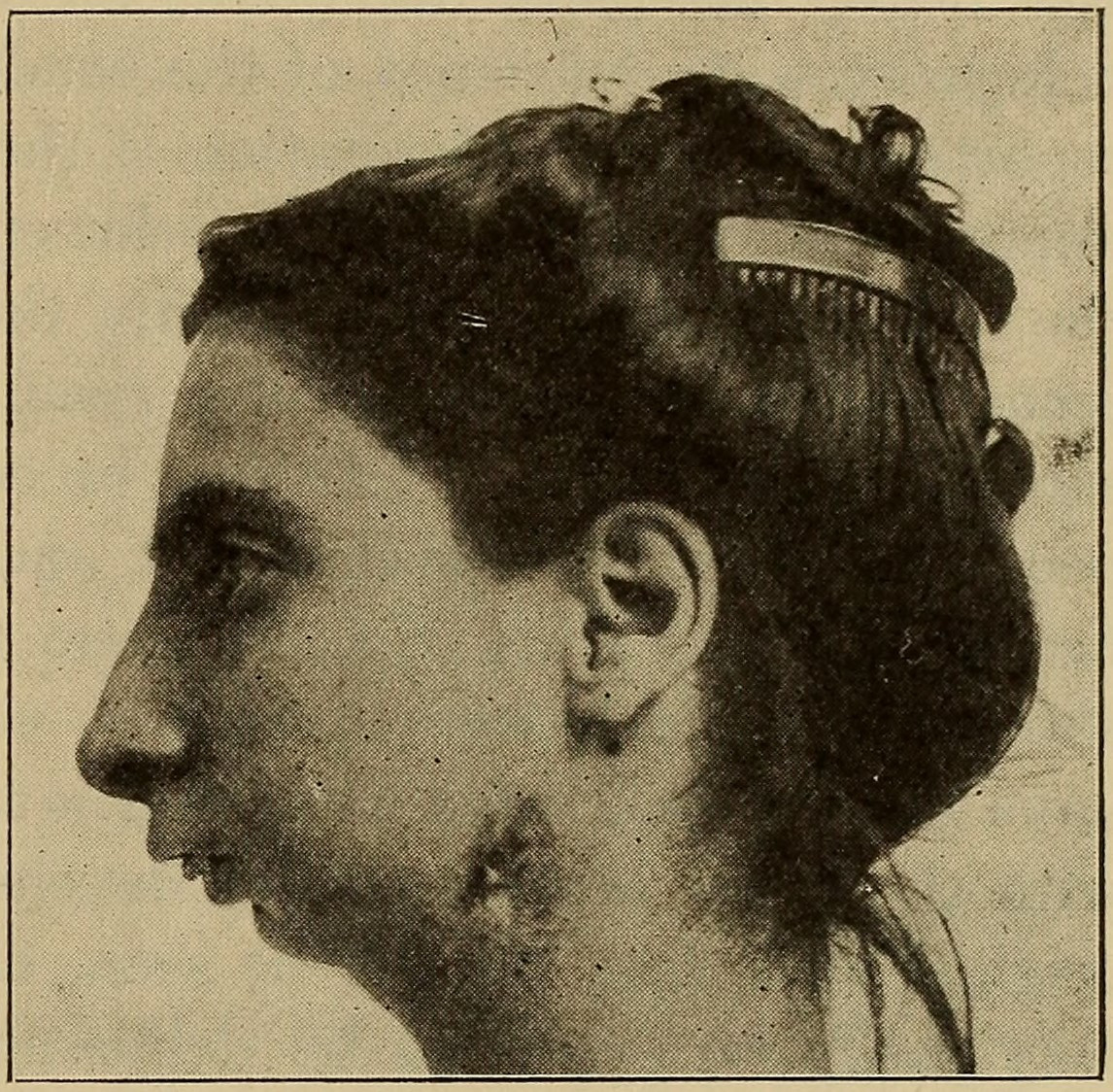
Severe micrognathia in a 23-year-old

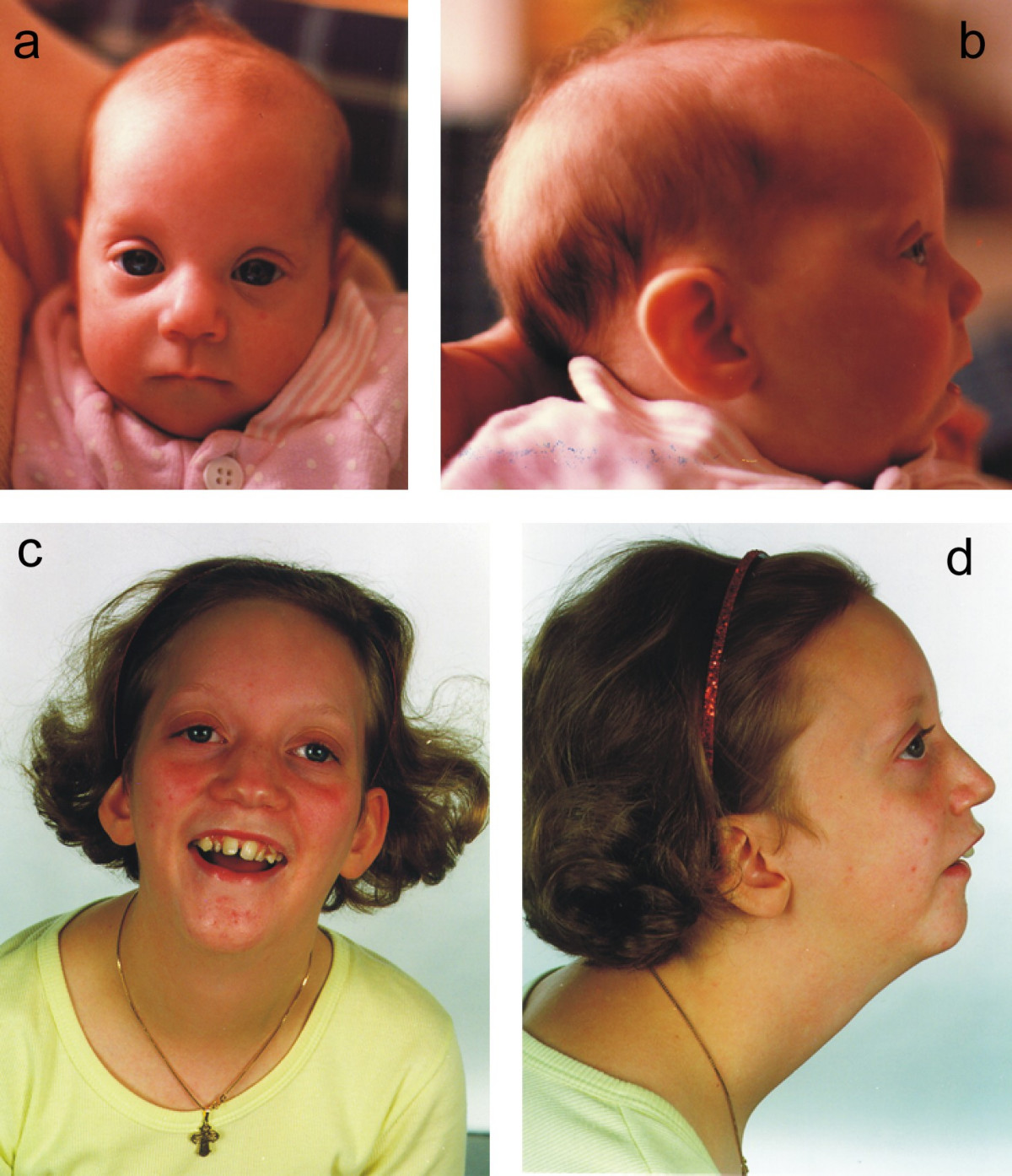
Micrognathia in Pitt–Rogers–Danks Syndrome (PRDS)

According to the NCBI, the following conditions feature micrognathism:

- 11q partial monosomy syndrome
- 3-methylglutaconic aciduria, type VIIB
- 46,XY sex reversal 4
- 4p partial monosomy syndrome
- Achard syndrome
- Acrofacial dysostosis Cincinnati type
- Acrofacial dysostosis Rodriguez type
- Acrofacial dysostosis, Catania type
- Acromegaloid facial appearance syndrome
- Adams–Oliver syndrome 2
- Agnathia-otocephaly complex
- ALG1-congenital disorder of glycosylation
- Alveolar capillary dysplasia with pulmonary venous misalignment
- Amish lethal microcephaly
- Andersen–Tawil syndrome
- Aprosencephaly cerebellar dysgenesis
- Arterial tortuosity syndrome
- Arthrogryposis multiplex congenita 1, neurogenic, with myelin defect
- Arthrogryposis multiplex congenita 4, neurogenic, with agenesis of the corpus callosum
- Arthrogryposis multiplex congenita 5
- Arthrogryposis, distal, type 2E
- Autism spectrum disorder due to AUTS2 deficiency
- Autosomal dominant Robinow syndrome 1–3
- Autosomal recessive multiple pterygium syndrome
- Autosomal recessive osteopetrosis 5
- Autosomal recessive Robinow syndrome
- Autosomal recessive spastic paraplegia type 70
- Bailey-Bloch congenital myopathy
- Baller–Gerold syndrome
- Barber–Say syndrome
- Bartsocas–Papas syndrome 1 and 2
- Bohring–Opitz syndrome
- Bowen–Conradi syndrome
- C syndrome
- Camptomelic dysplasia
- Cardiofaciocutaneous syndrome
- Cat eye syndrome
- Catel–Manzke syndrome
- Cerebro-costo-mandibular syndrome
- Cerebrooculofacioskeletal syndrome 1–4
- CHARGE association
- Chondrodysplasia Blomstrand type
- Chondrodysplasia with joint dislocations, gPAPP type
- Cleidocranial dysostosis
- Coffin–Siris syndrome 6 and 12
- COG1 congenital disorder of glycosylation
- COG7 congenital disorder of glycosylation
- COG8-congenital disorder of glycosylation
- Cohen syndrome
- Cold-induced sweating syndrome 1
- Cole–Carpenter syndrome 1
- Complex lethal osteochondrodysplasia
- Congenital contractural arachnodactyly
- Congenital disorder of glycosylation type 1E
- Congenital disorder of glycosylation, type IIr
- Congenital disorder of glycosylation, type IIw
- Congenital lactic acidosis, Saguenay-Lac-Saint-Jean type
- Congenital myasthenic syndrome 19
- Congenital myopathy 20
- Congenital myopathy 22A, classic
- Congenital myopathy 22B, severe fetal
- Cornelia de Lange syndrome 1, 3, and 5
- Costello syndrome
- Cowden syndrome 5 and 6
- Cranioectodermal dysplasia 2 and 3
- Craniofacial microsomia
- Cutis laxa, autosomal recessive, type 1B
- D-2-hydroxyglutaric aciduria 1
- Desmosterolosis
- Developmental and epileptic encephalopathy 64, 77, 80, and 100
- Diamond–Blackfan anemia 1, 6, 10, 14 (with mandibulofacial dysostosis), 15 (with mandibulofacial dysostosis), 21
- Diaphragmatic hernia 4, with cardiovascular defects
- Diarrhea 10, protein-losing enteropathy type
- DiGeorge syndrome
- Distal arthrogryposis types 2B1 and 5D
- DPAGT1-congenital disorder of glycosylation
- Dubowitz syndrome
- Dysosteosclerosis
- Ehlers–Danlos syndrome, classic-like, 2
- Ehlers–Danlos syndrome, dermatosparaxis type
- Ehlers–Danlos syndrome, spondylodysplastic type, 1
- Emanuel syndrome
- Epilepsy, X-linked 2, with or without impaired intellectual development and dysmorphic features
- Fanconi anemia complementation groups L and P
- Faundes–Banka syndrome
- Feingold syndrome type 1
- FG syndrome 1
- Fibrochondrogenesis 2
- Fibromuscular dysplasia, multifocal
- Fontaine progeroid syndrome
- Frank–Ter Haar syndrome
- Fraser syndrome 3
- Galloway–Mowat syndrome 1, 2 (X-linked), 3, and 7
- GAPO syndrome
- Gaucher disease perinatal lethal
- Genitopatellar syndrome
- Gordon syndrome
- Granulocytopenia with immunoglobulin abnormality
- Greenberg dysplasia
- Hajdu–Cheney syndrome
- Hallermann–Streiff syndrome
- Hamartoma of hypothalamus
- Hereditary spastic paraplegia 23
- Holoprosencephaly 13, X-linked

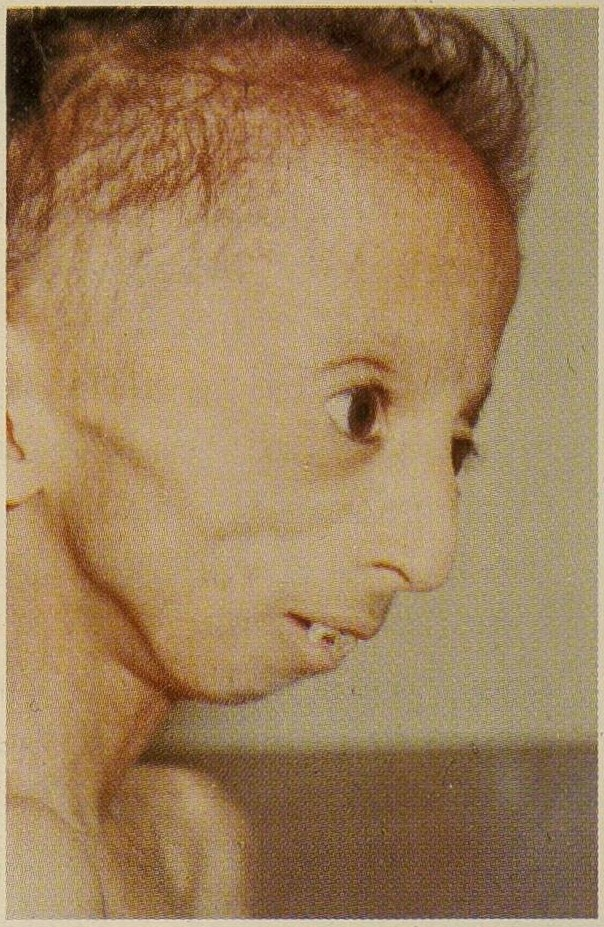
Micrognathism in Hutchinson–Gilford syndrome

- Hutchinson–Gilford syndrome
- Hydrolethalus syndrome 1 and 2
- Immunodeficiency 49
- Immunodeficiency–centromeric instability–facial anomalies syndrome 1
- Infantile neuroaxonal dystrophy
- Infantile-onset X-linked spinal muscular atrophy
- Intellectual developmental disorder, autosomal dominant 64, 65, and 70
- Intellectual disability, autosomal dominant 1
- Intellectual disability, X-linked 61
- Intellectual disability, X-linked syndromic, Turner type
- Intellectual disability, X-linked, syndromic, Bain type
- Isolated cleft palate
- Isolated congenital hypoglossia/aglossia
- Isolated Pierre Robin syndrome
- Isotretinoin-like syndrome
- Kabuki syndrome
- Keppen–Lubinsky syndrome
- Knobloch syndrome 2
- Langer–Giedion syndrome
- Larsen-like syndrome, B3GAT3 type
- Lateral meningocele syndrome
- Legius syndrome
- Lethal congenital contracture syndrome 1, 2, 7, and 9
- Lethal Kniest-like syndrome
- Lethal multiple pterygium syndrome
- Lissencephaly 7 with cerebellar hypoplasia
- Liver disease, severe congenital
- Loeys–Dietz syndrome 1 and 2
- Lymphatic malformation 6
- Mandibuloacral dysplasia progeroid syndrome
- Mandibuloacral dysplasia with type A lipodystrophy
- Mandibuloacral dysplasia with type B lipodystrophy
- Mandibulofacial dysostosis with alopecia
- Mandibulofacial dysostosis-microcephaly syndrome
- Marbach-Rustad progeroid syndrome
- Marden–Walker syndrome
- Marfan syndrome
- Marshall syndrome
- Matthew–Wood syndrome
- Mayer–Rokitansky–Küster–Hauser syndrome type 2
- Meckel syndrome 13 and 14
- Meckel syndrome, type 1
- Megalocornea-intellectual disability syndrome
- Meier-Gorlin syndrome
- Melnick–Needles syndrome
- Menke-Hennekam syndrome 1 and 2
- Microcephalic osteodysplastic primordial dwarfism, type 3
- Microcephalic primordial dwarfism due to ZNF335 deficiency
- Microcephaly 13, primary, autosomal recessive
- Microcephaly 16, primary, autosomal recessive
- Microcephaly 2, primary, autosomal recessive, with or without cortical malformations
- Microcephaly 4, primary, autosomal recessive

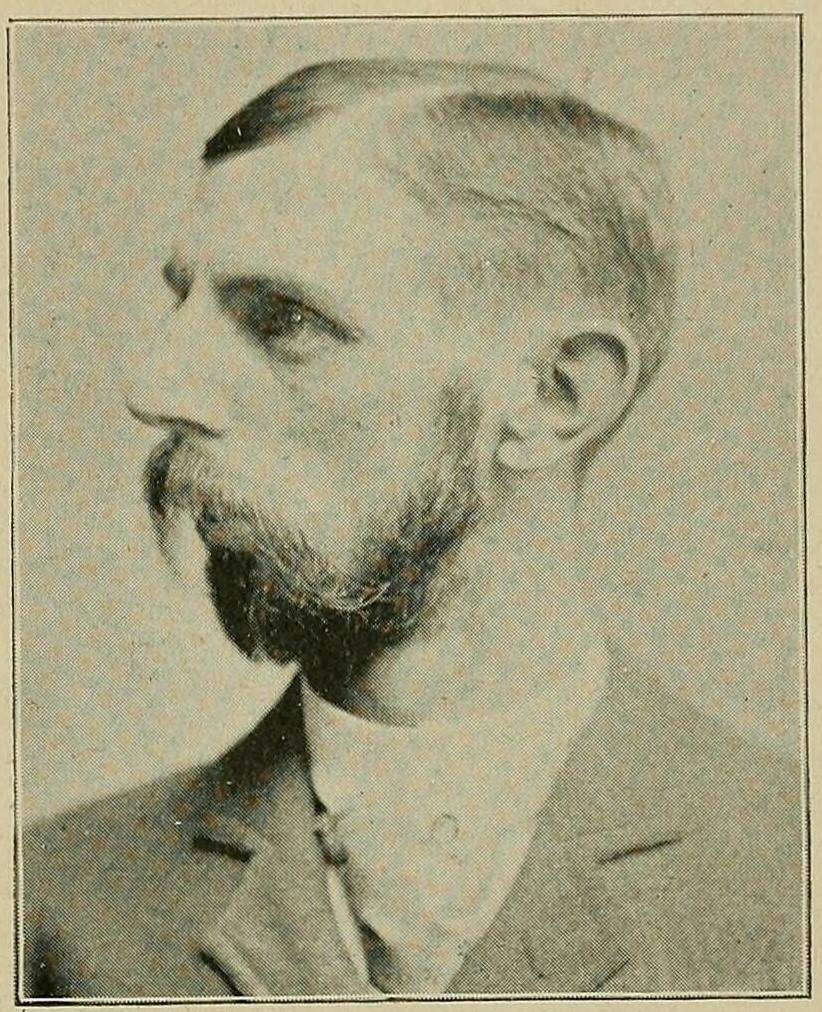
Micrognathism in microcephaly (with normal intelligence)

- Microcephaly, normal intelligence and immunodeficiency
- Microphthalmia, syndromic 12
- Miller syndrome
- Mohr syndrome
- Mucolipidosis type II
- Mucopolysaccharidosis, MPS-I-H/S
- Multiple congenital anomalies-hypotonia-seizures syndrome 1 and 2
- Myofibrillar myopathy 8
- Nager syndrome
- NEK9-related lethal skeletal dysplasia
- Nemaline myopathy 9
- Neonatal pseudo-hydrocephalic progeroid syndrome
- Nephrotic syndrome, type 11
- Nestor-Guillermo progeria syndrome
- Neu–Laxova syndrome 1 and 2
- Neuropathy, congenital hypomyelinating, 3
- Noonan syndrome 1, 2, and 13
- Oculodentodigital dysplasia, autosomal recessive
- Ogden syndrome
- Orofacial cleft 13
- Orofacialdigital syndrome IV
- Orofaciodigital syndrome types 6 and 14
- Osteogenesis imperfecta types 3, 10, 12, and 18
- Osteopathia striata with cranial sclerosis
- Oto-palato-digital syndrome, type II
- Otospondylomegaepiphyseal dysplasia, autosomal recessive
- Pallister–Killian syndrome
- Paris-Trousseau thrombocytopenia
- Periventricular nodular heterotopia 7
- Perlman syndrome
- Peroxisome biogenesis disorder 10A (Zellweger)
- Peroxisome biogenesis disorder 13A (Zellweger)
- Peroxisome biogenesis disorder 1A (Zellweger)
- Peroxisome biogenesis disorder 2A (Zellweger)
- Peroxisome biogenesis disorder 5A (Zellweger)
- PGM1-congenital disorder of glycosylation
- Phelan–McDermid syndrome
- Pierre Robin sequence with pectus excavatum and rib and scapular anomalies
- Pierre Robin syndrome-faciodigital anomaly syndrome
- Poikiloderma with neutropenia
- Polymicrogyria with or without vascular-type Ehlers–Danlos syndrome
- Pontocerebellar hypoplasia types 2E, 7, and 12
- Potocki–Lupski syndrome
- Prolidase deficiency
- Pyknodysostosis

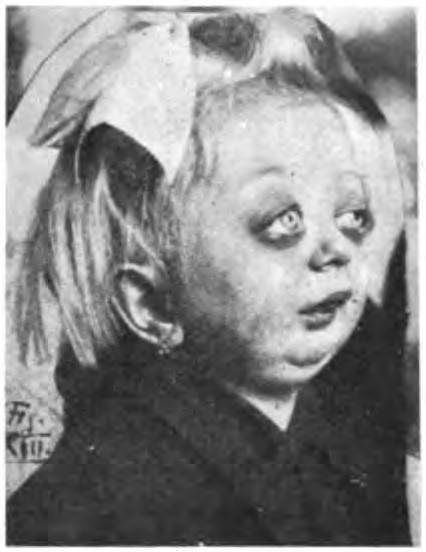
Micrognathism in Carpenter syndrome

- RAB23-related Carpenter syndrome
- Renpenning syndrome
- Restrictive dermopathy 1
- RFT1-congenital disorder of glycosylation
- Rhizomelic chondrodysplasia punctata types 1 and 2
- Ritscher–Schinzel syndrome 1 and 3
- Roberts-SC phocomelia syndrome
- Robinow syndrome, autosomal recessive 2
- Rothmund–Thomson syndrome type 2
- Rubinstein–Taybi syndrome due to 16p13.3 microdeletion
- Rubinstein–Taybi syndrome due to CREBBP mutations
- Rubinstein–Taybi syndrome due to EP300 haploinsufficiency
- Schwartz–Jampel syndrome type 1
- Seckel syndrome 1, 2, 5, 8, and 9
- SHORT syndrome
- Shprintzen–Goldberg syndrome
- Silver–Russell syndrome 1 and 2
- Smith–Lemli–Opitz syndrome
- Spinal muscular atrophy, lower extremity-predominant, 2b, prenatal onset, autosomal dominant
- Splenogonadal fusion-limb defects-micrognathia syndrome
- Spondyloepimetaphyseal dysplasia with joint laxity, type 1, with or without fractures
- Spondyloepimetaphyseal dysplasia-short limb-abnormal calcification syndrome
- Squalene synthase deficiency
- SSR4-congenital disorder of glycosylation
- Stickler syndrome types 1 and 2
- Stromme syndrome
- Syndromic X-linked intellectual disability Claes-Jensen type
- Syndromic X-linked intellectual disability Najm type
- Tetraamelia syndrome 1 and 2
- Thickened earlobes-conductive deafness syndrome
- Toriello–Carey syndrome
- Treacher Collins syndrome
- Ventriculomegaly and arthrogryposis
- Vici syndrome
- Whistling face syndrome, recessive form
- Wiedemann–Steiner syndrome
- X-linked intellectual disability with marfanoid habitus
- Yunis–Varon syndrome
- Zaki syndrome

== Diagnosis ==
It can be detected by the naked eye as well as dental or skull X-ray testing.

== Treatments ==
Micrognathia can be treated by surgery.

== See also ==
- Human mandible
- Macrognathism
- Retrognathism
