= Cerebro-costo-mandibular syndrome =

- Specialty: Medical genetics
- Symptoms: Jaw, rib, and palate anomalies
- Usual onset: Birth
- Duration: Lifelong
- Causes: Genetic mutation
- Prevention: none
- Prognosis: Depends on the case
- Frequency: very rare, only 110 cases have been described in medical literature
- Deaths: -

Cerebro-costo-mandibular syndrome is a very rare genetic disorder which is characterized by jaw/chin, palate and rib abnormalities.

== Signs and symptoms ==
The following list comprises the most common symptoms people with this disorder exhibit:

- Severe micrognathia
- Thorax in the shape of a bell
- Cleft palate
- Neonatal respiratory difficulties
- Rib gaps

Common (but not the most) symptoms include:

- External auditory canal atresia
- Hearing loss
- Failure to thrive
- Glossoptosis
- Intellectual disabilities
- Fetal growth delays
- Kyphosis
- Short height
- Tracheomalacia

Not common but also not rare symptoms include:

- Fifth finger clinodactyly
- Cerebral calcification
- Hydranencephaly
- Meningocele
- Microcephaly
- Polycystic kidney dysplasia
- Myelomeningocele
- Porencephalic cyst
- Short, hard palate
- Spina bifida
- Ventricular septal defect
- Webbed neck

== Causes ==
This disorder is caused by autosomal dominant mutations in the SNRPB gene, in chromosome 20.

== Epidemiology ==
Only 110 cases have been described in medical literature.
