= Toriello–Carey syndrome =

- Specialty: Medical genetics

Toriello–Carey syndrome is a genetic disorder that is characterized by Pierre Robin sequence and agenesis of the corpus callosum. Children with the disorder also possess a characteristic facial phenotype.

== Presentation ==
One of the main characteristics of the disorder is its facial phenotype. Children have hypertelorism or telecanthus, small nose, short or sparse eyelashes, oral anomalies (such as cleft palate, Pierre Robin sequence, and micrognathism), abnormal ears, and a short neck. Regarding growth and development, children experience intellectual disability and post-natal growth failure (such as failure to thrive and delayed milestone). Neurological abnormalities include defects of the corpus callosum, hypotonia, and hearing loss.

== Causes ==
The etiology of the disorder is not fully understood. Genetic anomalies have been found in approximately 20% of patients. Genetic analysis of these patients suggests Toriello–Carey syndrome is a heterogeneous disorder. Candidate genes include MN1 and SATB2. In patients without genetic anomalies, the basis for the disorder is undetermined.
