= Multiple congenital anomalies-hypotonia-seizures syndrome =

- Specialty: Medical genetics
- Symptoms: Hypotonia, congenital anomalies and seizures
- Complications: Early death
- Usual onset: Birth
- Duration: Life-long (short life span)
- Types: 1, 2, 3, 4
- Causes: Genetic mutation
- Prevention: none
- Prognosis: Bad
- Frequency: very rare, only 15 cases have been reported in medical literature.

Multiple congenital anomalies-hypotonia-seizures syndrome (MCAHS) is a rare multi-systemic genetic disorder which is characterized by developmental delay, seizures, hypotonia and heart, urinary, and gastrointestinal abnormalities.

== Presentation ==
People with this disorder often show the following symptoms:

=== General ===
- Hypotonia
- Widespread developmental delays
- Early-onset seizures

=== Heart ===
- Patent foramen ovale
- Atrial septal defect
- Patent ductus arteriosus

=== Genito-urinary ===
- Hydrocele
- Renal collection system dilatation
- Hydroureter
- Hydronephrosis
- Trabecular urinary bladder hypertrophy

=== Gastrointestinal ===
- Gastroesophageal reflux
- Anal stenosis
- Imperforate anus
- Ano-vestibular fistula

=== Facial ===
- Coarse face
- Occiput prominence
- Bitemporal narrowing
- Epicanthal folds
- Hypertelorbitism
- Nystagmus
- Strabismus
- Distracted eyes
- Low-set prominent ears
- Nasal bridge depression
- Upward-facing nose
- Long philtrum
- Large, constantly open mouth
- Thin lips
- High palate
- Micro/retrognathia

=== Auricular ===
- Auricle abnormalities

== Causes ==
It is caused by an autosomal recessive mutation in PIGN (gene), on chromosome 18. It is caused by a C to A nucleotide substitution.

== Epidemiology ==
Only 15 cases of this syndrome have been reported in medical literature.
