= Macrognathism =

- Other names: Megagnathia
- Specialty: ENT surgery

Macrognathism is an abnormally large or protruding jaw. The opposite condition is called micrognathia.

== Causes ==
- Heredity
- Pituitary gigantism
- Paget's disease of bone
- Acromegaly
- Fetal alcohol syndrome
- Leontiasis ossea
- Cleidocranial dysplasia

== Treatment ==
Treatment is surgical. Osteotomy may be done in case of maxillary macrognathia. Mandibular macrognathia is generally managed by resection of a portion of the mandible.
