= Fibrochondrogenesis =

- Fibrochondrogenesis has an autosomal recessive pattern of inheritance.
- Specialty: Medical genetics

Fibrochondrogenesis is a rare autosomal recessive form of osteochondrodysplasia, causing abnormal fibrous development of cartilage and related tissues.

It is a lethal rhizomelic (malformations which result in short, underdeveloped limbs) form of dwarfism, exhibiting both skeletal dysplasia (malformations of bone) and fibroblastic dysplasia (abnormal development of fibroblasts, specialized cells that make up fibrous connective tissue, which plays a role in the formation of cellular structure and promotes healing of damaged tissues). Death caused by complications of fibrochondrogenesis occurs in infancy.

== Presentation ==
Fibrochondrogenesis is a congenital disorder presenting several features and radiological findings, some which distinguish it from other osteochondrodysplasias. These include: fibroblastic dysplasia and fibrosis of chondrocytes (cells which form cartilage); and flared, widened long bone metaphyses (the portion of bone that grows during childhood).

Other prominent features include dwarfism, shortened ribs that have a concave appearance, micrognathism (severely underdeveloped jaw), macrocephaly (enlarged head), thoracic hypoplasia (underdeveloped chest), enlarged stomach, platyspondyly (flattened spine), and the somewhat uncommon deformity of bifid tongue (in which the tongue appears split, resembling that of a reptile).

== Cause ==
The cause of platyspondyly in fibrochondrogenesis can be attributed in part to odd malformations and structural flaws found in the vertebral bodies of the spinal column in affected infants.

Fibrochondrogenesis alters the normal function of chondrocytes, fibroblasts, metaphyseal cells and others associated with cartilage, bone and connective tissues. Overwhelming disorganization of cellular processes involved in the formation of cartilage and bone (ossification), in combination with fibroblastic degeneration of these cells, developmental errors and systemic skeletal malformations describes the severity of this lethal osteochondrodysplasia.

== Genetics ==
Fibrochondrogenesis is inherited in an autosomal recessive pattern. This means that the defective gene responsible for the disorder is located on an autosome, and two copies of the gene — one copy inherited from each parent — are required in order to be born with the disorder. The parents of an individual with an autosomal recessive disorder each carry one copy of the defective gene, but usually do not experience any signs or symptoms of the disorder. Currently, no specific genetic mutation has been established as the cause of fibrochondrogenesis.

Omphalocele is a congenital feature where the abdominal wall has an opening, partially exposing the abdominal viscera (typically, the organs of the gastrointestinal tract). Fibrochondrogenesis is believed to be related to omphalocele type III, suggesting a possible genetic association between the two disorders.

== Epidemiology ==
Fibrochondrogenesis is quite rare. A 1996 study from Spain determined a national minimal prevalence for the disorder at 8 cases out of 1,158,067 live births.

A United Arab Emirates (UAE) University report, from early 2003, evaluated the results of a 5-year study on the occurrence of a broad range of osteochondrodysplasias. Out of 38,048 newborns in Al Ain, over the course of the study period, fibrochondrogenesis was found to be the most common of the recessive forms of osteochondrodysplasia, with a prevalence ratio of 1.05:10,000 births.

While these results represented the most common occurrence within the group studied, they do not dispute the rarity of fibrochondrogenesis. The study also included the high rate of consanguinous marriages as a prevailing factor for these disorders, as well as the extremely low rate of diagnosis-related pregnancy terminations throughout the region.

== Research ==
The fibrocartilaginous effects of fibrochondrogenesis on chondrocytes has shown potential as a means to produce therapeutic cellular biomaterials via tissue engineering and manipulation of stem cells, specifically human embryonic stem cells.

Utilization of these cells as curative cartilage replacement materials on the cellular level has shown promise, with beneficial applications including the repair and healing of damaged knee menisci and synovial joints; temporomandibular joints, and vertebra.

== See also ==
- Fibrocyte
- Boomerang dysplasia
- Cystic fibrosis
