= Marden–Walker syndrome =

Marden-Walker syndrome
- Other names: Connective tissue disorder Marden Walker type
- Marden-Walker syndrome has an autosomal recessive pattern of inheritance.

Marden–Walker syndrome (MWS) is a rare autosomal recessive congenital disorder. It is characterized by blepharophimosis, microcephaly, micrognathia, multiple joint contractures, arachnodactyly, camptodactyly, kyphoscoliosis and delayed motor development and is often associated with cystic dysplastic kidneys, dextrocardia, Dandy–Walker malformation and agenesis of corpus callosum.

== Signs and symptoms ==
Most of the signs of MWS are present during the neonatal period. The most common signs at this state are multiple congenital joint contractures, dysmorphic features with mask-like face, blepharophimosis, ptosis, micrognathia, cleft or high arched palate, low-set ears, arachnodactyly, chest deformation as pectus, kyphoscoliosis and absent deep tendon reflexes are frequent minor malformations have also been described and consist of renal anomalies, cardiovascular abnormalities, hypospadias, omphalomesenteric duct, hypertrophic pyloric stenosis and duodenal bands, hypoplastic right lower lobe of the lung, displacement of the larynx to the right and vertebral abnormalities, cerebral malformations.

- 75% of children with MWS have blepharophimosis, small mouth, micrognathia, kyphosis/scoliosis, radio ulnar synostose and multiple contractures.
- They have severe developmental delay; congenital joint contractures and blepharophimosis should be present in every patient
- 2 out of 3 of the following signs should be manifested: post natal growth, mask-like faces, retardation, and decreased muscular mass.
- Additional signs may include; micrognathia, high arched or cleft palate, low set ears, kyphoscoliosis.
- The symptoms of MWS are normally diagnosed during the newborn period.

=== Progression ===
The natural history of MWS is not well known: many patients died in infancy and clinical follow-up has been reported in few surviving adults. However, diagnosis may be more difficult to establish in adults patients, such as: blepharophimosis, contractures, growth retardation, and developmental delay, whereas minor face anomalies are less noticeable as the patient grows older.

== Cause ==
MWS is a heterogeneous, initially described as a syndrome. But this condition is more on the lines of a phenotypic expression of various heterogeneous diseases and belongs to the second group in the classification of arthrogryposis. Unknown congenital myopathy has been suspected to underlie MWS due to muscular involvement, but extension of the neuromuscular systems failed to identify a primary myopathy in patients with MWS. Secondary muscle involvement from a CNS lesion may occur. This could lead to congenital weakness with hypoatonia deep tendon reflex.

=== Genetics ===
MWS is inherited in an autosomal recessive manner. This means the defective gene responsible for the disorder is located on an autosome, and two copies of the defective gene (one inherited from each parent) are required in order to be born with the disorder. The parents of an individual with an autosomal recessive disorder both carry one copy of the defective gene, but usually do not experience any signs or symptoms of the disorder.

== Pathophysiology ==
Though the pathomechanism of Marden–Walker syndrome is unknown, it may be caused by a genetic defect which manifests as a dysfunctional molecular mechanism in the primary cilia structures of the cell. These organelles are present in many cellular types throughout the human body. The cilia defects adversely affect "numerous critical developmental signaling pathways" essential to cellular development.

== Management ==
The only treatment for MWS is only symptomatic, with multidisciplinary management

== Epidemiology ==
There have been 30 cases of Marden-Walker Syndrome reported since 1966. The first case of this was in 1966 a female infant was diagnosed with blepharophimosis, joint contractures, arachnodactyly and growth development delay. She ended up dying at 3 months due to pneumonia.
