= HNRPH2 =

Protein-coding gene in the species Homo sapiens

HNRNPH2
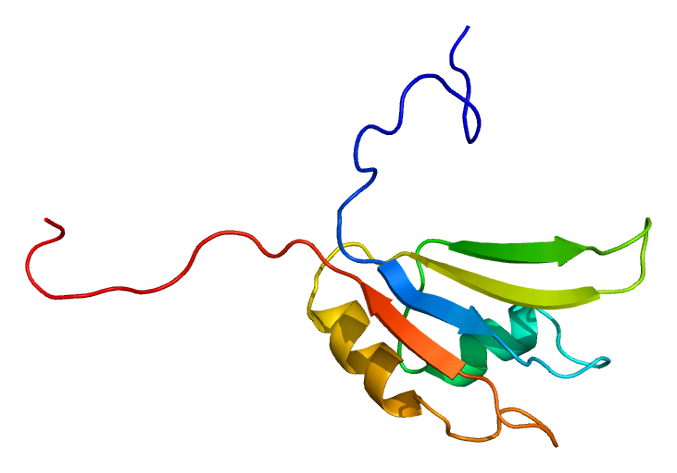

Identifiers
- Aliases: HNRNPH2, FTP3, HNRPH', HNRPH2, hnRNPH', heterogeneous nuclear ribonucleoprotein H2 (H'), heterogeneous nuclear ribonucleoprotein H2, MRXSB, NRPH2
- External IDs: OMIM: 300610; MGI: 1201779; GeneCards: HNRNPH2
Available structures
PDB	Ortholog search: PDBe RCSB
PDB	List of PDB id codes 1WEZ, 1WG5

Gene location (Human)
Chr.	X chromosome (human)
Band	Xq22.1	Start	101,408,222 bp
Band	Xq22.1	End	101,414,133 bp

Gene location (Mouse)
Chr.	X chromosome (mouse)
Band	X E3|X 56.2 cM	Start	133,501,928 bp
Band	X E3|X 56.2 cM	End	133,507,809 bp
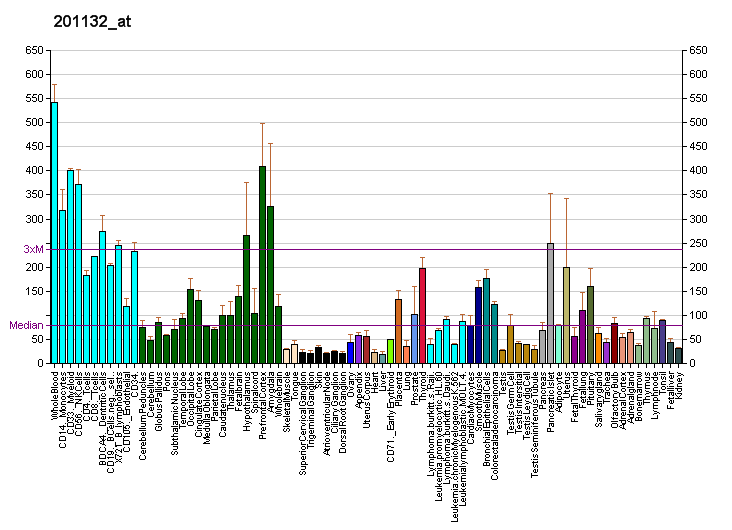
RNA expression pattern
Bgee	Human / Mouse (ortholog); Top expressed in: Epithelium of choroid plexus; islet of Langerhans; seminal vesicula; monocyte; Skeletal muscle tissue of rectus abdominis; palpebral conjunctiva; prefrontal cortex; ventricular zone; human penis; endometrium / Top expressed in: ventricular zone; neural layer of retina; epiblast; dentate gyrus of hippocampal formation granule cell; ganglionic eminence; neural tube; hippocampus proper; lens; olfactory bulb; primary visual cortex; More reference expression data
BioGPS	More reference expression data
Gene ontology
Molecular function	protein binding; nucleic acid binding; RNA binding
Cellular component	membrane; nucleus; nucleoplasm; cytosol; postsynaptic density; ribonucleoprotein complex
Biological process	mRNA splicing, via spliceosome; RNA metabolic process
Sources:Amigo / QuickGO
Orthologs
Databases	NCBI: entry; OMA: entry
Species	Human	Mouse
Entrez	3188	56258
Ensembl	ENSG00000126945	ENSMUSG00000045427
UniProt	P55795	P70333
RefSeq (mRNA)	NM_019597; NM_001032393	NM_019868; NM_001313716; NM_001313717
RefSeq (protein)	NP_001027565; NP_062543	NP_001300645; NP_001300646; NP_063921
Location (UCSC)	Chr X: 101.41 – 101.41 Mb	Chr X: 133.5 – 133.51 Mb
PubMed search
- Wikidata
View/Edit Human	View/Edit Mouse

Heterogeneous nuclear ribonucleoprotein H2 is a protein that in humans is encoded by the HNRNPH2 gene.

== Gene ==
Alternative splicing results in multiple transcript variants encoding the same protein.

== Structure ==
The protein encoded by this gene has three repeats of quasi-RRM domains that binds to RNAs. It is very similar to the family member HNRPH1.

== Function ==
This gene belongs to the subfamily of ubiquitously expressed heterogeneous nuclear ribonucleoproteins (hnRNPs). The hnRNPs are RNA binding proteins and they complex with heterogeneous nuclear RNA (hnRNA). These proteins are associated with pre-mRNAs in the nucleus and appear to influence pre-mRNA processing and other aspects of mRNA metabolism and transport. While all of the hnRNPs are present in the nucleus some seem to shuttle between the nucleus and the cytoplasm. The hnRNP proteins have distinct nucleic acid binding properties.

== Clinical significance ==
This gene is thought to be involved in Fabry disease and X-linked agammaglobulinemia phenotype.

Mutations in this gene causes HNRNPH2-related disorder.
