= Aprosencephaly cerebellar dysgenesis =

- Other names: Aprosencephaly and cerebellar dysgenesis

Aprosencephaly cerebellar dysgenesis is a rare, non-syndromic central nervous system malformation characterized by the absence of the telencephalon and diencephalic structures. These are often combined with severe abnormalities in the mesencephalon and cerebellum.

== Signs and symptoms ==
Features of this condition include:

- Forked uvula
- Clubfoot
- Retinal dysplasia
- Premature skull fusion in infants
- Micrognathia
- Absent mesencephalon
- Aprosencephaly
- Cerebellar dysplasia
- Poorly formed metencephalon

Malformations extending to the hands and feet have also been described.

== Causes ==
This condition is genetic, but its origins are unclear. The symptoms presented suggested OTX2 expression, but testing found no variation of OTX2 in patients. This condition is believed to be autosomal recessive.

== History ==
The condition was first described in 1996.
