= Briel Adams-Wheatley =

Brazilian-born American beauty influencer (born 1998)

- Born: November 16, 1998 (age 28); São Paulo, Brazil
- Citizenship: American
- Occupations: Beauty influencer, motivational speaker
- Years active: 2019–present
- Known for: Makeup and accessibility content on TikTok
- Spouse: Adam Adams-Wheatley

Briel Adams-Wheatley (formerly Gabe Adams-Wheatley, born 16 November 1998) is a Brazilian-born American beauty influencer, motivational speaker, and accessibility advocate. She was born without limbs due to Hanhart syndrome and she became known on TikTok for posting videos of her makeup routines and mobility equipment.

== Early life and education ==
Adams-Wheatley was born in São Paulo, Brazil. She was born with Hanhart Syndrome, a rare genetic condition and congenital disability of the musculoskeletal system, causing her to be born without limbs. She was adopted by a family in Utah, USA at 9 months old, after her birth mother realised that she could not afford the medical costs to support her baby's needs. She is one of 14 children in her adoptive family.

In Kaysville, Utah, Adams-Wheatley was raised in the Church of Jesus Christ of Latter-day Saints. Adams-Wheatley has stated her adopted mother encouraged as much independence as possible, including navigating stairs on her own and participating in dance at school. She went on to compete in dance competitions in high school, where she would experiment with makeup, on and off stage.

== Career ==
Adams-Wheatley is a beauty influencer and a motivational speaker who posts videos on social media showing how she does her makeup and gets dressed with mobility equipment. As of October 2023, she has a following of over 4 million on TikTok and her videos often go viral.

She initially practised make-up in secret by watching YouTube tutorials. She later posted her first tutorial on TikTok in 2019. A few years into her career as an influencer, Adams-Wheatley came out publicly in 2023 as transgender.

Adams-Wheatley has stated that she sees make-up as a means of personal expression beyond societal norms. She has made plans to establish her own beauty brand.

== Appearances ==
In 2022, she visited the White House for a Pride celebration and also sat in the front row of New York Fashion Week in November 2023. In 2025, Adams-Wheatley featured in series four of Dating PrEP. She has also spoken at YouTube convention VidCon 2025.

== Personal life ==
Adams-Wheatley is married to her husband, Adam.
