= Thickened earlobes-conductive deafness syndrome =

- Other names: Escher-Hirt syndrome, Schweitzer Kemink Graham syndrome
- Specialty: Medical genetics
- Symptoms: Ear, auditory, and jaw anomalies
- Complications: Hearing loss
- Usual onset: Early infancy, but whether or not the symptoms will show up is congenital
- Duration: Life-long
- Prevention: none
- Prognosis: Ok
- Frequency: very rare, only 2 families worldwide are known to have the disorder
- Deaths: -

Thickened earlobes-conductive deafness syndrome, also known as Escher-Hirt syndrome, or Schweitzer Kemink Graham syndrome, is a rare genetic disorder which is characterized by ear and jaw abnormalities associated with progressive hearing loss. Two families worldwide have been described with the disorder.

== Presentation ==
People with the disorder often have the following symptoms:

=== Ear/Auditory ===
- Microtia (abnormally small ears)
- Thick earlobes
- Conductive hearing loss
- Congenital auditory ossicle anomalies

=== Jaw ===
- Micrognathia

== Etiology ==
Escher et al. described a family with dominantly inherited conductive deafness caused by ear anomalies in 1968 and Wilmot et al. described another family with the same symptoms and mode of inheritance in 1970, Schweitzer et al described the symptoms and declared a novel syndrome in 1984.
