= HNRNPH2-related disorders =

hnRNPH2-related disorders
- Other names: Bain type X-linked intellectual disability
- Symptoms: Impairments in language and coordination, gastrointestinal issues, strabismus

HNRNPH2-related disorder is considered as a neurodevelopmental disorder (NDD) caused by heterozygous mutation in the HNRNPH2 gene on the chromosome Xq22.

This gene (GenBank: NM_019597.4) encodes a member of a family of ubiquitous heterogeneous nuclear ribonucleoproteins (HNRNP). The HNRNPs are a large group of RNA binding proteins with distinct nucleic acid binding properties. These ribonucleoproteins act as a shuttle between the nucleus and the cytoplasm and act on pre-mRNA to positively or negatively affect spliceosome assembly at nearby splice sites, thereby controlling pre-mRNA splicing.

HNRNPH2 genetic mutations will be manifested by neurodevelopmental phenotype including developmental delay, intellectual disability, hypotonia, and seizures, among other characteristics. Because the disorder is X-linked, and because of an initial difficulty in identifying male patients, it was initially believed that the disorder affected females only while male conceptuses were unviable More recent studies have identified male patients, though they are still significantly fewer.

== Signs and symptoms ==
HNRNPH2-related disorders typically manifest in children before the age of 12 months. Symptoms are abnormally slow development, especially in the area of motor development. After the first year the majority of children with these disorders show either nonverbal or minimally verbal speech disorders.

Many caregivers will notice problems with feeding and report abnormal weight issues and a failure to thrive with continuing gastrointestinal issues such as chronic constipation, poor appetite and difficulty swallowing.

Many children develop orthopedic issues such as scoliosis and hip dysplasia, and nearly all children have hypotonia (decreased muscle tone) leading to difficulties in walking and other forms of movement.

Nearly three quarters of children have vision problems, with a majority of these reporting strabismus (crossed eyes), and many patients have sensory processing disorders and other sensory issues.

Almost half of individuals with HNRNPH2-related disorders have suffered seizures, with the earliest reported first-seizure at the age of three, and the latest first-seizure at the age of thirty-four.

== Prevalence ==
HNRNPH2-related disorder is described as being an ultra-rare disease; in 2021 there were 33 diagnosed cases worldwide.

== Diagnosis and treatment ==
A positive diagnosis for HNRNPH2-related disorder is confirmed through reviews of whole exome sequencing genetic reports by qualified medical professionals along with additional information provided by the primary caregivers.

Currently there are no cures for HNRNPH2-related disorder, though not all patients require treatment or additional therapies.

It is important that specialists in paediatric neurology, paediatric orthopedics, paediatric gastroenterology, and paediatric ophthalmology are consulted.

Therapies that are known to be beneficial to HNRNPH2-related disorder patients include physical therapy, occupational therapy and speech therapy. Some patients take additional therapy and medication for anxiety, gastrointestinal issues, seizures etc. Every patient should work with their medical team to develop the appropriate therapeutic program that will meet their specific needs.
