= SSR4 =

Protein-coding gene in the species Homo sapiens

Identifiers
- Aliases: SSR4, TRAPD, CDG1Y, signal sequence receptor subunit 4
- External IDs: OMIM: 300090; MGI: 1099464; GeneCards: SSR4

Gene location (Human)
Chr.	X chromosome (human)
Band	Xq28	Start	153,793,516 bp
Band	Xq28	End	153,798,499 bp

Gene location (Mouse)
Chr.	X chromosome (mouse)
Band	X A7.3|X 37.41 cM	Start	72,830,634 bp
Band	X A7.3|X 37.41 cM	End	72,834,436 bp
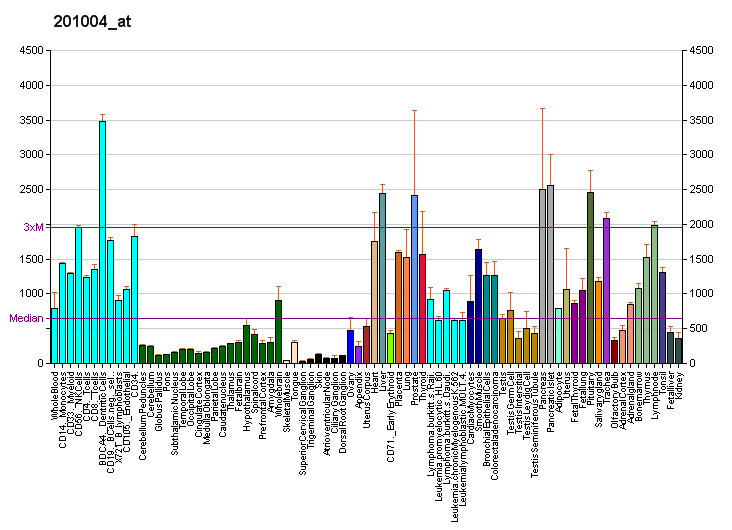
RNA expression pattern
Bgee	Human / Mouse (ortholog); Top expressed in: pituitary gland; anterior pituitary; body of pancreas; seminal vesicula; trachea; pylorus; minor salivary glands; corpus epididymis; stromal cell of endometrium; body of stomach / Top expressed in: seminal vesicula; parotid gland; islet of Langerhans; submandibular gland; molar; gastrula; lacrimal gland; cervix; calvaria; decidua; More reference expression data
BioGPS	More reference expression data
Orthologs
Databases	NCBI: entry; OMA: entry
Species	Human	Mouse
Entrez	6748	20832
Ensembl	ENSG00000180879	ENSMUSG00000002014
UniProt	P51571	Q62186
RefSeq (mRNA)	NM_001204526; NM_001204527; NM_006280	NM_001166480; NM_009279; NM_001358212; NM_001358213
RefSeq (protein)	NP_001191455; NP_001191456; NP_006271	NP_001159952; NP_033305; NP_001345141; NP_001345142
Location (UCSC)	Chr X: 153.79 – 153.8 Mb	Chr X: 72.83 – 72.83 Mb
PubMed search
- Wikidata
View/Edit Human	View/Edit Mouse

Translocon-associated protein subunit delta is a protein that in humans is encoded by the SSR4 gene.

SSR4, also called TRAPD, is assumed to be involved in protein secretion. It is located in the Xq28 region, arranged in a compact head-to-head manner with the IDH3G gene. These two genes are driven by a bidirectional promoter located between them and encode proteins involved in unrelated biochemical pathways located in different compartments of the cell. The nontranscribed intergenic region represents only 133 bp and is embedded in a CpG island. The CpG island functions as a bidirectional promoter to initiate the transcription of both functionally unrelated genes with distinct expression patterns. SSR4 consists of six exons and is approximately 70 kb telomeric length from the ALD gene. Although alternative splicing of exon 5 has not been detected in the human SSR4 gene, transcript variants missing the region homologous to the human exon 5 have been detected in both Xenopus laevis and Mus musculus.
