= Mandibular incisor =

Mandibular incisor may refer to:

- Mandibular central incisor
- Mandibular lateral incisor
