= Menke-Hennekam syndrome =

- Autosomal dominant pattern is the inheritance manner of this condition
- Specialty: Medical genetics
- Causes: Mutations in the CREBBP gene

Menke-Hennekam syndrome is a rare condition characterised by a constellation of lesions mostly involving the brain.

== Signs and symptoms ==
The feature of this condition include

- Microcephaly
- Ventriculomegaly
- Absent corpus callosum
- Autistic behavior
- Feeding problems
- Epilepsy
- Variable intellectual disability
- Staphyloma
- Cochlear malformations
- Mild hearing impairment
- Exomphalos
- Short stature
- Recurrent upper airway infections

== Genetics ==
This condition has been associated with mutations in the CREB binding protein gene (CREBBP). This gene is located on the short arm of chromosome 16 (16p13.3).

== Pathophysiology ==
The pathogenesis of this condition is not understood.

== Diagnosis ==
This syndrome may be suspected on clinical grounds. The diagnosis is established by sequencing the CREBBP gene.

=== Differential diagnosis ===
- Rubinstein-Taybi syndrome

== Treatment ==
There is no specific treatment for this condition. Management is supportive.

== Epidemiology ==
This condition is considered to be rare with less than 20 cases reported in the literature.

== History ==
This condition was first described in 2019.
