= Hypoglossia =

- Specialty: Medical genetics

Hypoglossia is a short, incompletely developed tongue. It can occur either as an isolated malformation or in association with other deformities, particularly limb defects in a syndrome known as oromandibular limb hypogenesis syndrome.

== See also ==
- Hanhart Syndrome
