= Glossoptosis =

Medical condition

Glossoptosis is a medical condition and abnormality which involves the downward displacement or retraction of the tongue. This mostly affects infants and children. It may cause non-fusion of the hard palate, causing cleft palate. It can also cause difficulties with feeding and upper airway obstructions. Glossoptosis could be a symptom of a birth defect from Pierre Robin Syndrome. It can also arise with Down syndrome and cerebral palsy.

== Signs and symptoms ==
Glossoptosis is characterized by an abnormal posterior placement of the tongue like a downward displacement or retraction. This characteristic causes other symptoms to arise because of the abnormality. Glossoptosis may cause upper airway obstruction which can lead to infants not getting enough oxygen. Not only may they not get enough oxygen they most likely will experience shortness of breath and struggle to breathe.

Not being able to breathe properly can lead to other difficulties like struggling to breastfeed or even eat because of the lack of oxygen. Infants and children can also have difficulties swallowing because of the abnormal placement of the tongue. If they are unable to eat properly this can cause a lack of nutrients in the infants or children affected with the abnormality, and most likely will fail to thrive.

Another symptom of glossoptosis can be obstructive sleep apnea. A study showed that 25% of children who were sent for fluoroscopic sleep studies showed glossoptosis as a cause of airway obstruction leading to sleep apnea. Some children affected with glossoptosis can also experience speech issues.

== Causes ==
Glossoptosis can be caused by birth defects one being Pierre Robin Syndrome (PRS). Birth defects usually occur during the pregnancy and are present at birth. They are not preventable. Pierre Robin Syndrome specifically targets infants’ jaws and may not form properly. Pierre Robin Syndrome is also known as Pierre Robin sequence because it is a sequence of disorders, one causing the next. For example, micrognathia in PRS can lead to glossoptosis and that leads to airway obstruction.

Genetic disorders can cause glossoptosis as well. Genetic disorders happen when there is a mutation or change in a gene. They can also be passed down from parents to their children. Down syndrome is one of those genetic disorders that can cause glossoptosis in a child.

Neuromuscular disorders such as cerebral palsy also causes glossoptosis. Neuromuscular disorders happen when there’s an abnormality in brain development. This can happen during or after pregnancy. Children affected with cerebral palsy have weak muscles which can affect the tongue. Weak tongue muscles lead to children with cerebral palsy having downward displacement or retraction of the tongue.

== Diagnosis ==
There are many ways to diagnose this abnormality. Flexible Fiberoptic Laryngoscopy (aFFL) is a procedure that is most frequently used to diagnose glossoptosis. A study did show that it was not the most reliable, but it can be used to diagnose glossoptosis.

An infant with the condition can have a small lower jaw which can be a physical indicator of glossoptosis and can be used to diagnose the abnormality.

Breathing as well can show the abnormality especially if there are any upper airway obstructions.

== Treatment/Management ==
In many cases, children with Glossoptosis may not need treatment this is because as they grow, their jaw will grow with them. This allows for more room in the mouth for the tongue, and in turn removes glossoptosis.

While infants have a smaller jaw, there are ways to manage the symptoms that come with glossoptosis. Different positions like prone or lateral may relieve or solve the airway obstruction a child may be experiencing. Different positioning of the body as well can help with feeding an infant or child that has glossoptosis.

In the rare cases where symptoms are more severe, treatment is also going to be more extreme. If a child or infant is having trouble breathing due to an airway obstruction they may need to get a breathing tube so they can get enough oxygen, or even in more extreme cases a tracheostomy. Infants may also get a nasopharyngeal (NP) tube to help relieve airway obstructions as well, since an NP is specifically made for obstructions, and reduces the need for any surgical treatment. If an infant is struggling to feed and get enough nutrients a feeding tube may be needed. Early use of a nasogastric tube can be used for infants, to gain weight and get the necessary nutrients to thrive, making it easier to manage the symptom caused by glossoptosis.
