= Agnathia =

Developmental absence of the jaw

- Symptoms: Absence of a portion or the entirety of one or both jaws
- Diagnostic method: X-rays or CT scans of the mandible and temporomandibular joint
- Treatment: Surgery
- Frequency: Rare

Agnathia (also termed hypognathous) is the absence of a portion or the entirety of one or both jaws. It is a very rare condition. External, middle, and inner ear abnormalities, as well as temporal bone, parotid gland, masticatory muscles, and facial neural abnormalities, frequently coexist with agnathia. Agnathia is seen in otocephaly and asplenia with cardiovascular anomalies.

== Diagnosis ==
X-rays or CT scans of the mandible and temporomandibular joint showcase the extent of underdevelopment and differentiate agnathia from other disorders that cause similar facial abnormalities but do not involve substantial structural loss.

== Treatment ==
Agnathia treatment consists of rapid reconstruction using autogenous bone grafting to stop the further development of facial deformity. Mentoplasty, bone and cartilage onlay grafts, and soft-tissue grafts are frequently used to restore facial symmetry. Distraction osteogenesis, which involves performing an osteotomy and attaching a distraction device to both portions of the mandible, is becoming more common. Early orthodontic therapy in adolescents aids in the correction of malocclusion.

== Well-known cases ==
- Isaiah Acosta - He was a Brazilian media personality born with an absent jaw, small mouth opening, and well-developed teeth from the upper jaw. He was born to a mom with a low-lying homestead while doctors confirmed that he wouldn't survive with his rare deformity leading to respiratory distress; he was surgically given a tracheotomy at an early age so he can extend his lifespan. In his mid-teen years, he uploaded a rap music video of himself raising awareness that he couldn't talk.

== See also ==
- Micrognathia
