= Pierre Robin sequence =

- Other names: Pierre Robin syndrome, Pierre Robin malformation, Pierre Robin anomaly, Pierre Robin anomalad
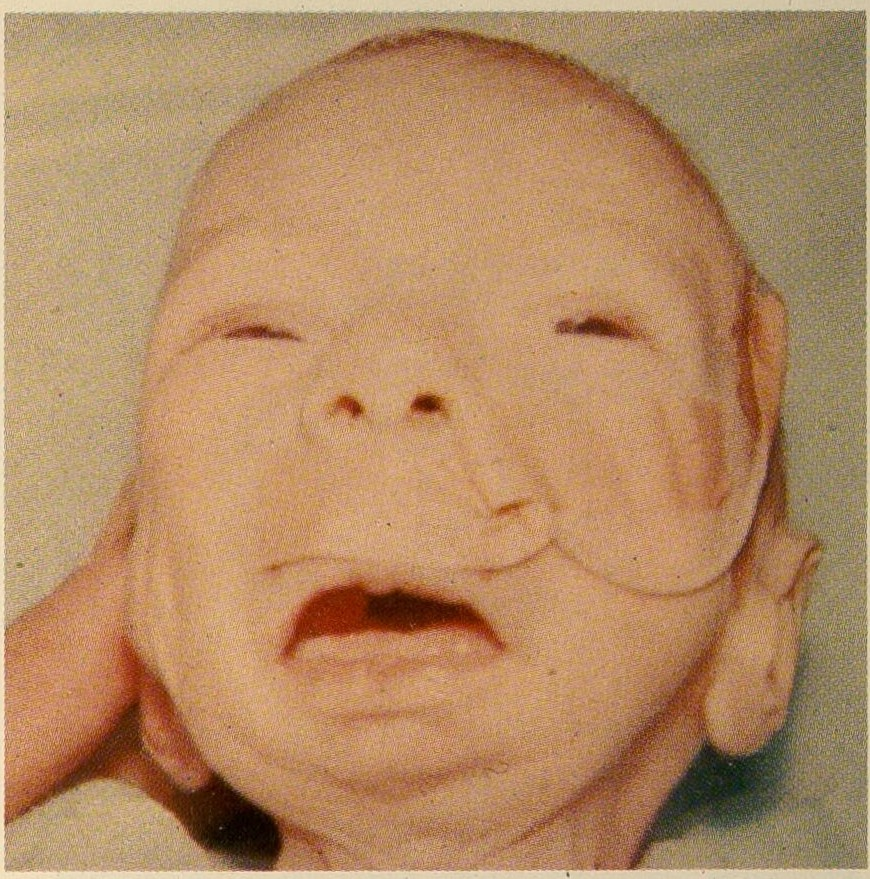
- Infant with Pierre Robin sequence
- Specialty: Medical genetics
- Symptoms: Micrognathia, glossoptosis, obstruction of the upper airway, sometimes cleft palate
- Usual onset: During gestation, present at birth
- Causes: intrauterine compression of fetal mandible, de-novo mutations (on chromosomes 2, 4, 11, or 17) or Stickler syndrome
- Diagnostic method: Physical examination
- Treatment: Craniofacial surgery, oral and maxillofacial surgery
- Frequency: 1 in 8,500 to 14,000 people

Pierre Robin sequence (Note: Formerly known as Pierre Robin syndrome, Pierre Robin malformation, Pierre Robin anomaly or Pierre Robin anomalad.) (/pjɛər rɔːˈbæ̃/; abbreviated PRS), also known as Pierre Robin syndrome, is a congenital defect observed in humans which is characterized by facial abnormalities. The three main features are micrognathia (abnormally small mandible), which causes glossoptosis (downwardly displaced or retracted tongue), which in turn causes breathing problems due to obstruction of the upper airway. A wide, U-shaped cleft palate is commonly also present. PRS is not merely a syndrome, but rather it is a sequence: a series of specific developmental malformations which can be attributed to a single cause.

== Signs and symptoms ==
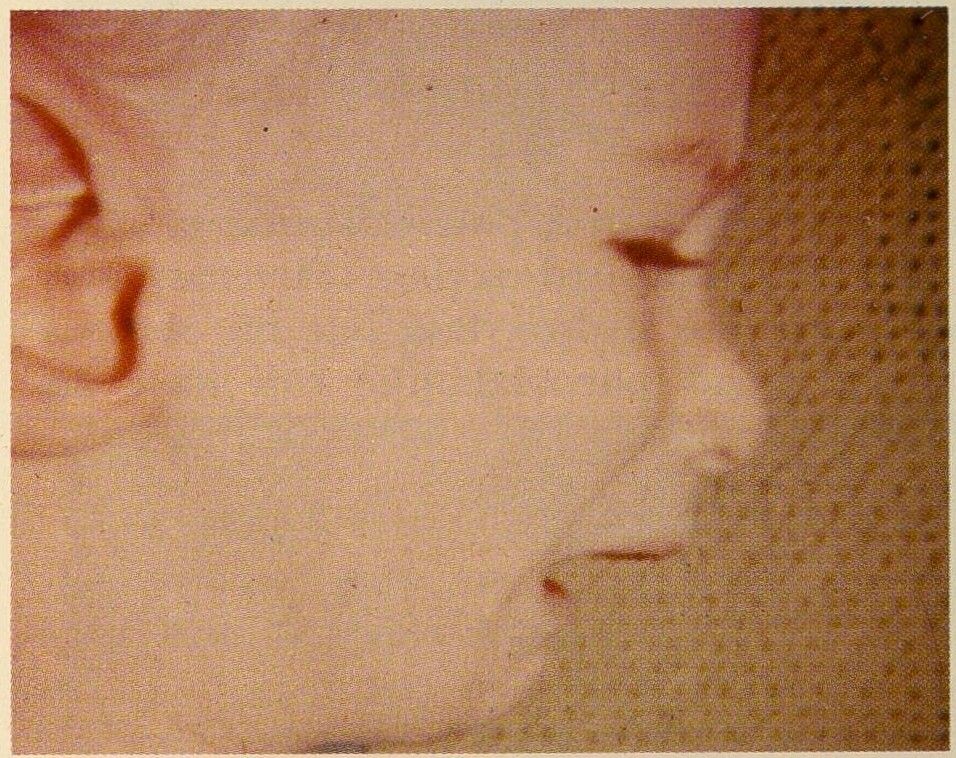
Micrognathism in Pierre Robin sequence

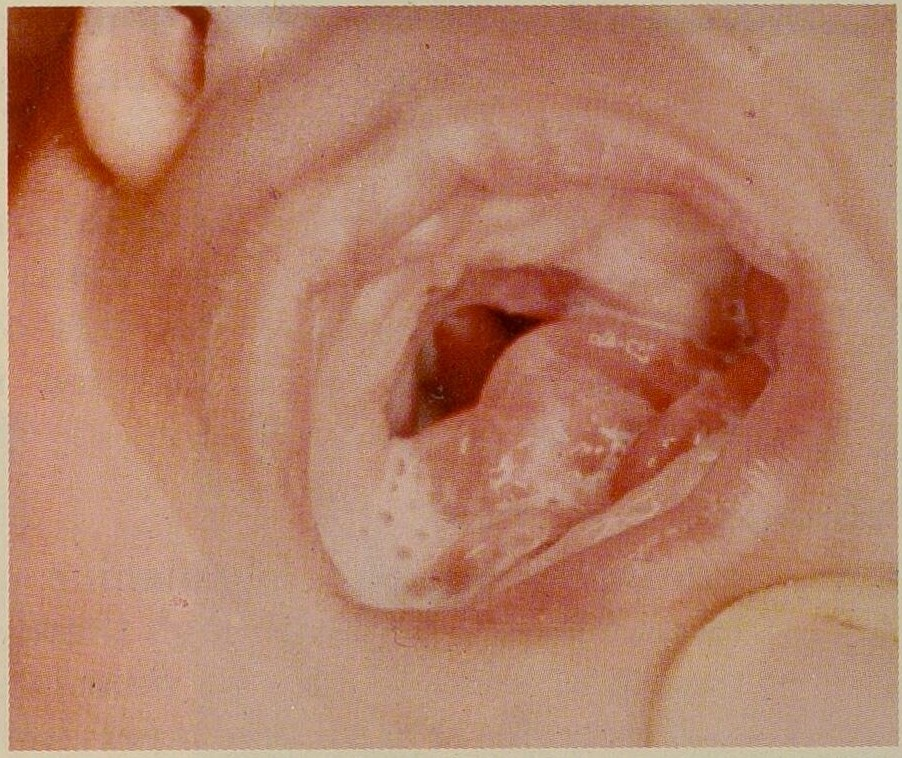
Cleft palate in Pierre Robin sequence

PRS is characterized by an unusually small mandible, posterior displacement or retraction of the tongue, and upper airway obstruction. Cleft palate (incomplete closure of the roof of the mouth) is present in the majority of patients. Hearing loss and speech difficulty are often associated with PRS.

== Causes ==
=== Mechanical basis ===
The physical craniofacial deformities of PRS may be the result of a mechanical problem in which intrauterine growth of certain facial structures is restricted, or mandibular positioning is altered. One theory for the etiology of PRS is that, early in the first trimester of gestation, some mechanical factor causes the neck to be abnormally flexed such that the tip of the mandible becomes compressed against the sternoclavicular joint. This compression of the chin interferes with development of the body of the mandible, resulting in micrognathia. The concave space formed by the body of the hypoplastic mandible is too small to accommodate the tongue, which continues to grow unimpeded. With nowhere else to go, the base of the tongue is downwardly displaced, which causes the tip of the tongue to be interposed between the left and right palatal shelves. This in turn may result in failure of the left and right palatal shelves to fuse in the midline to form the hard palate. This condition manifests as a cleft palate. Later in gestation (at around 12 to 14 weeks), extension of the neck of the fetus releases the pressure on the mandible, allowing it to grow normally from this point forward. At birth, however, the mandible is still much smaller (hypoplastic) than it would have been with normal development. After the child is born, the mandible continues to grow until the child reaches maturity.

=== Genetic basis ===
Alternatively, PRS may also be caused by a genetic disorder. In the case of PRS which is due to a genetic disorder, a hereditary basis has been postulated, but it usually occurs due to a de-novo mutation. Specifically, mutations at chromosome 2 (possibly at the GAD1 gene), chromosome 4, chromosome 11 (possibly at the PVRL1 gene), or chromosome 17 (possibly at the SOX9 gene or the KCNJ2 gene) have all been implicated in PRS. Some evidence suggests that genetic dysregulation of the SOX9 gene (which encodes the SOX-9 transcription factor) and/or the KCNJ2 gene (which encodes the Kir2.1 inward-rectifier potassium channel) impairs the development of certain facial structures, which can lead to PRS.

PRS may occur in isolation, but it is often part of an underlying disorder or syndrome. Disorders associated with PRS include Stickler syndrome, DiGeorge syndrome, fetal alcohol syndrome, Treacher Collins syndrome, and Patau syndrome.

== Diagnosis ==
PRS is generally diagnosed clinically shortly after birth. The infant usually has respiratory difficulty, especially when supine. The palatal cleft is often U-shaped and wider than that observed in other people with cleft palate.

== Management ==
The goals of treatment in infants with PRS focus upon breathing and feeding, and optimizing growth and nutrition despite the predisposition for breathing difficulties. If there is evidence of airway obstruction (snorty breathing, apnea, difficulty taking a breath, or drops in oxygen), then the infant should be placed in the sidelying or prone position, which helps bring the tongue base forward in many children. One study of 60 infants with PRS found that 63% of infants responded to prone positioning. Fifty-three percent of the infants in this study required some form of feeding assistance, either nasogastric tube or gastrostomy tube feedings (feeding directly into the stomach). In a separate study of 115 children with the clinical diagnosis of PRS managed at two different hospitals in Boston, respiratory distress was managed successfully in 56% without an operation (either by prone positioning, short-term intubation, or placement of a nasopharyngeal airway). In this study, gastrostomy tube feeding were placed in 42% of these infants due to feeding difficulties.

Gastroesophageal reflux (GERD) seems to be more prevalent in children with PRS. Because reflux of acidic contents in the posterior pharynx and upper airway can intensify the symptoms of PRS, specifically by worsening airway obstruction, it is important to maximize treatment for GER in children with PRS and reflux symptoms. Treatment may include upright positioning on a wedge (a tucker sling may be needed if the baby is in the prone position), small and frequent feedings (to minimize vomiting), and/or pharmacotherapy (such as proton pump inhibitors).

In nasopharyngeal cannulation (or placement of the nasopharyngeal airway or tube), the infant is fitted with a blunt-tipped length of surgical tubing (or an endotracheal tube fitted to the child), which is placed under direct visualization with a laryngoscope, being inserted into the nose and down the pharynx (or throat), ending just above the vocal cords. Surgical threads fitted through holes in the outside end of the tube are attached to the cheek with a special skin-like adhesive material called 'stomahesive', which is also wrapped around the outside end of the tube (but not over the opening at the end) to keep the tube in place. This tube or cannula, which itself acts as an airway, primarily acts as a sort of "splint" which maintains patency of the airway by keeping the tongue from falling back on the posterior pharyngeal wall and occluding the airway, therefore preventing airway obstruction, hypoxia and asphyxia. Nasopharyngeal airways are not available at every center; however, when available, nasopharyngeal cannulation should be favored over the other treatments mentioned in this article, as it is far less invasive; it allows the infant to feed without the further placement of a nasogastric tube. This treatment may be utilized for multiple months, until the jaw has grown enough so that the tongue assumes a more normal position in the mouth and airway (at birth, the jaws of some infants are so underdeveloped that only the tip of the tongue can be seen when viewed in the throat). Some institutions discharge the infant home with a nasopharyngeal tube in place.

Distraction osteogenesis (DO), also known as "Mandibular Distraction", is employed to address the abnormal smallness of one or both jaws in patients with PRS. By enlarging the lower jaw, this procedure advances the tongue, preventing it from obstructing the upper airway. The DO process starts with a preoperative assessment, during which doctors use three-dimensional imaging to identify the parts of the patient's facial skeleton that need realignment and determine the required magnitude and direction of distraction. They then select the most suitable distraction device or, if necessary, have custom devices made. Whenever possible, intraoral devices are used.

DO surgery starts with an osteotomy (surgical division or sectioning of bone) followed by the distraction device being placed under the skin and across the osteotomy. A few days later, the two ends of the bone are very gradually pulled apart through continual adjustments that are made to the device by the parents at home. The adjustments are made by turning a small screw that protrudes through the skin, usually at a rate of 1 mm per day. This gradual distraction leads to formation of new bone between the two ends. After the process is complete, the osteotomy is allowed to heal over a period of six to eight weeks. A small second surgery is then performed to remove the device.

The cleft palate is generally repaired between the ages of 6½ months and 2 years by a plastic surgeon, an oromaxillofacial surgeon, or an otorhinolaryngologist (ENT surgeon). In many centres there is now a cleft lip and palate team comprising these specialties, as well as a coordinator, a speech and language therapist, an orthodontist, sometimes a psychologist or other mental health specialist, an audiologist, and nursing staff. The glossoptosis and micrognathism generally do not require surgery, as they improve to some extent unaided, though the mandibular arch remains significantly smaller than average. In some cases jaw distraction is needed to aid in breathing and feeding. Lip-tongue attachment is performed in some centres, though its efficacy has been recently questioned.

A cleft palate (PRS or not) makes it difficult for individuals to articulate speech sounds, which may be due to the physical nature of cleft palate or the hearing loss that is associated with the condition. This is typically why a speech language pathologist and/or audiologist is involved with the patient. Hearing should be checked by an audiologist regularly and can be treated with hearing amplification such as hearing aids. Because middle ear effusion is found in many patients with PRS, tympanostomy (ventilation) tubes are often a treatment option.

One study with children showed that patients with PRS displayed a moderate and severe hearing loss most frequently. Planigraphs of temporal bones in these patients displayed an underdeveloped pneumatization of the mastoid bone in all PRS patients and in most patients with cleft palate (without PRS). There were no abnormalities of the inner or middle ear anatomy in patients with PRS.

== Prognosis ==
Children affected with PRS usually reach full development and size. However, it has been found internationally that children with PRS are often slightly below average size, raising concerns of incomplete development due to chronic hypoxia related to upper airway obstruction as well as lack of nutrition due to early feeding difficulties or the development of an oral aversion. However, the general prognosis is quite good once the initial breathing and feeding difficulties are overcome in infancy. Most PRS babies grow to lead a healthy and normal adult life.

The most important medical problems are difficulties in breathing and feeding. Affected infants very often need assistance with feeding, for example needing to stay in a lateral (on the side) or prone (on the tummy) position which helps bring the tongue forward and opens up the airway. Babies with a cleft palate will need a special cleft feeding device (such as the Haberman Feeder). Infants who are unable to take in enough calories by mouth to ensure growth may need supplementation with a nasogastric tube. This is related to the difficulty in forming a vacuum in the oral cavity related to the cleft palate, as well as breathing difficulties related to the posterior position of the tongue. Given the breathing difficulties that some babies with PRS face, they may require more calories to grow (as the work of breathing is like a form of exercise for the infant). Infants, when moderately to severely affected, may occasionally need nasopharyngeal cannulation, or placement of a nasopharyngeal tube to bypass the airway obstruction at the base of the tongue. in some places, children are discharged home with a nasopharyngeal tube for a period of time, and parents are taught how to maintain the tube. Sometimes endotracheal intubation or tracheostomy may be indicated to overcome upper respiratory obstruction. In some centers, a tongue lip adhesion is performed to bring the tongue forward, effectively opening up the airway. Mandibular distraction can be effective by moving the jaw forward to overcome the upper airway obstruction caused by the posterior positioning of the tongue. Given that some children with PRS will have Stickler syndrome, it is important that children with PRS be evaluated by an optometrist or ophthalmologist. Because the retinal detachment that sometimes accompanies Stickler syndrome is a leading cause of blindness in children, it is very important to recognize this diagnosis.

== Epidemiology ==
The prevalence of PRS is estimated to be 1 in 5,400 to 14,000 people.

Hearing loss has a higher incidence in those with cleft palate versus non-cleft palate. One study showed hearing loss in PRS at an average of 83%, versus an average of 60% of individuals with cleft without PRS. Another study with children showed that hearing loss was found more frequently with PRS (73.3%) compared to those with cleft and no PRS (58.1%). Hearing loss with PRS typically is a bilateral, conductive loss (affecting the outer/middle portion of the ear).

== History ==
The condition is named for the French dental surgeon Pierre Robin.

It is thought that Noel Rosa, one of the most famous and influential artists in the history of Brazilian music, had PRS, although others claim that his sunken chin was the result of a forceps accident during childbirth.

== See also ==
- Andersen–Tawil syndrome
- First arch syndrome
- Weissenbacher–Zweymüller syndrome

== Sources ==
- Handžić-Ćuk, Jadranka; Ćuk, Višeslav; Rišavi, Ranko; Katić, Vladimir; Katušić, Damir; Bagatin, Marijo; Štajner-Katušić, Smiljana; Gortan, Damir (September 1996). "Pierre Robin syndrome: characteristics of hearing loss, effect of age on hearing level and possibilities in therapy planning". The Journal of Laryngology & Otology. 110 (9): 830–835. doi:10.1017/S0022215100135108. ISSN 1748-5460.
- Handzic, J.; Bagatin, M.; Subotic, R. (1995-02-01). "Hearing Levels in Pierre Robin Syndrome". ResearchGate.
- "Pierre Robin Sequence (PRS)". Dell Children's Craniofacial Team of Texas. 2020.
- Mekdeci, David (3 April 2014). "Pierre Robin Syndrome - Birth Defect Fact Sheet". Birth Defect Research for Children.
