= Twist-related protein 1 =

Transcription factor protein

TWIST1

Identifiers
- Aliases: TWIST1, twist family bHLH transcription factor 1, ACS3, BPES2, BPES3, CRS, CRS1, SCS, TWIST, bHLHa38, CSO, SWCOS
- External IDs: OMIM: 601622; MGI: 98872; GeneCards: TWIST1
Available structures
PDB	Ortholog search: PDBe RCSB
PDB	List of PDB id codes 2MJV

Gene location (Human)
Chr.	Chromosome 7 (human)
Band	7p21.1	Start	19,020,991 bp
Band	7p21.1	End	19,117,636 bp

Gene location (Mouse)
Chr.	Chromosome 12 (mouse)
Band	12 A3|12 14.81 cM	Start	34,007,670 bp
Band	12 A3|12 14.81 cM	End	34,009,828 bp
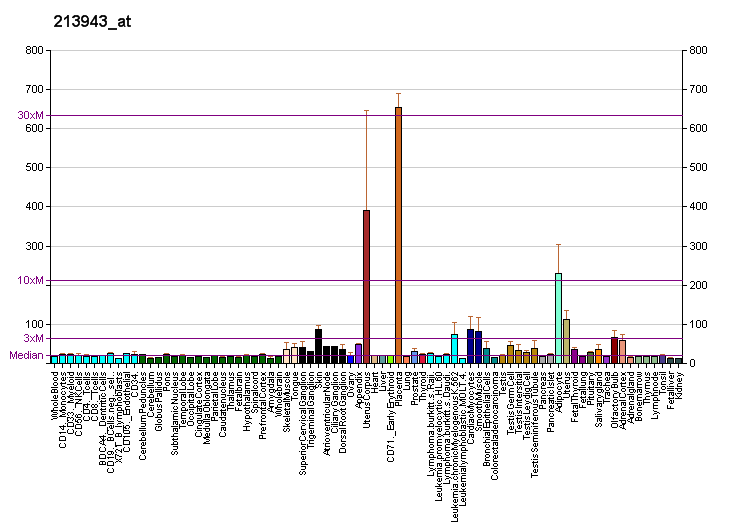
RNA expression pattern
Bgee	Human / Mouse (ortholog); Top expressed in: periodontal fiber; mucosa of paranasal sinus; oocyte; buccal mucosa cell; tendon of biceps brachii; pericardium; parietal pleura; lactiferous duct; placenta; stromal cell of endometrium / Top expressed in: maxillary prominence; mandibular prominence; desmocranium; hand; genital tubercle; allantois; endocardial cushion; dermis; abdominal wall; somatopleuric mesenchyme; More reference expression data
BioGPS	More reference expression data
Gene ontology
Molecular function	DNA binding; protein dimerization activity; protein homodimerization activity; protein domain specific binding; DNA-binding transcription factor activity; transcription factor binding; bHLH transcription factor binding; E-box binding; protein binding; protein heterodimerization activity; DNA-binding transcription factor activity, RNA polymerase II-specific
Cellular component	nucleus; nucleoplasm
Biological process	positive regulation of transcription regulatory region DNA binding; embryonic skeletal system morphogenesis; positive regulation of fatty acid beta-oxidation; roof of mouth development; cell differentiation; positive regulation of cell motility; regulation of transcription, DNA-templated; negative regulation of molecular function; ossification; rhythmic process; positive regulation of epithelial cell proliferation; negative regulation of striated muscle tissue development; regulation of bone mineralization; aortic valve morphogenesis; negative regulation of cell differentiation; cardiac neural crest cell migration involved in outflow tract morphogenesis; cellular response to growth factor stimulus; positive regulation of monocyte chemotactic protein-1 production; muscle organ development; embryonic digit morphogenesis; negative regulation of apoptotic process; neuron migration; in utero embryonic development; negative regulation of transcription by RNA polymerase II; outer ear morphogenesis; eyelid development in camera-type eye; mitral valve morphogenesis; positive regulation of DNA-templated transcription, initiation; positive regulation of epithelial to mesenchymal transition; negative regulation of DNA-binding transcription factor activity; transcription, DNA-templated; negative regulation of osteoblast differentiation; positive regulation of angiogenesis; hindlimb morphogenesis; negative regulation of phosphatidylinositol 3-kinase signaling; cranial suture morphogenesis; odontogenesis; endocardial cushion morphogenesis; negative regulation of double-strand break repair; multicellular organism development; cardiac neural crest cell development involved in outflow tract morphogenesis; neural tube closure; positive regulation of gene expression; negative regulation of DNA damage response, signal transduction by p53 class mediator; negative regulation of skeletal muscle tissue development; embryonic limb morphogenesis; negative regulation of oxidative phosphorylation uncoupler activity; osteoblast differentiation; positive regulation of tumor necrosis factor production; cell proliferation involved in heart valve development; embryonic cranial skeleton morphogenesis; negative regulation of tumor necrosis factor production; negative regulation of peroxisome proliferator activated receptor signaling pathway; positive regulation of endocardial cushion to mesenchymal transition involved in heart valve formation; negative regulation of histone acetylation; embryonic camera-type eye formation; bone development; embryonic forelimb morphogenesis; cellular response to hypoxia; positive regulation of transcription by RNA polymerase II; negative regulation of cellular senescence; embryonic hindlimb morphogenesis; negative regulation of transcription, DNA-templated; cytokine-mediated signaling pathway
Sources:Amigo / QuickGO
Orthologs
Databases	NCBI: entry; OMA: entry
Species	Human	Mouse
Entrez	7291	22160
Ensembl	ENSG00000122691	ENSMUSG00000035799
UniProt	Q15672	P26687
RefSeq (mRNA)	NM_000474	NM_011658
RefSeq (protein)	NP_000465	NP_035788
Location (UCSC)	Chr 7: 19.02 – 19.12 Mb	Chr 12: 34.01 – 34.01 Mb
PubMed search
- Wikidata
View/Edit Human	View/Edit Mouse

Twist-related protein 1 (TWIST1) also known as class A basic helix–loop–helix protein 38 (bHLHa38) is a basic helix-loop-helix transcription factor that in humans is encoded by the TWIST1 gene.

== Function ==
Basic helix-loop-helix (bHLH) transcription factors have been implicated in cell lineage determination and differentiation. The protein encoded by this gene is a bHLH transcription factor and shares similarity with another bHLH transcription factor, Dermo1 (a.k.a. TWIST2). The strongest expression of this mRNA is in placental tissue; in adults, mesodermally derived tissues express this mRNA preferentially.

Twist1 is thought to regulate osteogenic lineage.

== Clinical significance ==
Mutations in the TWIST1 gene are associated with Saethre–Chotzen syndrome, breast cancer, and Sézary syndrome.

=== Craniosynostosis ===
TWIST1 mutations are involved in a number of craniosynostosis presentations. It can present in nonsyndromic forms (isolated scaphocephaly, right unicoronal synostosis, and turricephaly), but also in syndromic forms such as:

- Acrocephalosyndactyly type 1 (Apert syndrome) (primary FGFR2)
- Beare-Stevenson cutis gyrata syndrome (primary FGFR2)
- Crouzon syndrome (primary FGFR2)
- Crouzon syndrome-acanthosis nigricans syndrome (primary FGFR3)
- Jackson-Weiss syndrome (primary FGFR1 or FGFR2)
- Muenke syndrome (primary FGFR3)
- Pfeiffer syndrome (primary FGFR1 or FGFR2)

=== As an oncogene ===
Twist plays an essential role in cancer metastasis. Over-expression of Twist or methylation of its promoter is common in metastatic carcinomas. Hence targeting Twist has a great promise as a cancer therapeutic. In cooperation with N-Myc, Twist-1 acts as an oncogene in several cancers including neuroblastoma.

Twist is activated by a variety of signal transduction pathways, including Akt, signal transducer and activator of transcription 3 (STAT3), mitogen-activated protein kinase, Ras, and Wnt signaling. Activated Twist upregulates N-cadherin and downregulates E-cadherin, which are the hallmarks of EMT. Moreover, Twist plays an important role in some physiological processes involved in metastasis, like angiogenesis, invadopodia, extravasation, and chromosomal instability. Twist also protects cancer cells from apoptotic cell death. In addition, Twist is responsible for the maintenance of cancer stem cells and the development of chemotherapy resistance. Twist1 is extensively studied for its role in head- and neck cancers. Here and in epithelial ovarian cancer, Twist1 has been shown to be involved in evading apoptosis, making the tumour cells resistant against platinum-based chemotherapeutic drugs like cisplatin. Moreover, Twist1 has been shown to be expressed under conditions of hypoxia, corresponding to the observation that hypoxic cells respond less to chemotherapeutic drugs.

Another process in which Twist 1 is involved is tumour metastasis. The underlying mechanism is not completely understood, but it has been implicated in the upregulation of matrix metalloproteinases and inhibition of TIMP.

Recently, targeting Twist has gained interest as a target for cancer therapeutics. The inactivation of Twist by small interfering RNA or chemotherapeutic approach has been demonstrated in vitro. Moreover, several inhibitors which are antagonistic to the upstream or downstream molecules of Twist signaling pathways have also been identified.

== Interactions ==
Twist transcription factor has been shown to interact with EP300, TCF3 and PCAF.

== See also ==
- Transcription factor
- TWIST2
