= Metopic ridge =

Variant in human skulls

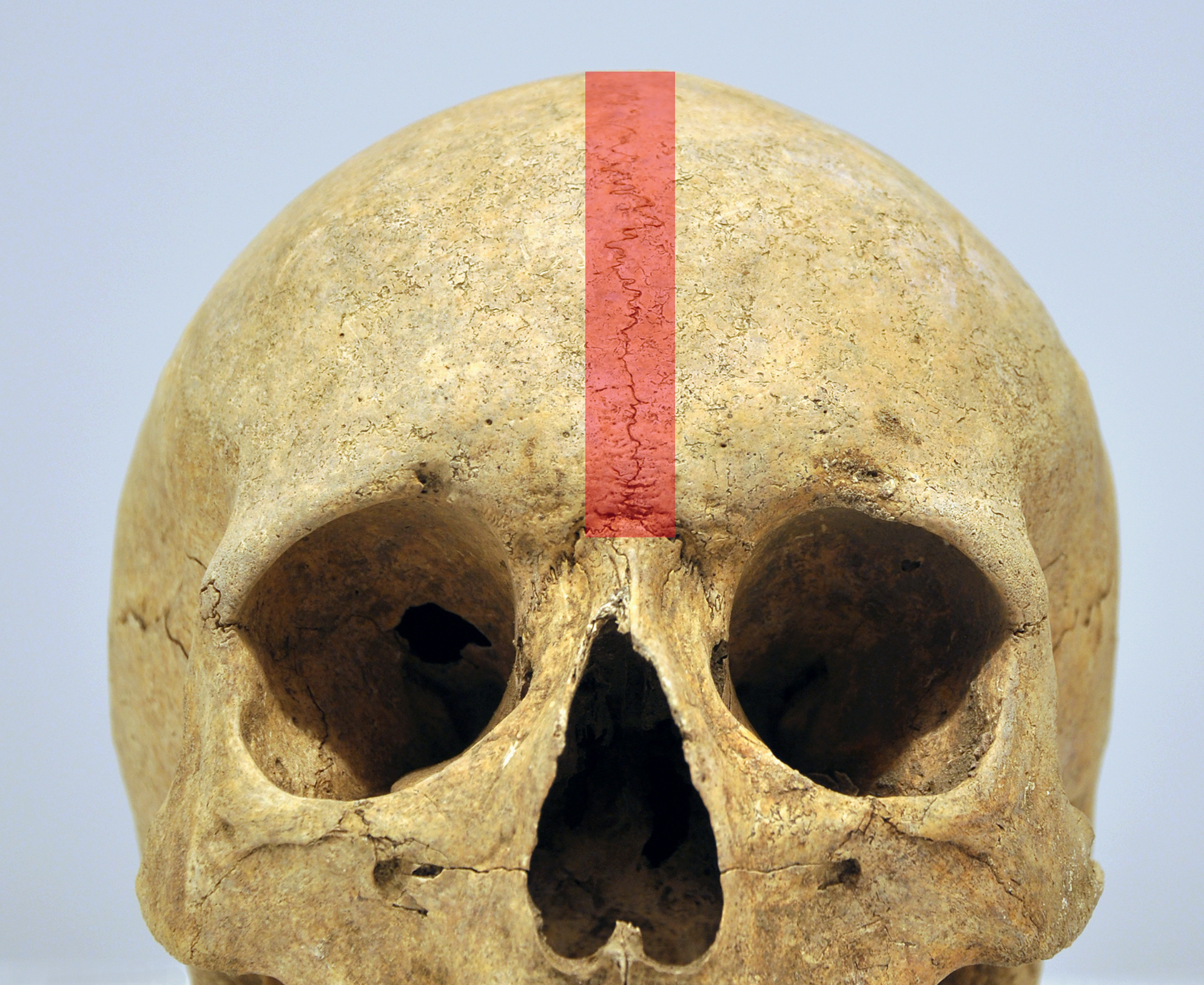
Frontal view with metopic suture (red) on a normal adult skull

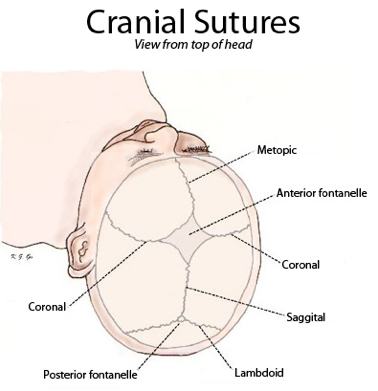
Cranial sutures viewed from top of head

A metopic ridge is a condition with a palpable vertical ridge on the forehead of the skull along the metopic suture line, which runs along the from the top of the forehead down to between the eyebrows or middle of the nose. It is sometimes called benign metopic ridge when differentiated from trigonocephaly ("triangle shaped forehead") which is also caused by premature closure of the metopic suture.

It is usually somewhat subjectively determined where the diagnostic threshold lies between metopic ridge and the more severe trigonocephaly, but machine learning algorithms have been demonstrated to classify patients consistent with classifications done manually by experts.

== Signs and symptoms ==
A benign metopic ridge presents itself as a slight or noticeable ridge in the metopic suture (also called frontal suture), that is running down the middle of a child's forehead. The child otherwise has a mostly normally shaped forehead and head. A metopic ridge is usually a benign and isolated finding. In most cases, a metopic ridge does not affect brain development or cause any functional issues. Usually the child does not show any abnormal mood or general condition like crying a lot or showing prolonged discomfort, and is perceived as present and normal.

== Causes ==
Metopic ridges are usually caused by a birth defect called craniosynostosis, more specifically metopic synostosis, but can also be associated with other congenital skeletal defects. Both metopic ridge and trigonocephaly involve premature fusion of the metopic suture. Like with trigonocephaly, there is no single proven cause for metopic ridge, and there is often no identifiable reason.

== Diagnosis ==
In metopic ridge the fusion is not severe enough to cause significant changes in the shape of the skull except a slight bulge along the metopic ridge. It is often differentiated from trigonocephaly, which is more serious, affects the shape of the forehead and head more, and requires medical intervention to avoid danger of significant impact on the child's brain development.

Medical experts on craniosynostosis (for example a pediatric craniofacial specialist) should be consulted to distinguish between the two. Both by visual inspection and with CT scans it is easier to distinguish between metopic ridge and trigonocephaly as the child gets older, but early classification is important in case the diagnosis is trigonocephaly, which requires surgery. Early diagnosis is beneficial, since surgery for trigonocephaly can be done endoscopic between 4 and 6 months, or as open surgery between 6 and 12 months. After about 12 months of age the skull (like the skeleton in the rest of the body) hardens, and becomes less malleable, and decreases its tendency to close any open sutures after surgery (even though it still has a much higher likelihood of closing compared to an adult).

Benign metopic ridges should show normal intracranial pressure, and may be inspected non-invasively by a pediatrician by slight palpation of the fontanelle. A basic eye exam looking for papilledema can also be performed.

== Treatment ==
Benign metopic ridge usually does not require treatment. It is often considered a normal variant, and may not require treatment if there are no other symptoms or concerns. In cases that are purely cosmetic with a small ridge on the forehead, observation is the recommended approach.

Surgical intervention is not needed for benign metopic ridge, however it is needed if the diagnose is trigonocephaly.

Non-surgical options are generally limited. Methods such as molding via helmet therapy for shaping a baby's head over time is not commonly used for benign metopic ridge, but is used for plagiocephaly, brachycephaly or scaphocephaly.

== Prognosis ==
The metopic ridges may become less cosmetically prominent during the first few years of life as the head grows and facial features develop. How much a metopic ridge flattens out and when can vary from child to child. It can be monitored over time with regular check-ups with a pediatrician. By the time a child reaches the age of about 6 years the ridge might be significantly less noticeable or even barely detectable. In some cases the ridge can remain prominent into adulthood, which can cause concern in patients about appearance (not to be confused with persistent metopic suture).

== Epidemiology ==
"Benign metopic ridge from a normal physiological of closure can be present in 10–25% of infants (Cohen and MacLean, 2000)".

== See also ==
- Plagiocephaly, asymmetric distortion of the skull, with flattening of one side
