= Shprintzen–Goldberg syndrome =

Congenital medical condition

- Other names: Marfanoid craniosynostosis syndrome
- Shprintzen–Goldberg syndrome is inherited in an autosomal dominant manner

Shprintzen–Goldberg syndrome is a congenital multiple-anomaly syndrome that has craniosynostosis, multiple abdominal hernias, cognitive impairment, and other skeletal malformations as key features. Several reports have linked the syndrome to a mutation in the FBN1 gene, but these cases do not resemble those initially described in the medical literature in 1982 by Shprintzen and Goldberg, and Greally et al. in 1998 failed to find a causal link to FBN1. At this time, the cause of Shprintzen–Goldberg syndrome has been identified as a mutation in the gene SKI located on chromosome 1 at the p36 locus. The syndrome is rare with fewer than 50 cases described in the medical literature to date.

== Signs and symptoms ==
People with Shprintzen-Goldberg syndrome can experience a range of symptoms that vary in severity. Due to craniosynostosis, people with SGS may have a long and narrow head, wide spaced protruding eyes that may slant downwards, a high and narrow palate, a high and prominent forehead, a small lower jaw, and low-set posteriorly-rotated ears. Some other skeletal abnormalities people with SGS may experience include joint hypermobility, clubfoot, scoliosis, camptodactyly, arachnodactyly, long limbs, and a chest which appears to sink in or stick out. Other symptoms that may be experienced include brain abnormalities (e.g.,hydrocephalus), developmental delays, intellectual disability, gastrointestinal problems (e.g., constipation, gastroparesis, etc.), abdominal or umbilical hernias, easily bruised skin, trouble breathing, and hypotonia. Some cardiac issues which are occasionally seen in people with SGS include aortic aneurysm, aortic regurgitation, aortic root dilation, mitral valve regurgitation, and mitral valve prolapse.

== See also ==
- Craniosynostosis
