= Flat forehead =

- Other names: Flattened forehead
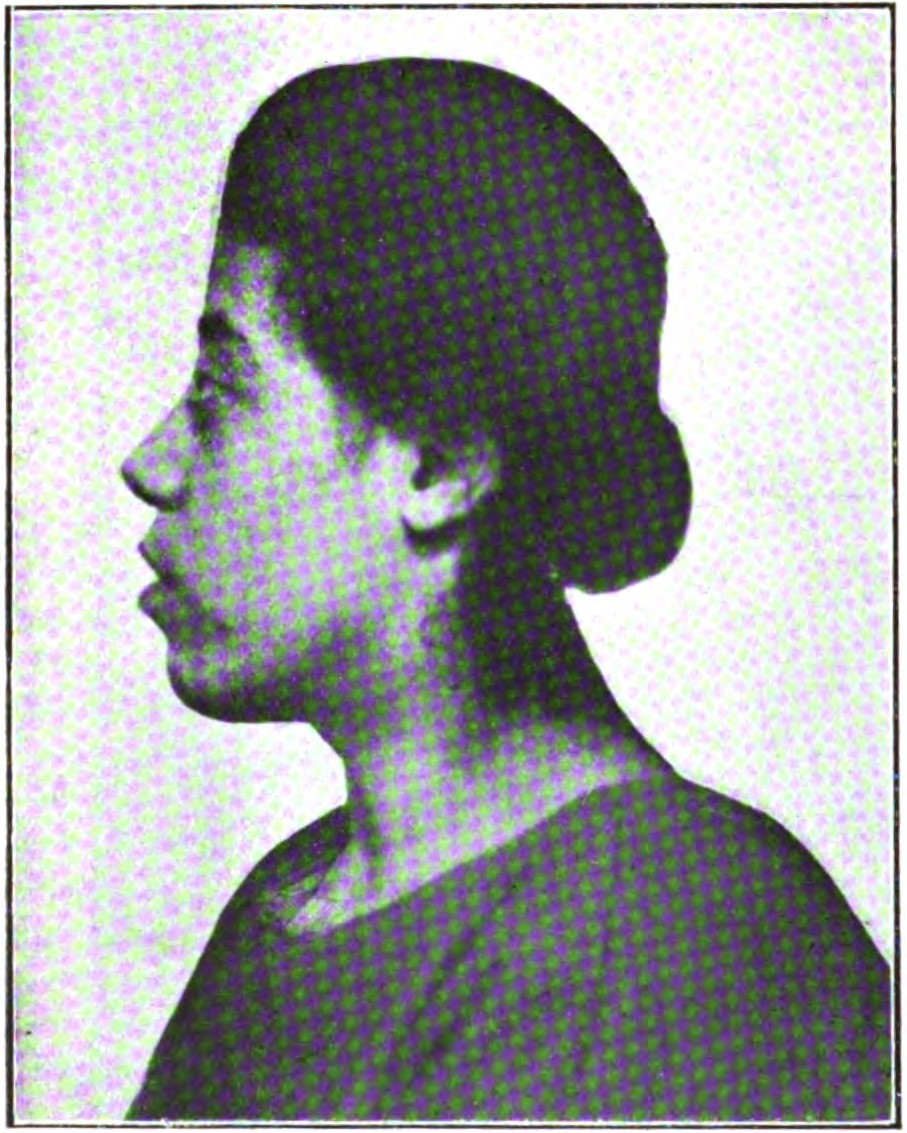
- Flat forehead with oxycephaly in Saethre–Chotzen syndrome

Flat forehead is a dysmorphic feature in which the surface of the forehead is unusually flat.

== Conditions ==
Flat forehead is seen in the following conditions and syndromes:

- Baller–Gerold syndrome
- Cataract–growth hormone deficiency–sensory neuropathy–sensorineural hearing loss–skeletal dysplasia syndrome
- COG7 congenital disorder of glycosylation
- Craniosynostosis and dental anomalies
- Ehlers–Danlos syndrome, musculocontractural type
- Ehlers–Danlos syndrome, spondylodysplastic type, 1
- Intellectual developmental disorder 59
- Saethre–Chotzen syndrome
- Temple–Baraitser syndrome
- Worth disease

== See also ==
- Artificial cranial deformation
