= Crouzonodermoskeletal syndrome =

- Other names: Crouzon syndrome with acanthosis nigricans

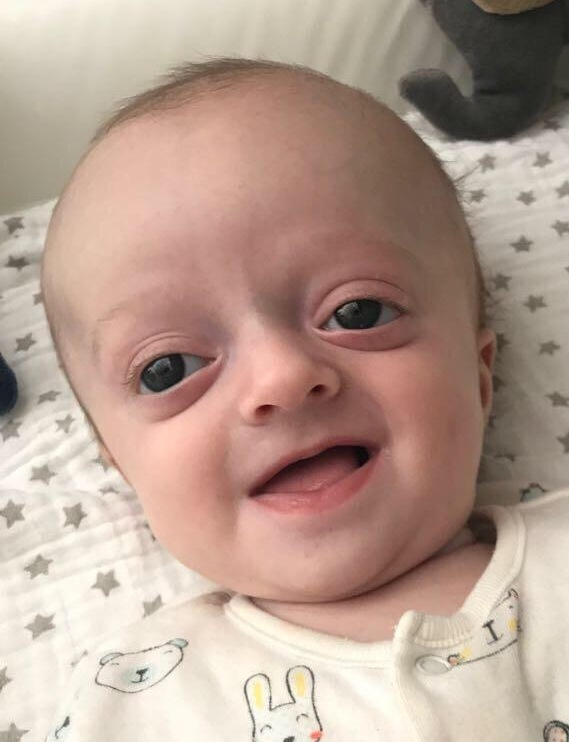
Baby with Crouzon Syndrome

Crouzonodermoskeletal syndrome (more commonly Crouzono-dermo-skeletal syndrome) is a disorder characterized by the premature joining of certain bones of the skull (craniosynostosis) during development and a skin condition called acanthosis nigricans.

Some of the signs and symptoms of Crouzonodermoskeletal syndrome are similar to those seen with Crouzon syndrome. They include prematurely fused skull bones, which affect the shape of the head and face; wide-set, bulging eyes due to shallow eye sockets; eyes that do not point in the same direction (strabismus); a small, beaked nose; and an underdeveloped upper jaw. People with these conditions are generally of normal intelligence.

Several features distinguish Crouzonodermoskeletal syndrome from Crouzon syndrome. People with Crouzonodermoskeletal syndrome have acanthosis nigricans, a skin condition characterized by thick, dark, velvety skin in body folds and creases, including the neck and underarms. In addition, subtle changes may be seen in the bones of the spine (vertebrae). Noncancerous growths called cementomas may develop in the jaw during young adulthood. Crouzonodermoskeletal syndrome is rare; the condition is seen in about 1 per million people.

== Genetics ==
Mutations in the FGFR3 gene cause Crouzonodermoskeletal syndrome. The protein made by the FGFR3 gene is a receptor that plays a role in the development and maintenance of bone and brain tissue. Researchers do not know how a mutation in FGFR3 leads to the characteristic features of this disorder, but changes in the receptor appear to disrupt the normal development of bones in the skull and affect skin pigmentation.

This condition is inherited in an autosomal dominant pattern, which means one copy of the altered gene in each cell is sufficient to cause the disorder.

In some cases, an affected person inherits the mutation from one affected parent. Other cases may result from new mutations in the gene. These cases occur in people with no history of the disorder in their family.
