= Metopism =

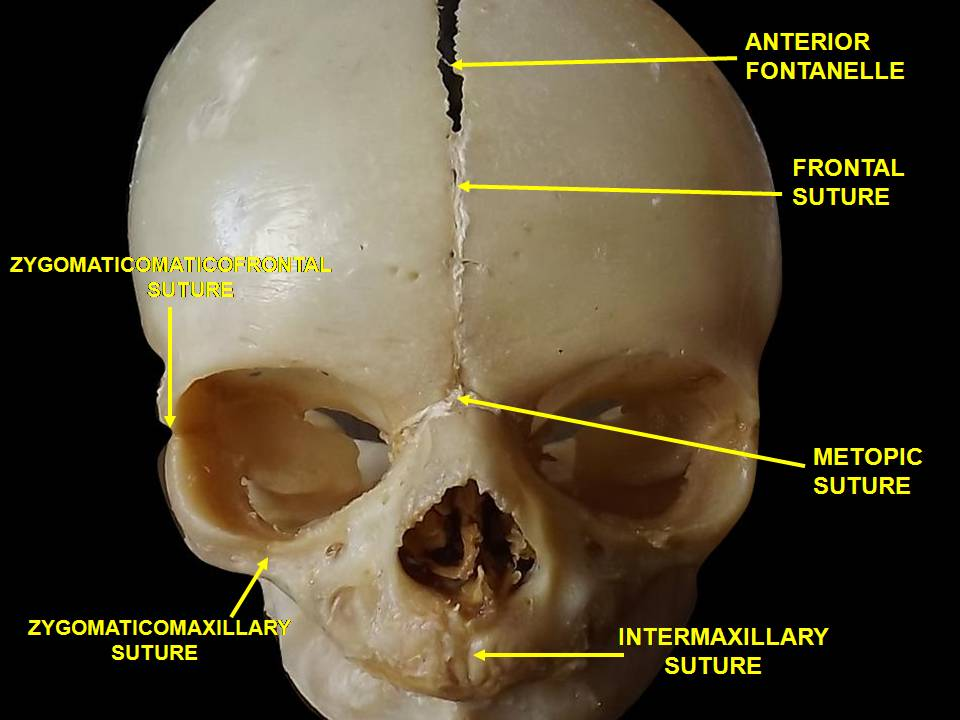
- Baby skull and metopic (frontal) suture

Metopism is the condition of having a persistent metopic suture, or persistence of the frontal metopic suture in the adult human skull. Metopism is the opposite of craniosynostosis. The main factor of the metopic suture is to increase the volume of the anterior cranial fossa. The frontal bone includes the forehead, and the roofs of the orbits (bony sockets) of the eyes. The frontal bone has vertical portion (squama) and horizontal portion (orbital part). Some adults have a metopic or frontal suture in the vertical portion. During the uterine period, there is a membranous tissue between the right and left halves of the frontal bones of the fetus. On each half, a primary ossification center appears about the end of the second month of the fetus. The primary ossification center extends to form the corresponding half of the vertical part (squama) and horizontal part (orbital part) of the frontal bone.

At birth the frontal bone contains two portions, separated by the metopic (frontal) suture. Metopism is the condition of having a persistent metopic suture. The metopic suture is typically obliterated, except at its lower part, by the eighth year, but infrequently persists throughout life. There is no single proven cause of metopism. Its occurrence, when severe, can be associated with visional, learning, and behavioral problems. Some cases do not require any treatment, but surgical repair can be offered. Treatment teams include neurosurgeons, plastic surgeons, neurologists, oral and maxillofacial surgeons, audiologists, neuroscience nursing professionals, speech therapists, physical therapists, dentists, otolaryngologists, ophthalmologists, psychiatrists, psychologists and social workers.

== Gallery ==
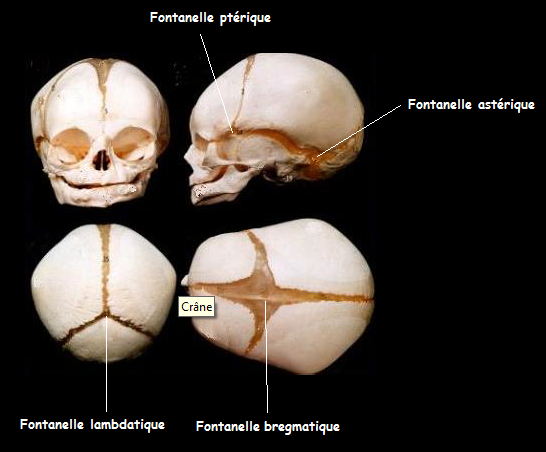
Infant frontal bones have two portions

== Sources ==
- Online version of Gray's Anatomy — The complete 20th U.S. edition of Gray's Anatomy of the Human Body, published in 1918. NB: This is the most recent American version that is in the public domain.
- First edition of Gray's Anatomy, 1858 (direct PDF link)
