= Jackson–Weiss syndrome =

- Other names: Craniosynostosis, midfacial hypoplasia, and foot abnormalities
- Jackson–Weiss syndrome is inherited in an autosomal dominant pattern
- Symptoms: Hypertelorism
- Causes: Mutations in the FGFR2 gene
- Diagnostic method: Genetic testing
- Treatment: Surgery

Jackson–Weiss syndrome (JWS) is a genetic disorder characterized by foot abnormalities and the premature fusion of certain bones of the skull (craniosynostosis), which prevents further growth of the skull and affects the shape of the head and face. This genetic disorder can also sometimes cause intellectual disability and crossed eyes. It was characterized in 1976.

== Signs and symptoms ==
Many of the characteristic facial features (among other) of Jackson–Weiss syndrome result from the premature fusion of the skull bones. The following are some of the more common, such as:

- Preaxial foot polydactyl
- Tarsal synostosis
- Frontal bossing
- Proptosis
- Craniosynostosis
- Midfacial hypoplasia
- Acrocephaly
- Flat occiput
- Ocular hypertelorism
- Downslanted palpebral fissures
- Ptosis
- Strabismus
- Flat nasal bridge
- Maxillary hypoplasia
- Cleft palate
- Malformed ears

== Genetics ==
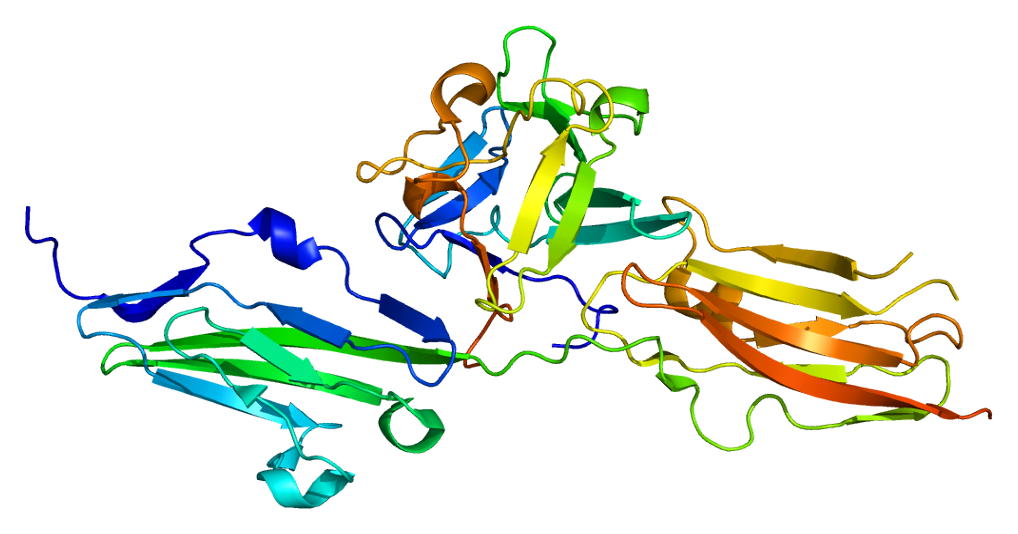
Fibroblast growth factor receptor 2

Mutations in the FGFR2 gene cause Jackson–Weiss syndrome. The FGFR2 gene produces a protein called fibroblast growth factor receptor 2, which occurs in chromosome number 10. Among its multiple functions, this protein signals immature cells to become bone cells in a developing embryo. A mutation in a specific part of the FGFR2 gene alters the protein and causes prolonged signaling, which promotes the premature fusion of bones in the skull and feet, this condition is inherited in an autosomal dominant pattern. Autosomal dominant means one copy of the altered gene in each cell is sufficient to cause the disorder.

== Diagnosis ==
The diagnosis of Jackson–Weiss syndrome in an individual suspected of having the condition is done via the following:

- Genetic testing
- Clinical presentation

=== Differential diagnosis ===
The DDx for this condition includes metopic synostosis, as well as Lambdoida synostosis.

== Treatment ==
Hydrocephalus

Treatment for Jackson–Weiss syndrome can be done through surgery for some facial features and feet. Secondary complications such as hydrocephalus or cognitive impairment, can be averted via prompt surgery.

== Epidemiology ==
In terms of epidemiology, Jackson–Weiss syndrome is a rare genetic disorder; the overall contribution of FGFR mutation to the condition is not clear.
