= Baller–Gerold syndrome =

- Other names: Craniosynostosis-radial aplasia syndrome, Craniosynostosis with radial defects
- The inheritance pattern of Baller-Gerold Syndrome
- Frequency: fewer than 1 per million people

Baller–Gerold syndrome (BGS) is a rare genetic syndrome that involves premature fusion of the skull bones and malformations of facial, forearm and hand bones. The symptoms of Baller–Gerold syndrome overlap with features of other genetic disorders, such as Rothmund–Thomson syndrome and RAPADILINO syndrome. The prevalence of BGS is unknown, as there have only been a few reported cases, but it is estimated to be less than 1 in a million. The name of the syndrome comes from the researchers Baller and Gerold who discovered the first three cases.

== Signs and symptoms ==
The coronal suture

The most common and defining features of BGS are craniosynostosis and radial ray deficiency. The observations of these features allow for a diagnosis of BGS to be made, as these symptoms characterize the syndrome. Craniosynostosis involves the pre-mature fusion of bones in the skull. The coronal craniosynostosis that is commonly seen in patients with BGS results in the fusion of the skull along the coronal suture. Because of the changes in how the bones of the skull are connected together, people with BGS will have an abnormally shaped head, known as brachycephaly. Features commonly seen in those with coronal craniosynostosis are bulging eyes, shallow eye pockets, and a prominent forehead. Radial ray deficiency is another clinical characteristic of those with BGS, and results in the under-development (hypoplasia) or the absence (aplasia) of the bones in the arms and the hands. These bones include the radius, the carpal bones associated with the radius and the thumb. Oligodactyly can also result from radial ray deficiency, meaning that someone with BGS may have fewer than five fingers. Radial ray deficiency that is associated with syndromes (such as BGS) occurs bi-laterally, affecting both arms.

Some of the other clinical characteristics sometimes associated with this disorder are growth retardation and poikiloderma. Although the presentation of BGS may differ between individuals, these characteristics are often observed. People with BGS may have stunted growth, short stature and misshapen kneecaps. Poikiloderma may be present in people with this syndrome, meaning that their skin may have regions of hyperpigmentation and hypopigmentation, or regions where the skin is missing (atrophy).

== Genetics ==
Baller–Gerold syndrome is caused by a mutation in the RECQL4 gene found on chromosome 8p24. Molecular genetic tests used to identify mutations in the RECQL4 gene include targeted variant analysis and sequence analysis of the entire coding region of the gene. These methods look for changes in the sequence encoding RECQL4, as having a deleterious mutation in the gene will change the protein and disrupt its usual function. RECQL4 is a gene that encodes a DNA helicase in the RecQ helicase family. Helicases are involved with unwinding DNA in preparation for DNA replication and repair.

Baller–Gerold syndrome is inherited in an autosomal recessive pattern of inheritance, meaning that an affected child gets one mutant allele from each parent to produce the syndrome. A carrier is someone who has one mutant allele but does not does have any symptoms. If both parents are carriers, there is a 25% chance the child will have BGS. There is also a 50% chance the child will have one mutant copy (be a carrier) and be asymptomatic and a 25% chance the child will be asymptomatic and not a carrier. In order for someone to have BGS, they need to have two mutant copies of the gene. Adults may pursue genetic counselling to understand the syndrome, as well as the risks and choices regarding family planning.

== Treatment ==
While there is no cure for BGS, symptoms can be treated as they arise. Surgery shortly after birth can repair craniosynostosis, as well as defects in the hand to create a functional grasp. There are risks associated with untreated craniosynostosis, therefore surgery is often needed to separate and reshape the bones. Since patients with a RECQL4 mutation may be at an increased risk of developing cancer, surveillance is recommended.
