= List of conditions with craniosynostosis =

List of medical conditions involving craniosynostosis

Craniosynostosis, a condition in which the sutures of the head (joints between the bones of the skull) prematurely fuse and subsequently alter the shape of the head, is seen in many diseases and disorders. This can range from minor single-suture craniosynostosis to major multisutural craniosynostosis, and is highly variable across different clinical presentations. Macrocephaly and microcephaly are also observed in many of these conditions. Craniosynostosis may not be universally present in all patients diagnosed with the conditions below.

== 0-9 ==
Condition	Image	Impacted sutures	Cranial shape	Notes	Sources
3MC syndrome				Spectrum of 4 syndromes: Carnevale, Mingarelli, Malpuech, and Michels.	
8q22.1 microdeletion syndrome				Microcephaly	
15q overgrowth syndrome				Macrocephaly; not seen in all cases.	

== A ==
Condition	Image	Impacted sutures	Cranial shape	Notes	Sources
Acrocephalopolydactyly			Oxycephaly		
Acrocephalosyndactyly type I		Coronal, sagittal	Acrobrachycephaly, brachycephaly, brachyturricephaly	Characterized by syndactyly of fingers and toes; usually known as Apert syndrome.	
Acrocephalosyndactyly type IV			Oxycephaly	Usually known as Goodman syndrome; now classified as Carpenter syndrome variant.	
Acrocephalopolysyndactyly type III				Usually known as Sakati-Nyhan-Tisdale syndrome.	
Acrocraniofacial dysostosis			Oxycephaly		
Adducted thumb				Microcephaly	
Agammaglobulinemia-microcephaly-craniosynostosis-severe dermatitis syndrome				Microcephaly	
Aneurysm-osteoarthritis syndrome				Usually classified as LDS type 1C.	
Antley-Bixler syndrome		Coronal	Brachycephaly, cloverleaf skull	Macrocephaly or microcephaly	
Aprosencephaly cerebellar dysgenesis					
Arthrogryposis, cleft palate, craniosynostosis, and impaired intellectual development (ACCIID)			Plagiocephaly, trigonocephaly		
Aurocephalosyndactyly					
Autosomal dominant intellectual disability-craniofacial anomalies-cardiac defects syndrome			Plagiocephaly	Microcephaly	
Autosomal recessive osteopetrosis (TCIRG1)				Macrocephaly	

== B ==
Condition	Image	Impacted sutures	Cranial shape	Notes	Sources
Baller-Gerold syndrome		Sagittal, coronal	Brachyturricephaly		
Beare-Stevenson cutis gyrata syndrome			Cloverleaf skull		
Bent bone dysplasia syndrome		Coronal			
Bonnemann-Meinecke-Reich syndrome				Described in 2 sets of siblings in 2 different families; last reported 1991.	
Brachyphalangy, polydactyly, and tibial aplasia/hypoplasia				Microcephaly	

== C ==
Condition	Image	Impacted sutures	Cranial shape	Notes	Sources
Cardiocranial syndrome, Pfeiffer type		Sagittal			
Carpenter syndrome		Coronal, sagittal	Brachycephaly, oxycephaly, trigonocephaly	Also classified as Acrocephalopolysyndactyly type II.	
CEBALID syndrome			Brachycephaly, dolichocephaly, plagiocephaly, platystencephaly, turricephaly		
Cerebrooculonasal syndrome			Brachycephaly	Macrocephaly	
Char syndrome					
Childhood hypophosphatasia			Dolichocephaly		
Chromosome 5p13 duplication syndrome			Brachycephaly, turricephaly	Macrocephaly	
Cloverleaf skull syndrome			Cloverleaf skull	Usually considered to be an isolated form.	
Cloverleaf skull-asphyxiating thoracic dysplasia syndrome			Cloverleaf skull	Last case reported in 1987.	
Cloverleaf skull-multiple congenital anomalies syndrome			Cloverleaf skull	Seen in 3 siblings from 1 family.	
Contractures, pterygia, and spondylocarpotarsal fusion syndrome				Microcephaly	
Cole-Carpenter syndrome		Coronal	Turricephaly	Macrocephaly	
Cranioectodermal dysplasia		Metopic, sagittal	Cloverleaf skull, dolichocephaly/scaphocephaly, plagiocephaly	Macrocephaly	
Craniofacial dysmorphism, skeletal anomalies, and impaired intellectual development			Brachycephaly	Macrocephaly or microcephaly	
Craniofacial dyssynostosis		Lambdoid (bilateral), sagittal (posterior)	Brachycephaly, brachyturricephaly		
Craniofacial dysplasia - osteopenia syndrome			Brachycephaly		
Craniofrontonasal dysplasia-Poland anomaly syndrome				Less than 10 known cases described.	
Craniofrontonasal syndrome		Coronal	Brachycephaly		
Craniorhiny			Oxycephaly/turricephaly		
Craniosynostosis, Boston type (MSX2)		Coronal	Brachycephaly, brachyturricephaly, trigonocephaly, turricephaly	Usually considered nonsyndromic.	
Craniosynostosis (ALX4)				Susceptible cause; usually considered nonsyndromic.	
Craniosynstosis (ZIC1)			Brachycephaly, plagiocephaly, turricephaly	Can also feature delayed suture closure, microcephaly; usually considered nonsyndromic.	
Craniosynostosis (SMAD6)				Usually considered nonsyndromic.	
Craniosynostosis (TWIST1)		Coronal (right unicoronal), sagittal	Dolichocephaly/scaphocephaly, oxycephaly/turricephaly	Usually considered nonsyndromic.	
Craniosynostosis (TCF12)		Coronal, sagittal		Usually considered nonsyndromic.	
Craniosynostosis (ERF)		Coronal, metopic, pansynostosis, sagittal		Macrocephaly; usually considered nonsyndromic.	
Craniosynostosis and dental anomalies		Coronal, metopic, sagittal	Brachycephaly, dolichocephaly/scaphocephaly, oxycephaly/turricephaly, trigonocephaly		
Craniosynostosis with anomalies of the cranial base and digits					
Craniosynostosis with ocular abnormalities and hallucal defects					
Craniosynostosis, Adelaide type					
Craniosynostosis, Philadelphia type		Sagittal	Dolichocephaly	Variable sagittal craniosynostosis penetrance.	
Craniosynostosis-anal anomalies-porokeratosis syndrome		Coronal, sagittal	Brachycephaly		
Craniosynostosis-Dandy-Walker malformation-hydrocephalus syndrome		Sagittal	Dolichocephaly		
Craniosynostosis-fibular aplasia syndrome					
Craniosynostosis-hydrocephalus-Arnold-Chiari malformation type I-radioulnar synostosis syndrome		Sagittal	Scaphocephaly		
Craniosynostosis-intellectual disability syndrome of 51N and Gettig					
Craniosynostosis-intellectual disability-clefting syndrome				Microcephaly	
Craniosynostosis-intracranial calcifications syndrome				Microcephaly	
Craniotelencephalic dysplasia					
Crouzon syndrome		Coronal, sagittal	Brachycephaly	Also classified as Acrocephalosyndactyly type II.	
Crouzon syndrome-acanthosis nigricans syndrome			Brachycephaly		
Curry-Jones syndrome		Coronal (unilateral, sometimes bilateral)			
Cutis laxa, autosomal recessive, type 2E					

== D ==
Condition	Image	Impacted sutures	Cranial shape	Notes	Sources
DEGCAGS syndrome			Plagiocephaly	Microcephaly	
Developmental delay with short stature, dysmorphic facial features, and sparse hair			Scaphocephaly, trigonocephaly		
Distal 10q deletion syndrome			Dolichocephaly	Microcephaly	
Distal monosomy 7p					
Distal trisomy 1p36		Metopic		Microcephaly	
Distal trisomy 5q				Microcephaly	
Distal symphalangism					

== E ==
Condition	Image	Impacted sutures	Cranial shape	Notes	Sources
Ehlers-Danlos syndrome, spondylodysplastic type				Macrocephaly	

== F ==
Condition	Image	Impacted sutures	Cranial shape	Notes	Sources
Familial scaphocephaly syndrome, McGillivray type			Dolichocephaly		
Fontaine progeroid syndrome		Coronal	Brachycephaly, turricephaly	Microcephaly	
Frontometaphyseal dysplasia				Part of oto-palato-digital syndrome spectrum	
Frontonasal dysplasia with alopecia and genital anomaly			Brachycephaly, plagiocephaly (anterior)	Microcephaly	

== G ==
Condition	Image	Impacted sutures	Cranial shape	Notes	Sources
Glass-Chapman-Hockley syndrome		Coronal		Only seen in a single family.	
Gomez Lopez Hernandez syndrome			Brachycephaly, turricephaly		
Greig cephalopolysyndactyly syndrome		Metopic	Dolichocephaly/scaphocephaly, trigonocephaly	Delayed suture closure, macrocephaly	

== H ==
Condition	Image	Impacted sutures	Cranial shape	Notes	Sources
Hartsfield-Bixler-Demyer syndrome				Microcephaly	
Holoprosencephaly-craniosynostosis syndrome		Coronal			
Hunter-McAlpine craniosynostosis					
Hyper-IgE recurrent infection syndrome			Scaphocephaly		
Hypogonadotropic hypogonadism (TCF12)		Coronal (bilateral)	Plagiocephaly (anterior)		
Hypomandibular faciocranial dysostosis		Coronal			
Hypophosphatemic rickets, autosomal recessive (DMP1)					

== I ==
Condition	Image	Impacted sutures	Cranial shape	Notes	Sources
IMAGe syndrome				Macrocephaly	
Infantile hypophosphatasia					
Intellectual developmental disorder with autistic features and language delay, with or without seizures				Microcephaly	
Intellectual disability, autosomal dominant (TLK2)				Microcephaly	
Intellectual disability, X-linked syndromic, Turner type (HUWE1)			Brachycephaly, trigonocephaly	Macrocephaly or microcephaly	
Intellectual disability-hypotonia-brachycephaly-pyloric stenosis-cryptorchidism syndrome			Brachycephaly		

== J ==
Condition	Image	Impacted sutures	Cranial shape	Notes	Sources
Jackson-Weiss syndrome					

== L ==
Condition	Image	Impacted sutures	Cranial shape	Notes	Sources
Larsen-like syndrome, B3GAT3 type			Brachycephaly		
Lethal occipital encephalocele-skeletal dysplasia syndrome			Brachycephaly		
Loeys-Dietz syndrome			Dolichocephaly		
Lowry-MacLean syndrome				Microcephaly	

== M ==
Condition	Image	Impacted sutures	Cranial shape	Notes	Sources
Mandibular prognathia					
Marshall-Smith syndrome			Dolichocephaly		
Meier-Gorlin syndrome		Sagittal		Microcephaly (progressive)	
Metaphyseal acroscyphodysplasia					
Metaphyseal chondrodysplasia-retinitis pigmentosa syndrome				Macrocephaly	
Microcephaly-micromelia syndrome				Microcephaly	
Monosomy 9q22.3 (microdeletion)		Metopic		Same characteristic features as Gorlin syndrome, including macrocephaly	
Mosaic variegated aneuploidy syndrome			Dolichocephaly	Microcephaly	
Mucolipidosis type II			Trigonocephaly		
Muenke syndrome		Coronal	Brachycephaly, plagiocephaly	Macrocephaly	
Multiple congenital anomalies-neurodevelopmental syndrome, X-linked		Metopic		Macrocephaly or microcephaly	

== N ==
Condition	Image	Impacted sutures	Cranial shape	Notes	Sources
Neurodevelopmental disorder with microcephaly, seizures, and brain atrophy (NEDMISB)				Microcephaly	
Neurodevelopmental disorder with speech impairment and dysmorphic facies (NEDSID)				Macrocephaly	
Neurodevelopmental disorder-craniofacial dysmorphism-cardiac defect-hip dysplasia syndrome due to a point mutation			Dolichocephaly		
Noonan syndrome-like disorder with loose anagen hair (PPP1CB)				Macrocephaly (relative)	

== O ==
Condition	Image	Impacted sutures	Cranial shape	Notes	Sources
Obesity-colitis-hypothyroidism-cardiac hypertrophy-developmental delay syndrome				Described in 2 brothers, one of whom died within a month of birth.	
Osteoglophonic dysplasia			Cloverleaf skull	Mild cloverleaf skull presentation closer to a more tower-shaped skull.	
Osteosclerosis, Stanescu type			Brachycephaly	Microcephaly	
Osteosclerosis-developmental delay-craniosynostosis syndrome			Brachycephaly	Macrocephaly; described in 13 patients from a four-generation family.	

== P ==
Condition	Image	Impacted sutures	Cranial shape	Notes	Sources
Parenti-Mignot neurodevelopmental syndrome					
Peters plus syndrome				Macrocephaly or microcephaly	
Pfeiffer syndrome		Coronal	Brachyturricephaly, cloverleaf skull	Also classified as Acrocephalosyndactyly type V.	
Potocki-Shaffer syndrome			Brachycephaly, turricephaly		
Progeroid and marfanoid aspect-lipodystrophy syndrome			Scaphocephaly	Macrocephaly	
Pseudo-Hurler polydystrophy					

== R ==
Condition	Image	Impacted sutures	Cranial shape	Notes	Sources
Rahman syndrome				Macrocephaly	
Rienhoff syndrome			Brachycephaly, dolichocephaly	Usually classified as LDS type 5.	
Roberts-SC phocomelia syndrome			Brachycephaly	Microcephaly	
Robinow-Sorauf syndrome		Pansynostosis	Plagiocephaly	Now classified as a variant of SCS.	

== S ==
Condition	Image	Impacted sutures	Cranial shape	Notes	Sources
Saethre-Chotzen syndrome		Coronal	Brachycephaly, oxycephaly, plagiocephaly	Delayed suture closure; also classified as Acrocephalosyndactyly type III.	
Saldino-Mainzer syndrome			Scaphocephaly, trigonocephaly	Microcephaly	
Shprintzen-Goldberg syndrome			Dolichocephaly, brachyturricephaly	Microcephaly	
SLC39A8-CDG					
Spondyloepiphyseal dysplasia, Nishimura type					
Structural brain anomalies with impaired intellectual development and craniosynostosis		Coronal	Brachycephaly	Microcephaly	
Summitt syndrome			Oxycephaly	Last reported 1979; now classified as Carpenter syndrome variant.	
Syndactyly type 1 (2q35 duplication)		Sagittal			
Syndactyly-telecanthus-anogenital and renal malformations syndrome					

== T ==
Condition	Image	Impacted sutures	Cranial shape	Notes	Sources
Thanatophoric dysplasia			Cloverleaf skull	Macrocephaly	
Tolchin-Le Caignec syndrome			Scaphocephaly, oxycephaly	Large head circumference	
Trigonocephaly (FGFR1)		Metopic	Trigonocephaly	Microcephaly; usually considered nonsyndromic.	
Trigonocephaly (FREM1)		Metopic	Trigonocephaly	Microcephaly; usually considered nonsyndromic.	
Trigonocephaly-broad thumbs syndrome			Trigonocephaly	Described in a mother and son.	

== V ==
Condition	Image	Impacted sutures	Cranial shape	Notes	Sources
Van den Ende-Gupta syndrome			Scaphocephaly		

== Z ==
Condition	Image	Impacted sutures	Cranial shape	Notes	Sources
ZTTK syndrome				Macrocephaly (can be relative)	
