= Scaphocephaly =

Skull malformation such that the head is long and narrow

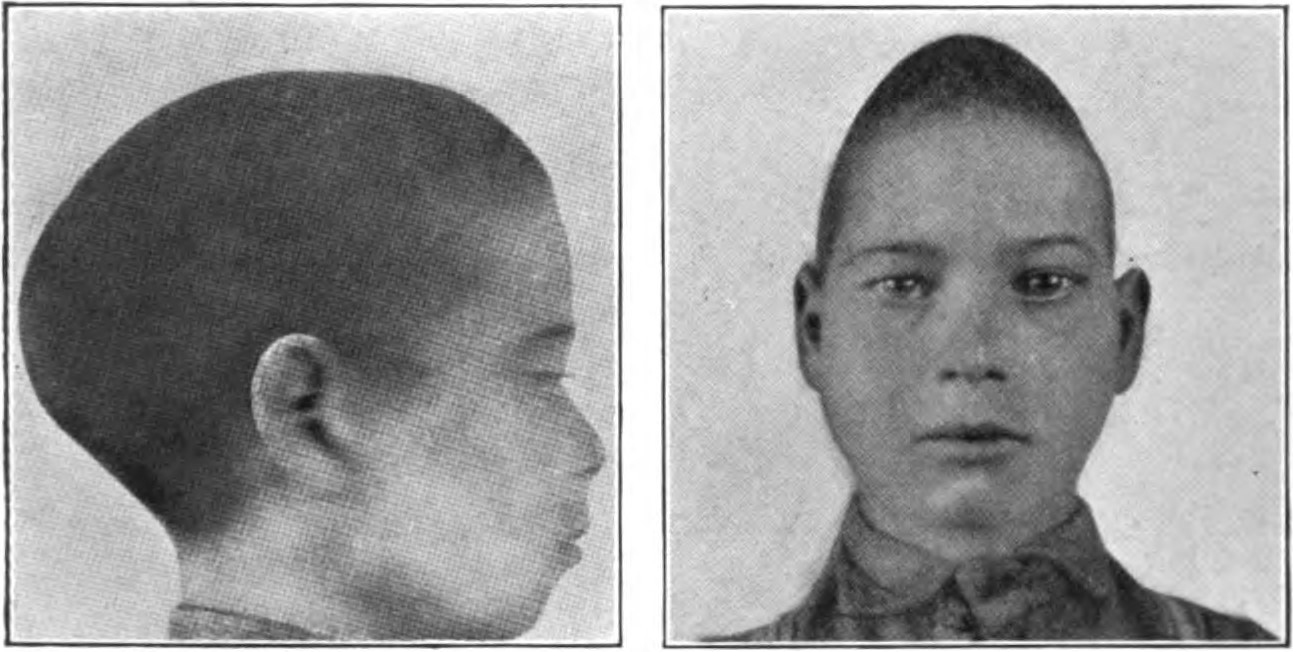
- Boy with scaphocephaly
- Pronunciation: skaf-o-SEF-aly
- Specialty: Medical genetics

Scaphocephaly or sagittal craniosynostosis is a type of cephalic disorder which occurs when there is a premature fusion of the sagittal suture. Premature closure results in limited lateral expansion of the skull, resulting in a characteristic long, narrow head. The skull base is typically spared. The word comes from Ancient Greek σκᾰ́φη (skáphē) 'boat' and κεφαλή (kephalḗ) 'head'.

Scaphocephaly is the most common of the craniosynostosis conditions and accounts for approximately 50% of all craniosynostosis. It is most commonly idiopathic (non-syndromic).

== Etiology ==
Non-syndromic

The underlying cause of the non-syndromic form is unknown. Over 100 mutations have been associated, including mutations in the FGFR genes. Several potential risk factors have been identified for craniosynostosis include:

- Advanced maternal age
- White maternal race
- Maternal smoking
- Male infant
- Certain paternal occupations (e.g. agriculture, forestry, repairmen)

Syndromic

Sagittal craniosynostosis is seen in many conditions and syndromes:

- Acrocephalosyndactyly type I
- Baller–Gerold syndrome
- Pfeiffer syndrome
- Coffin–Siris syndrome 7
- Cranioectodermal dysplasia
- Craniosynostosis (nonsyndromic) 4
- Craniosynostosis and dental anomalies
- Craniosynostosis-anal anomalies-porokeratosis syndrome
- Craniosynostosis-Dandy–Walker malformation-hydrocephalus syndrome
- Crouzon syndrome
- Meier-Gorlin syndrome 7
- Neonatal diabetes mellitus with congenital hypothyroidism
- Noonan syndrome 3
- Carpenter syndrome
- Syndactyly type 1 (Chromosome 2q35 Duplication Syndrome)
- Tatton-Brown–Rahman syndrome
- TCF12-related craniosynostosis
- Teebi hypertelorism syndrome 1
- Trigonocephaly-short stature-developmental delay syndrome
- TWIST1-related craniosynostosis

== Diagnosis and evaluation ==
Diagnosis of scaphocephaly is with physical exam, which may show characteristic features such as an elongated head in the anterior-posterior dimension, narrow head in the lateral dimension, and bony ridge at the vertex.

Further evaluation with imaging may also be performed. Ultrasound may be used to detect fusion of the suture. CT scans may also be used to help with surgical planning and to diagnose associated hydrocephalus, which has been found to be present in 44% of cases in one study. A measure of cephalic index may also be reduced, however the reliability of measurements may not be a reliable measure.

== Classification ==
Scaphocephaly can be classified into specific types, depending on morphology, position, and suture closure:

- Bathrocephaly – bulging of the mid-section of the occipital bone; also associated with isolated mendosal suture synostosis.
- Clinocephaly – flat cranium due to loss of cranial convexity; top of head is depressed inwards.
- Dolichocephaly – long and narrow head.
- Leptocephaly – synostosis extends down to the metopic suture; the head becomes narrow, but tall rather than long.
- Sphenocephaly – wedge-shaped head.
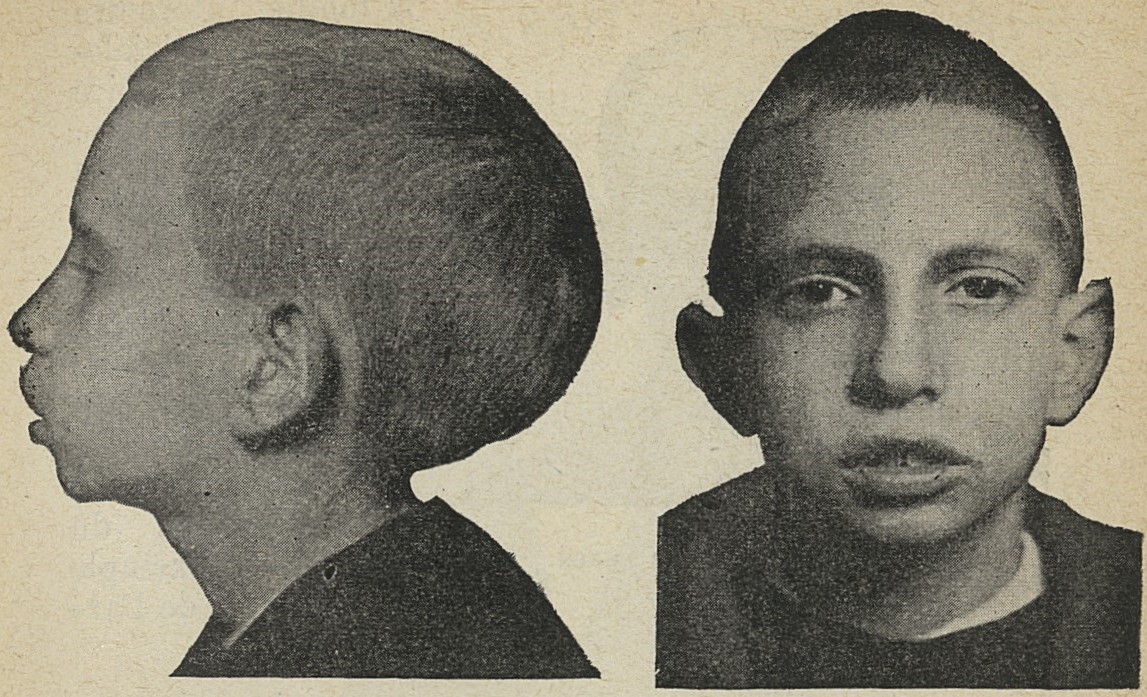
Dolichocephaly

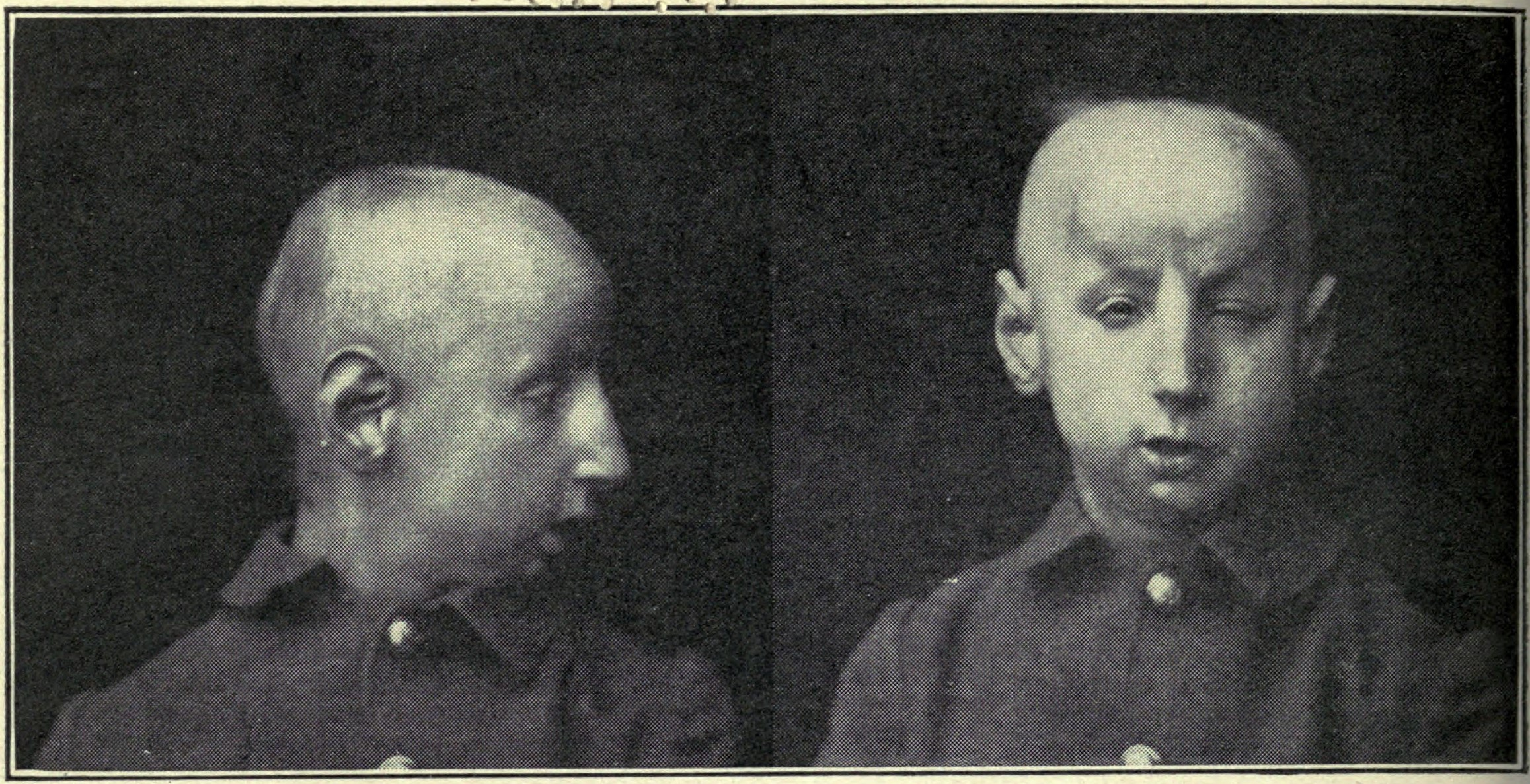
Leptocephaly

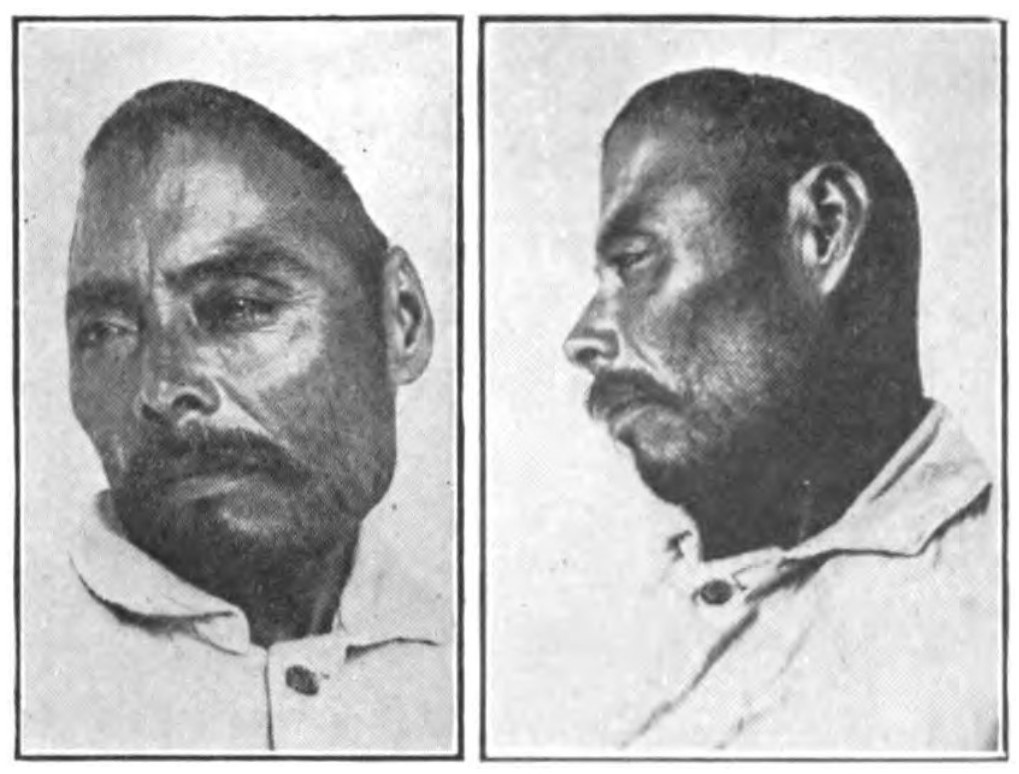
Sphenocephaly

== Treatment ==
This condition can be corrected by surgery if the child is young enough, typically within the first 3–6 months. The goal of treatment is to correct intracranial pressure and repair bony deformities. The decision to treat is multifactorial and should be performed at a center with an experienced craniofacial team. In addition to the primary craniofacial surgeon, team members may include audiologists, dentists, otolaryngologists, neurosurgeons, plastic surgeons, and other supporting members.

Surgery is generally aimed at removal of the fused sagittal suture to allow for lateral expansion of the skull. Surgical options include:

- Endoscopic strip craniectomy: Minimally invasive removal of the fused suture. Following surgery, patients typically wear a helmet to help shape the head. Helmets are usually worn for 3–12 months.
- Open cranial vault remodeling: Open surgical removal of the fused sagittal suture and re-shaping of the skull, generally with resorbable plates.
- Spring cranioplasty: Combination of an endoscopic strip craniectomy with placement of springs which provide continuous force for re-shaping the skull.

== Terminology ==
The term, from Greek skaphe meaning 'light boat or skiff' and kephale meaning 'head', describes a specific shape of a long narrow head that resembles a boat.

== See also ==
- Dolichocephaly
