= FTHS =

FTHS may refer to:

- Frank–ter Haar syndrome
- Freehold Township High School, in New Jersey, United States
- Toyota FT-HS, a hybrid sports car concept

== See also ==
- FTH (disambiguation)
