= Brachyturricephaly =

- Other names: High prominent forehead High, prominent forehead Turribrachycephaly
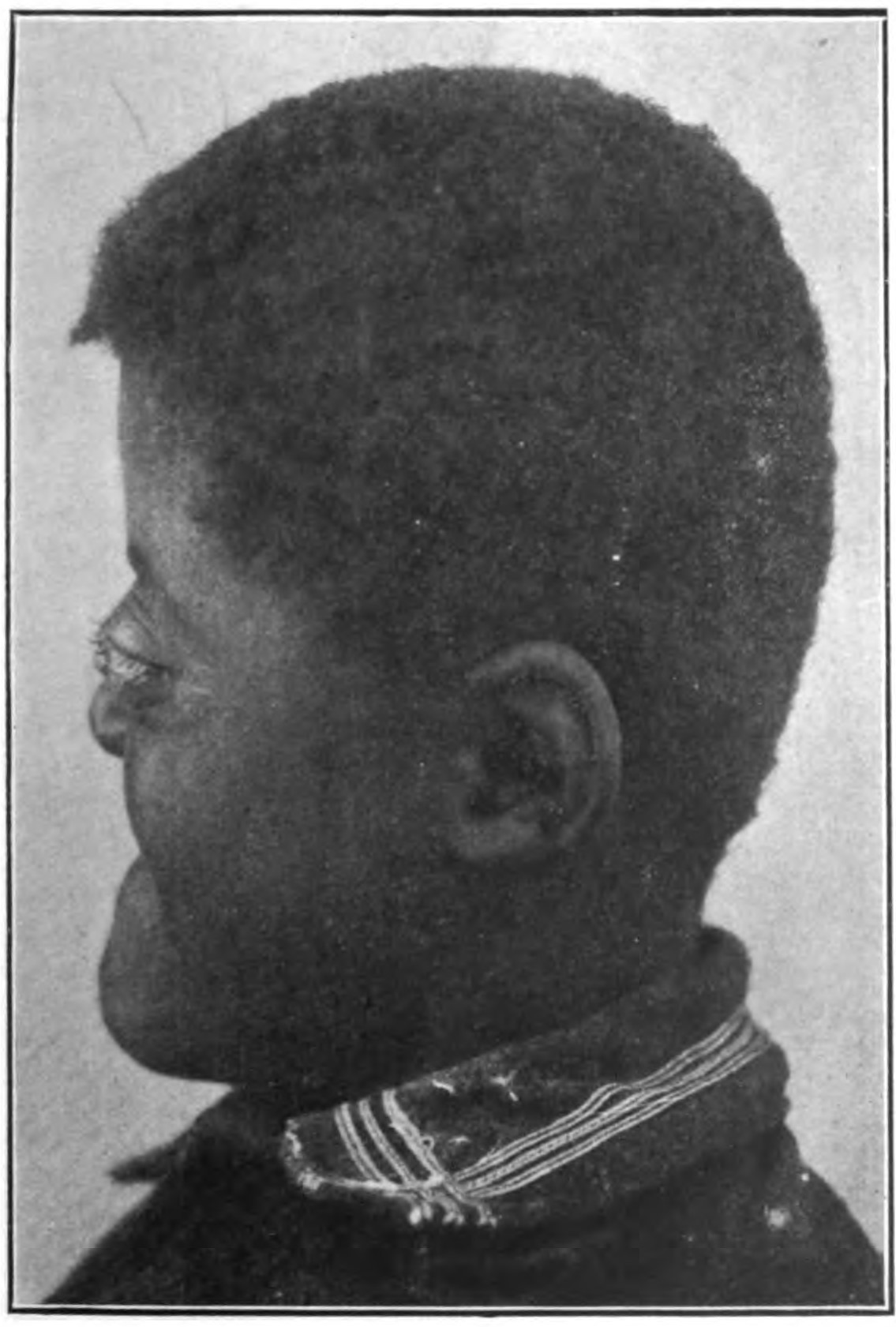
- Brachyturricephaly in an 8-year-old female with Acrocephalosyndactyly type I

Brachyturricephaly is a form of complex craniosynostosis (a combination of brachycephaly and turricephaly) in which the head has both an abnormally high vertical height and a shortened length from anterior to posterior. Malformations of the occipital region are also often present.

== Conditions ==
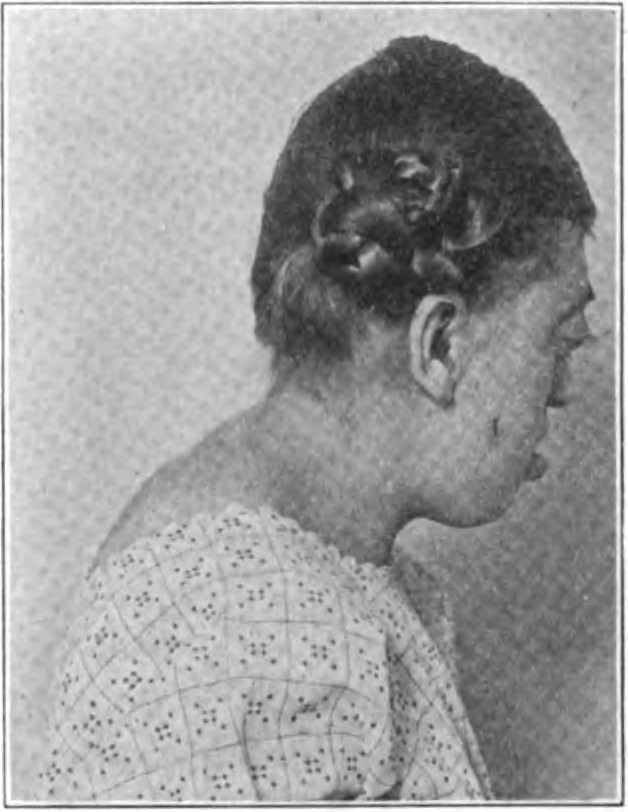
Brachyturricephaly in a 14-year-old female with Pfeiffer syndrome

Brachyturricephaly is seen in the following conditions:

- Acrocephalosyndactyly type I
- Baller–Gerold syndrome
- Craniofacial dyssynostosis
- Craniosynostosis (nonsyndromic) 2
- Lethal osteosclerotic bone dysplasia
- Microphthalmia with cyst, bilateral facial clefts, and limb anomalies
- Osteogenesis imperfecta type 12
- Peroxisome biogenesis disorder 1A (Zellweger)
- Pfeiffer syndrome
- Shprintzen–Goldberg syndrome
- Uruguay Faciocardiomusculoskeletal syndrome

== See also ==
- List of conditions with craniosynostosis
