= Leptocephaly =

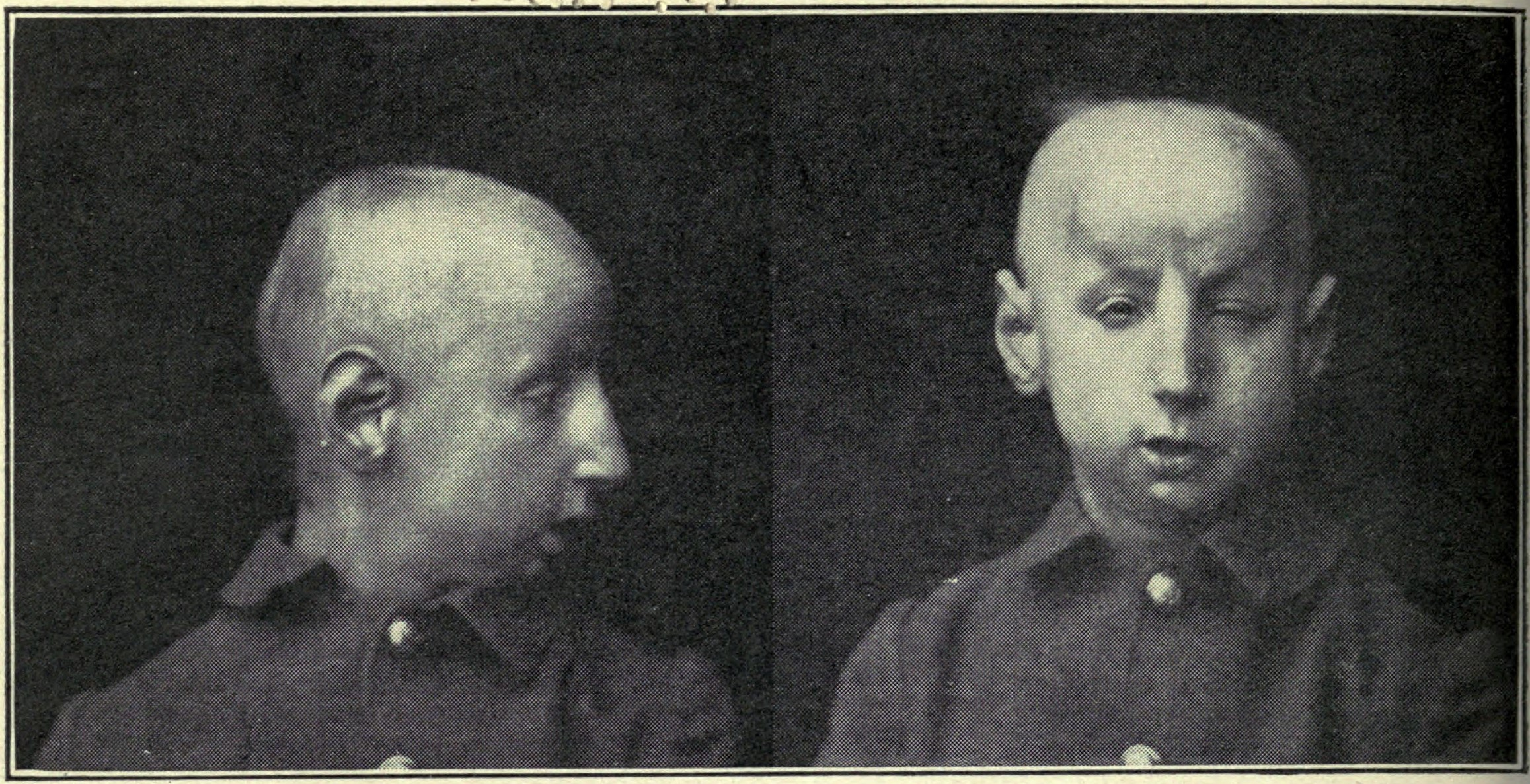
- Leptocephaly in a male patient with intellectual disability and occipital broadening

Leptocephaly is a rare form of complex craniosynostosis (usually considered a form of scaphocephaly) in which the sagittal and metopic suture simultaneously close. Leptocephaly is characterized by equal narrowing of the head (from full sagittal fusion) and a tall and narrow (rather than long) head shape. Leptocephaly is usually nonsyndromic, but has been seen in individual cases such as Neu-Laxova syndrome.

The term leptocephaly has also been used (erroneously) to refer to microcephaly.

== See also ==
- List of conditions with craniosynostosis
- Trigonocephaly (isolated metopic synostosis)
