= Hyperkeratotic cutaneous capillary-venous malformation =

Skin condition

- Specialty: Dermatology

Hyperkeratotic cutaneous capillary-venous malformation is a cutaneous (skin) condition characterized also by inherited cerebral capillary malformations.

== See also ==
- Lowry–MacLean syndrome
- List of cutaneous conditions
