= Craniosynostosis, Philadelphia type =

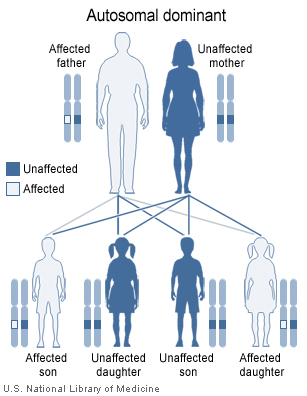
- Autosomal dominant inheritance

Craniosynostosis, Philadelphia type is a rare autosomal dominant syndrome characterized by sagittal craniosynostosis (scaphocephaly) and soft tissue syndactyly of the hands and feet. This condition is considered a form of acrocephalosyndactyly.

== Signs and symptoms ==
Features of this condition include:

- Sagittal craniosynostosis (dolichocephaly/scaphocephaly)
- Mitten-like syndactyly

Facial features in this condition are usually normal.

== History ==
In 1996, a distinct form of acrocephalosyndactyly was reported in five generations of a single family. Over these five generations, an autosomal dominant pattern of sagittal craniosynostosis and soft tissue syndactyly was noted. The syndactyly was mitten-like and resembled Apert syndrome but was excluded as being caused by Apert syndrome due to the lack of bony involvement.

== Causes ==
This condition is caused by duplications in chromosome 2 near-identical to those responsible for syndactyly type 1 (Chromosome 2q35 Duplication Syndrome).
