= Rudolf Arthur Pfeiffer =

German geneticist

Rudolf Arthur Pfeiffer (30 March 1931 – 1 June 2012) was a German geneticist. He discovered Pfeiffer syndrome in 1964.

Pfeiffer was born in Saarbrücken, Germany, on 30 March 1931.

He studied at the Universities of Vienna, Frankfurt, and Heidelberg.

Pfeiffer was awarded with the Order of Merit of the Federal Republic of Germany and the Ordre des Palmes académiques.

He died in Erlangen on 1 June 2012.
