= Acrocephalosyndactyly =

Group of diseases

- Other names: ACS
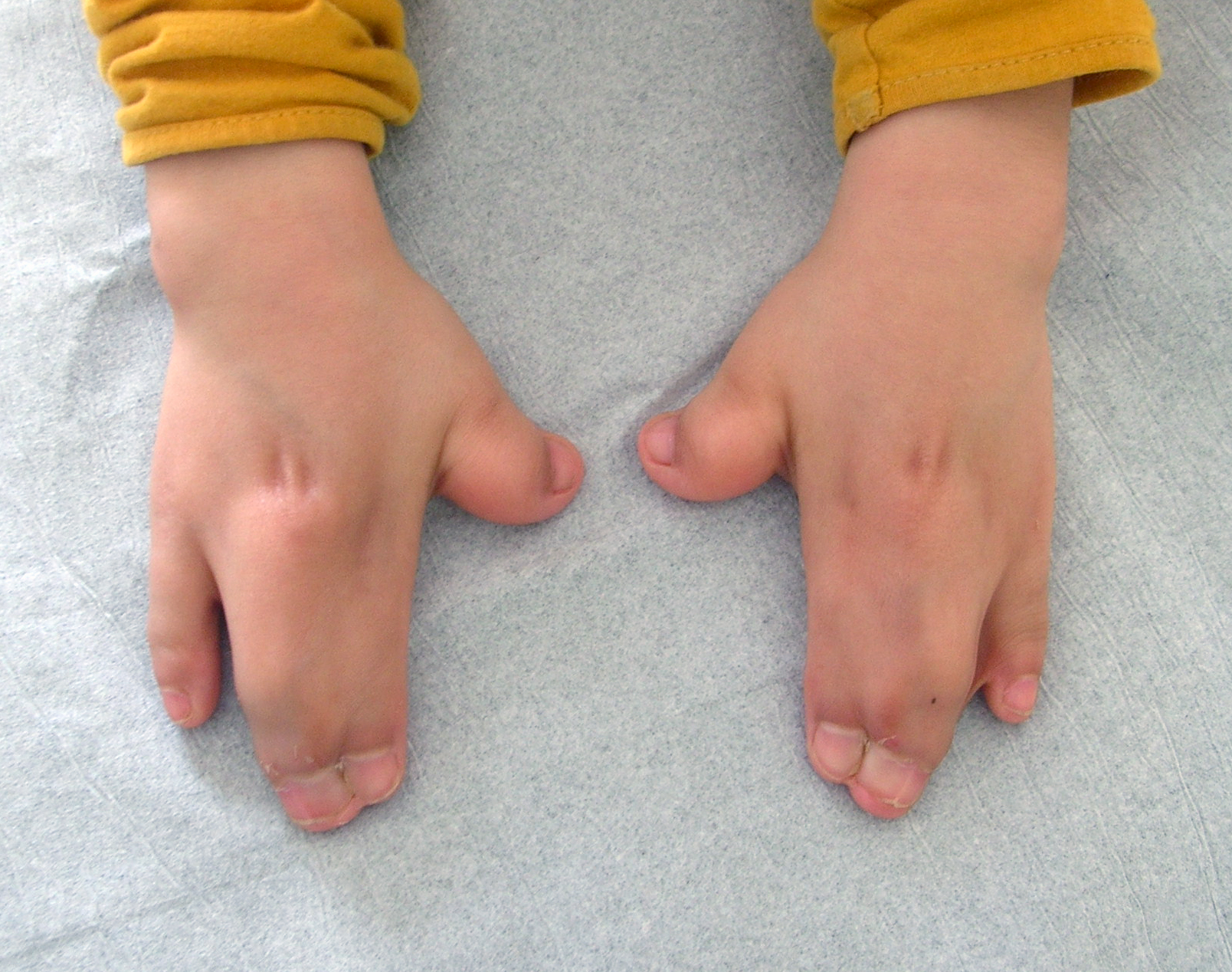
- Syndactyly in acrocephalosyndactyly (Apert)
- Specialty: Medical genetics

Acrocephalosyndactyly is a group of congenital conditions characterized by irregular features of the face and skull (craniosynostosis) and hands and feet (syndactyly). Craniosynostosis occurs when the cranial sutures, the fibrous tissue connecting the skull bones, fuse the cranial bones early in development. Cranial sutures allow the skull bones to continue growing until they fuse at age 24. Premature fusing of the cranial sutures can result in alterations to the skull shape and interfere with brain growth. Syndactyly occurs when digits of the hands or feet are fused together. When polydactyly is also present, the classification is acrocephalopolysyndactyly. Polydactyly occurs when the hands or feet possess additional digits. Acrocephalosyndactyly is usually diagnosed after birth, although prenatal diagnosis is sometimes possible if the genetic variation is present in family members, as the conditions are typically inherited in an autosomal dominant pattern Treatment often involves surgery in early childhood to correct for craniosynostosis and syndactyly.

The severity of symptoms for acrocephalosyndactyly varies significantly by subtype and treatment in the early stages of life.

== History ==
Cases of the condition have been recorded as early as the 18th century. The term acrocephalosyndactyly (from Greek ἄκρος (ákros) 'highest, at the extremity', κεφαλή (kephalḗ) 'head', σύν (syn) 'together' and δάκτυλος (daktylos) 'finger') was first applied in 1906 by French physician Eugène Apert first to describe a condition characterized by craniosynostosis and syndactyly. The condition described by Apert is now known as the Apert syndrome subtype of acrocephalosyndactyly. Other subtypes of acrocephalosyndactyly were characterized throughout the 20th century.

== Prevalence ==
Considering all types of acrocephalosyndactyly, one newborn baby is born with acrocephalosyndactyly for every 65,000 - 102,500 babies born. There is no difference in the amount of males and females affected by acrocephalosyndactyly.

== Characteristics ==
Acrocephalosyndactyly presents in numerous different subtypes, however, considerable overlap in symptoms occurs. Generally, all forms of acrocephalosyndactyly are characterized by atypical craniofacial, hand, and foot characteristics, such as premature closure of the fibrous joints in between certain bones of the skull, fusion of certain fingers or toes, and/or more than the usual number of digits. Some subtypes also involve structural heart variations that are present at birth.

== Cause ==
Most forms of acrocephalosyndactyly or acrocephalopolysyndactyly are inherited in autosomal dominant pattern, with the exclusion of Carpenter Syndrome which is inherited in autosomal recessive manner. De-novo variants, or genetic alterations not inherited from one's parents, in different genes were reported to cause several types of acrocephalosyndactyly. Among known genetic changes, there are variations in genes such as Fibroblast growth factor receptor (FGFR), TWIST1, and RAB23. Constitutive activation in these categories of genes, particularly FGFR, which is heavily involved during the development stage of embryos such as organ development or organogenesis and the maintenance of tissue forming cells, known as progenitor cells, can be very detrimental.

Genetically inherited acrocephalosyndactyly conditions all show high to complete penetrance with a variable expression, meaning that all individuals who inherit the condition present atypical characteristic craniofacial, hand, and foot structures, but the severity of disabilities is variable. Increased paternal age is considered a risk factor in some cases.

== Impacts of Conditions on Life ==
Despite the current major efforts of surgical therapeutics on the effects of Acrocephalosyndactyly, morbidities still exist within individuals that have received treatment. Those who reach adulthood often have lower levels of education than their peers, as well as greater difficulty in various social aspects, such as dating, marriage, or sexual relationships. They may also report the need for assisted living throughout their life as well as other health issues, such as hearing issues or epilepsy at a more common frequency than their counterparts.

Fortunately, many individual with the condition report similar levels of happiness with their lives as non-afflicted individuals and show high social integration as well as great physical and emotional resilience despite any impediments.

== Diagnosis ==
=== Prenatal Diagnosis ===
Diagnosis prior to birth is possible for some forms of acrocephalosyndactyly. Prenatal genetic diagnosis is only possible if the gene variation responsible for the syndrome is known and the variation causing the disease has been identified within the genome of a family member. Collection of samples for genetic testing can be done using amniocentesis, which samples embryonic stem cells contained in amniotic fluid, or chorionic villus sampling, which samples placental cells. There has been a case of a prenatal diagnosis of Apert syndrome using fetoscopy, where the fetus is observed using an endoscope inserted into the uterus from the abdomen. Alternatively, there has been interest in using non-invasive techniques like ultrasound to detect atypical fetal skull features.

=== Postnatal Diagnosis ===
Most diagnoses of acrocephalosyndactyly occur after birth by assessing the physical symptoms of the infant. This can be supported with radiographic imaging, such as X-ray imaging, and molecular genetic testing, which looks for DNA variations known to cause the disease. Molecular genetic testing typically occurs in the FGFR, TWIST1, and RAB23 genes.

=== Nomenclature/Classification ===
There is no consistent nomenclature or classification across the different syndromes under the umbrella of acrocephalosyndactyly and acrocephalopolysyndactyly. Although acrocephalosyndactyly has been reported as early as the 18th century, the ACS and ACPS classifications only came in the latter 20th century. However, this classification may be outdated as it has been suggested that the distinction between acrocephalosyndactyly and acrocephalopolysyndactyly should be erased.

Currently, Noack syndrome (ACPS type I) is now classified as Pfeiffer syndrome (ACS type V); Goodman syndrome (ACPS type IV) is classified as a variation of Carpenter syndrome (ACPS type II); and different researchers have combined Apert (ASC type I), Crouzon (ASC type II), and Pfeiffer (ASC type V) syndrome into Apert-Crouzon and Crouzon-Pfeiffer syndrome.

Acrocephalosyndactyly type IV was formerly called Mohr Syndrome, however, it was later classified under Orofaciodigital syndrome type II. Pfeiffer syndrome was formerly type VI and Waardenburg type V, but this was changed sometime after 1966.

Acrocephalosyndactyly (ACS):

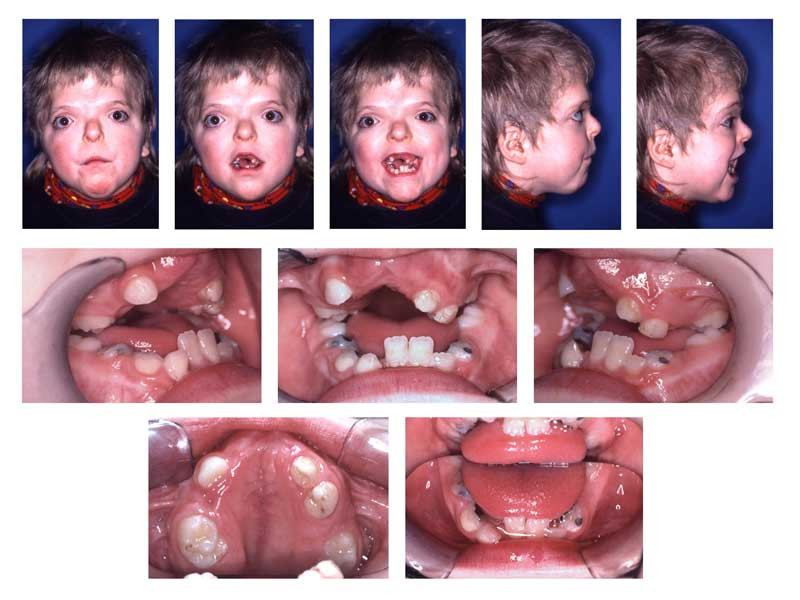
Patient with Apert (ACS Type I) syndrome
- type I – Apert syndrome
- type II – Crouzon syndrome
- type III – Saethre–Chotzen syndrome
  - Robinow-Sorauf syndrome suggested to be included in Saethre-Chotzen classification
- type IV – Mohr syndrome (archaic)
- type V – Pfeiffer syndrome
  - Noack syndrome incorporated into Pfeiffer syndrome classification
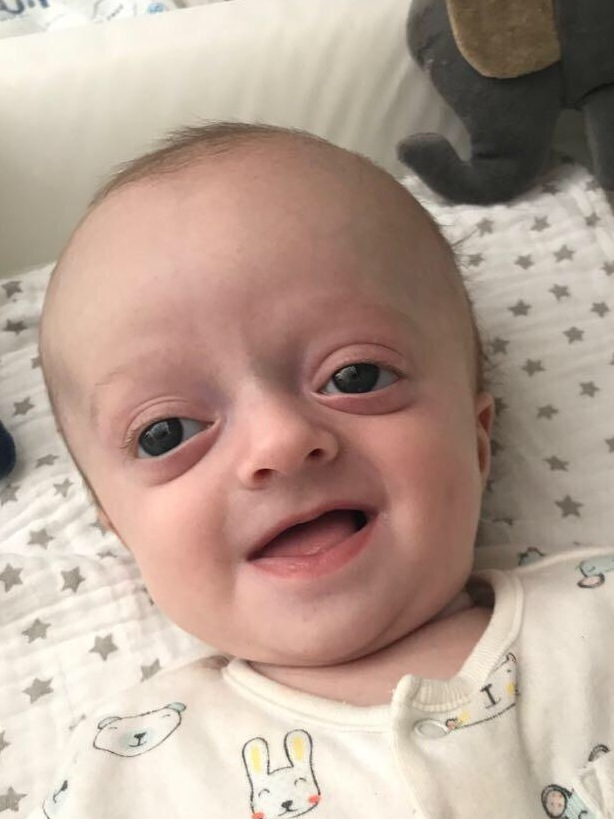
Patient with Crouzon (ACS Type II) syndrome

A related term, acrocephalopolysyndactyly (ACPS), refers to the inclusion of polydactyly to the presentation. It also has multiple types:

- type I – Noack syndrome (archaic)
- type II – Carpenter syndrome
  - Goodman syndrome incorporated into Carpenter syndrome classification
  - Summitt syndrome incorporated into Carpenter syndrome classification
- type III – Sakati-Nyhan-Tisdale syndrome
- type IV – Goodman syndrome (archaic)

== Treatment ==
=== Craniosynostosis ===
For subtypes with craniosynostosis, surgery is required to prevent premature fusion of cranial sutures, such as the coronal suture (brachycephaly). The cranial suture located between the two frontal and two parietal skull bones is called the coronal suture. Cranioplasty should be performed in the first year of life to prevent disruptions in brain growth due to increased intracranial pressure. Midface surgery may also be required in childhood to detach the midface from the rest of the skull to correct respiratory and orthodontic problems.

=== Syndactyly ===
Syndactyly in certain subtypes is rarely severe enough to affect hand function, so treatment may not be needed.

In more severe subtypes, as seen in Apert syndrome, surgical correction of syndactyly may be needed. Surgery is recommended to be performed as soon as possible, generally at 4 months of age. Treatment is dependent on the severity of syndactyly. The surgical treatment generally involves interdigital webspace release and thumb lengthening.

=== Management ===
Treatment for those diagnosed with acrocephalosyndactyly extends beyond surgery. There are many steps that can aid in long-term management of the syndrome. Individuals afflicted with acrocephalosyndactyly and their caregivers can build a health care support system by building strong relationships with a team of medical specialists. Preformed teams of medical specialists can often be found at universities or research institutions. Caregivers can prevent future challenges by exploring options for financial aid, health insurance, and accommodating educational institutions. Primary caregivers are encouraged to prioritize their emotional health by reserving time for themselves and by sourcing a reliable support system.

== See also ==
- List of skin conditions
- Oxycephaly
