= Kleeblattschaedel =

- Other names: Cloverleaf skull, kleeblattschädel, isolated cloverleaf skull syndrome
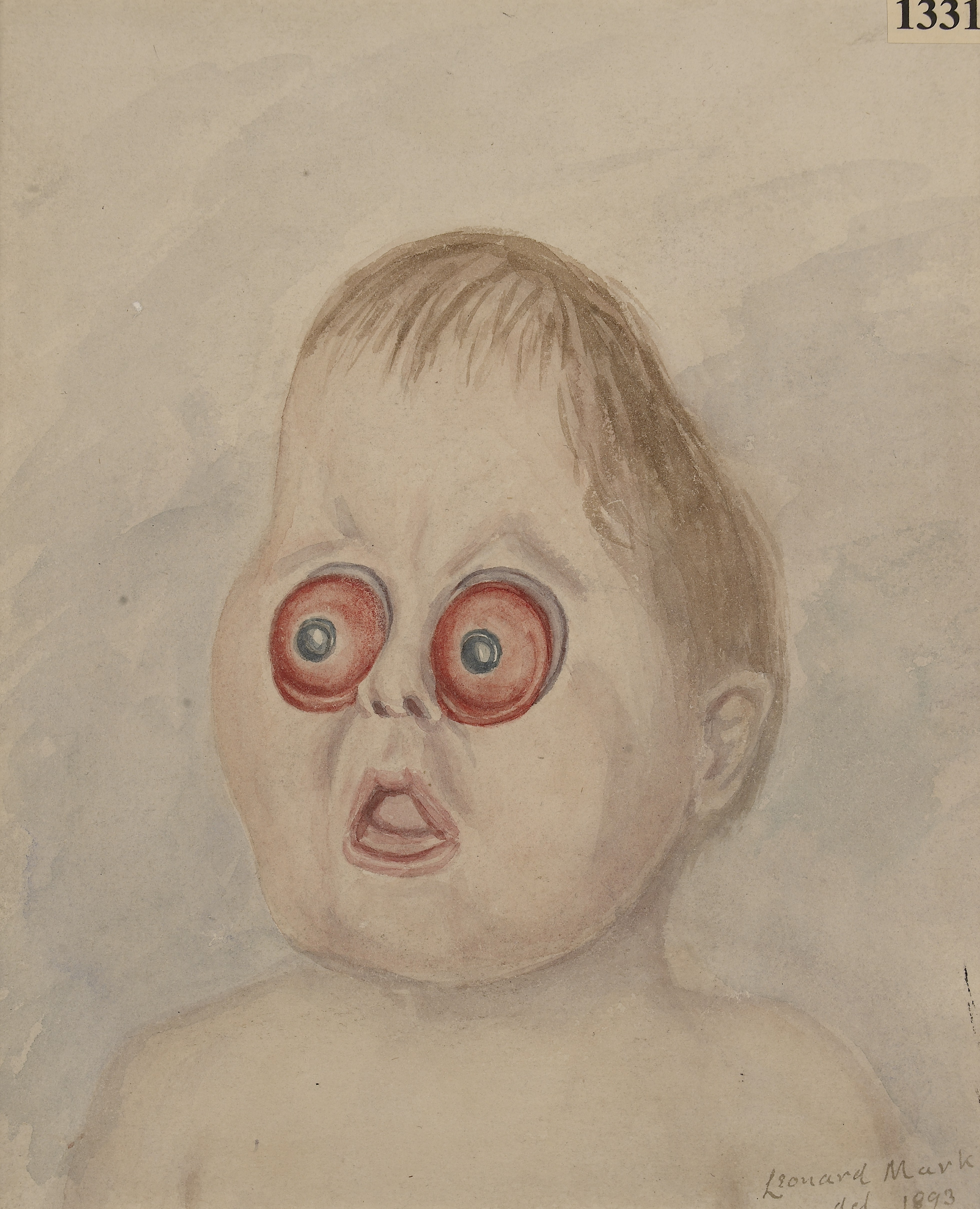
- 1-day-old female infant with kleeblattschaedel due to Crouzon syndrome
- Complications: Proptosis, recurrent corneal erosions, elbow ankylosis, hydrocephalus

Kleeblattschaedel, or isolated cloverleaf skull syndrome, is a rare malformation of the head where there is a protrusion of the skull and broadening of the face. This condition is a severe type of craniosynostosis.

The condition can be both isolated or associated with other craniofacial dysostosises. 85% of children with this condition have other anomalies. Severe forms of the condition are often a sign of syndromic craniosynostosis combined with a grotesque constriction ring of the lambdoid structure and the squamosal bone or in another area.

== Name and etymology ==
Kleeblattschaedel (Kleeblattschädel) is German for "cloverleaf skull". The disorder was named Kleeblattschaedel syndrome in 1958. The German word is sometimes used in medical English, where it is often regarded as more or less naturalized, thus appearing in any combination of capitalized or not, with umlaut diacritic or not, and italicized or not.

== History ==
The first case reported was in 1849. The condition was first identified in 1960, and the first case in the United States was reported in 1965.

== Causes ==
The condition is caused by a premature fusing of the fibrous sutures. The distinctive head shape seen in kleeblattschaedel is caused by the closure of the sagittal, coronal, and lambdoid sutures, with subsequent bulging of the cranial contents leading to a trilobate head shape. The condition is also caused by absence of the coronal and lambdoid sutures.

Conditions with kleeblattschaedel include:

- Antley-Bixler syndrome
- Beare-Stevenson cutis gyrata syndrome
- Carpenter syndrome
- Cloverleaf skull-asphyxiating thoracic dysplasia syndrome
- Cloverleaf skull-multiple congenital anomalies syndrome
- Cranioectodermal dysplasia 2
- Crouzon syndrome
- Micromelic bone dysplasia with cloverleaf skull
- Mosaic trisomy 5
- Muenke syndrome
- Osteoglophonic dysplasia
- Pfeiffer syndrome
- Thanatophoric dysplasia, types 1 and 2
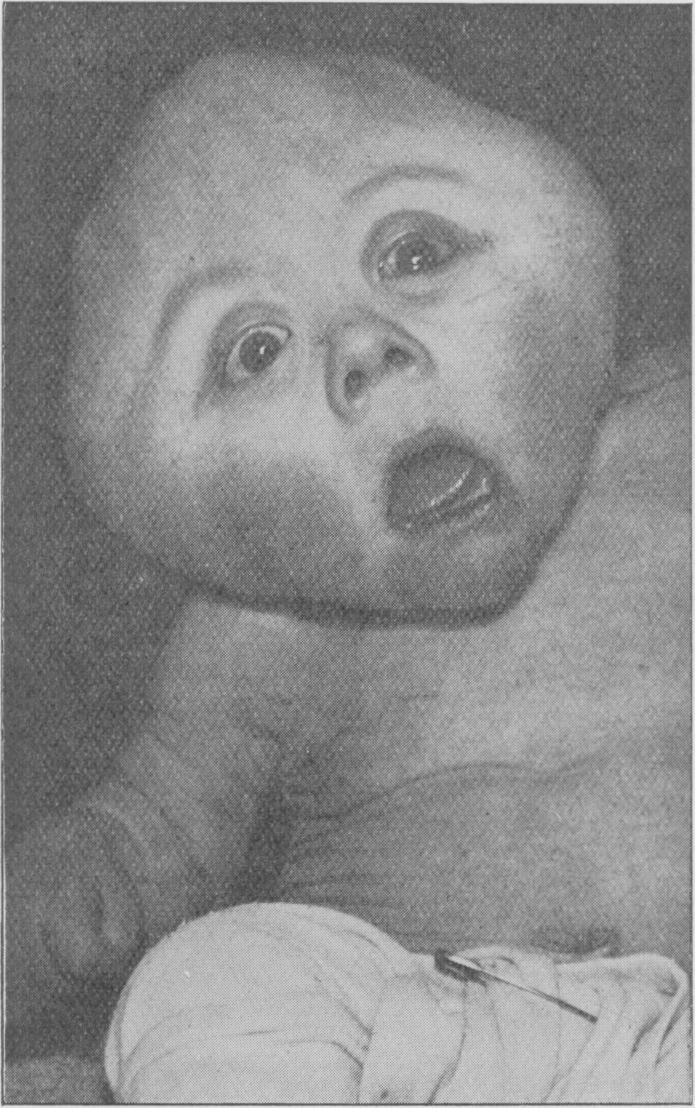
Carpenter syndrome

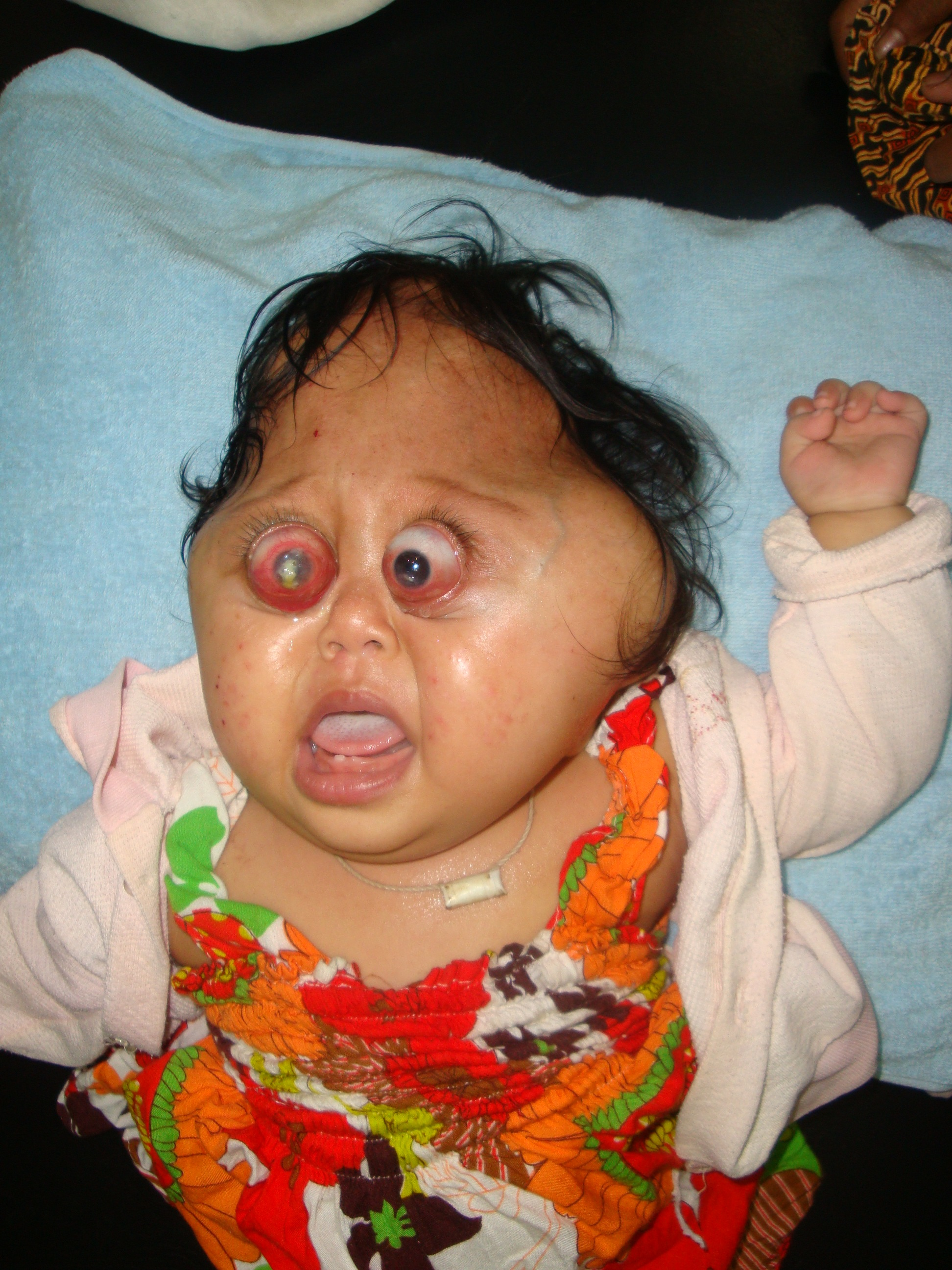
Crouzon syndrome

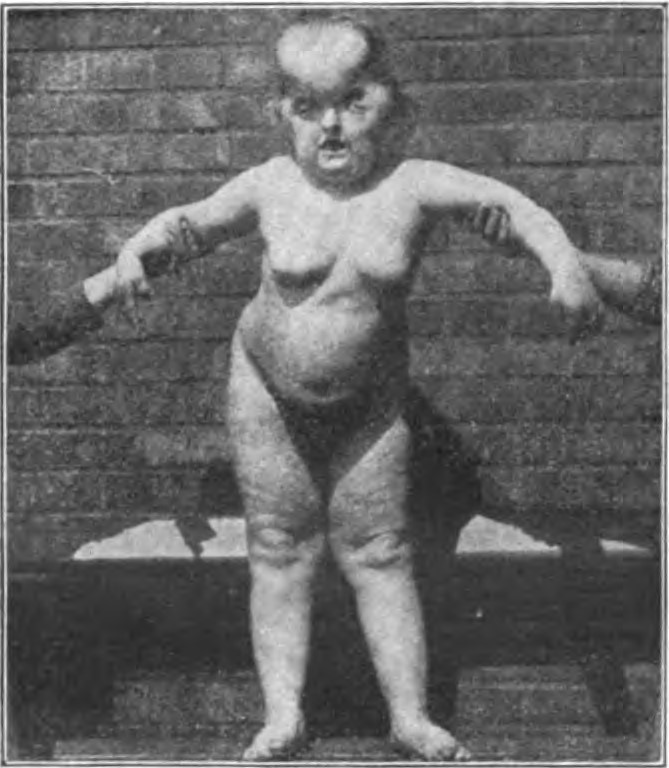
Pfeiffer syndrome

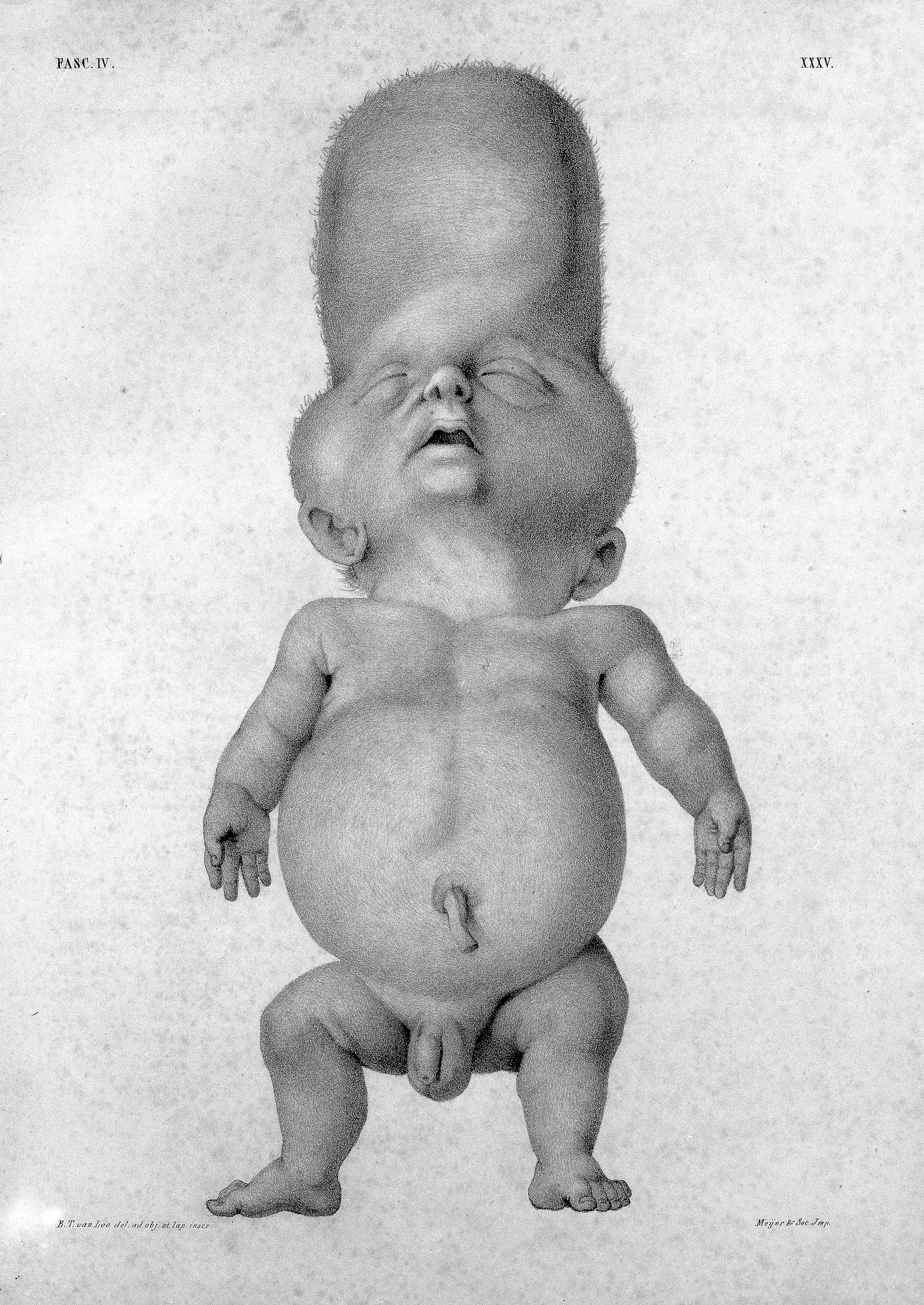
Thanatophoric dysplasia

== Epidemiology ==
The condition occurs equally in both males as in females.
