= Frank–Ter Haar syndrome =

- Autosomal recessive is the inheritance pattern of this condition
- Differential diagnosis: Bent bone dysplasia syndrome Melnick-Needles syndrome Mucopolysaccharidosis type VI
- Prognosis: Most die early from mitral valve prolapse.

Frank–Ter Haar syndrome (FTHS), also known as Ter Haar-syndrome, is a rare disease characterized by abnormalities that affect bone, heart, and eye development. Children born with the disease usually die very young.

== Presentation ==
The primary characteristics of FTHS are brachycephaly (flat head), wide fontanelle (soft spot on a baby's head), prominent forehead, hypertelorism (abnormally wide distance between the eyes), prominent eyes, macrocornea (large corneas), optic disc edema, full cheeks, small chin, bowing of the long bones in the arms or legs, and finger deformities. Protruding, simple ears and a prominent coccyx (tailbone) are also regarded as important diagnostic signs of FTHS.

== Genetic ==
SH3PXD2B

Identifiers
- Aliases: SH3PXD2B, FAD49, FTHS, HOFI, KIAA1295, TKS4, TSK4, SH3 and PX domains 2B
- External IDs: OMIM: 613293; MGI: 2442062; GeneCards: SH3PXD2B

Gene location (Human)
Chr.	Chromosome 5 (human)
Band	5q35.1	Start	172,325,000 bp
Band	5q35.1	End	172,454,525 bp

Gene location (Mouse)
Chr.	Chromosome 11 (mouse)
Band	11|11 A4	Start	32,297,820 bp
Band	11|11 A4	End	32,378,173 bp
RNA expression pattern
Bgee	Human / Mouse (ortholog); Top expressed in: decidua; sural nerve; urethra; skin of hip; nasal epithelium; ventricular zone; canal of the cervix; gastric mucosa; myometrium; stromal cell of endometrium / Top expressed in: otic vesicle; external carotid artery; hand; internal carotid artery; calvaria; molar; body of femur; otolith organ; utricle; stroma of bone marrow; More reference expression data
BioGPS	n/a
Gene ontology
Molecular function	SH2 domain binding; protein binding; phosphatidylinositol binding; phosphatidylinositol-4-phosphate binding; phosphatidylinositol-5-phosphate binding; superoxide-generating NADPH oxidase activator activity; phosphatidylinositol-3-phosphate binding; phosphatidylinositol-3,5-bisphosphate binding
Cellular component	cytoplasm; cell projection; cell junction; podosome
Biological process	eye development; protein localization to membrane; skeletal system development; cell differentiation; extracellular matrix disassembly; development of the heart; adipose tissue development; bone development; positive regulation of fat cell differentiation; superoxide metabolic process; podosome assembly; positive regulation of catalytic activity; osteoblast fate commitment; positive regulation of gene expression; positive regulation of multicellular organism growth; skeletal system morphogenesis; positive regulation of stress fiber assembly; regulation of brood size; positive regulation of adipose tissue development; cranial skeletal system development
Sources:Amigo / QuickGO
Orthologs
Databases	NCBI: entry; OMA: entry
Species	Human	Mouse
Entrez	285590	268396
Ensembl	ENSG00000174705	ENSMUSG00000040711
UniProt	A1X283; H0YAU1	A2AAY5
RefSeq (mRNA)	NM_001017995; NM_001308175	NM_177364
RefSeq (protein)	NP_001017995; NP_001295104	NP_796338
Location (UCSC)	Chr 5: 172.33 – 172.45 Mb	Chr 11: 32.3 – 32.38 Mb
PubMed search
- Wikidata
View/Edit Human	View/Edit Mouse

Genetic mapping in several families with FTHS linked the disease to an inherited mutation in the gene SH3PXD2B, that codes for a protein called Tks4. Tks4 was already known for its role in the formation of cellular projections known as podosomes, which allow cells to migrate. A mouse model that lacks the Tks4 gene shows all the symptoms of FTHS confirmed the hypothesis that Tks4 mutation is responsible for the disease.

== Treatment ==
There is no treatment for FTHS, though identification of TKS4 mutation as a causative factor may eventually provide new opportunities for neonatal screening in high-risk families.

== History ==
In 1973, researchers led by Yitzchak Frank, most recently at Mount Sinai Hospital in New York, described an 18-month-old Bedouin girl, born to consanguineous parents, who presented with enlarged corneas, multiple bone abnormalities, and developmental delay. In 1982, Dutch pediatrician Ben ter Haar reported on three similar patients thought to have Melnick–Needles syndrome. Over the next twenty years, several more similar cases were identified and eventually attributed to a new disorder, now called Frank–Ter Haar syndrome. FTHS is distinguished from other similar conditions based on its pattern of inheritance and association with congenital glaucoma and congenital heart disease.
