= Bent bone dysplasia syndrome =

Rare genetic skeletal dysplasia

- Other names: BBDS; FGFR2-related bent bone dysplasia; bent bone dysplasia-FGFR2 type
- Specialty: Medical genetics
- Symptoms: Bowed long bones, poor skull mineralization, craniosynostosis, osteopenia, facial differences
- Usual onset: Prenatal or neonatal period
- Causes: Pathogenic variants in FGFR2 or LAMA5
- Diagnostic method: Prenatal testing
- Prognosis: Often lethal in the perinatal period; longer-term survival is rare but documented
- Frequency: Extremely rare

Bent bone dysplasia syndrome (BBDS) is an extremely rare genetic skeletal dysplasia characterized by bowed long bones and abnormal bone mineralization. The most studied form, FGFR2-related bent bone dysplasia, is usually severe and often lethal before or shortly after birth. Reported symptoms include poor mineralization of the skull, craniosynostosis, osteopenia, hypoplastic clavicles and pubic bones, and distinctive craniofacial findings such as low-set ears, hypertelorism, midface hypoplasia, natal teeth, and micrognathia.

Two genetic forms have been described. Bent bone dysplasia syndrome 1 is associated with pathogenic variants in FGFR2, the gene encoding fibroblast growth factor receptor 2. Bent bone dysplasia syndrome 2 has been linked to biallelic variants in LAMA5, which encodes laminin subunit alpha 5.

== Signs and symptoms ==
The disorder may be suspected prenatally when imaging shows bowing of the long bones, especially the femora. Other findings can include a poorly mineralized calvarium, craniosynostosis, small or unusually shaped shaped clavicles, abnormal phalanges, hirsutism, hepatic abnormalities and genitourinary abnormalities. The condition is usually described as perinatal lethal, but longer-term survival has been reported in a small number of individuals.

== Diagnosis ==
Diagnosis is based on the pattern of clinical and radiographic findings, often followed by molecular genetic testing. Prenatal ultrasound or fetal radiography may show long-bone bowing and other skeletal abnormalities, while postnatal evaluation may include skeletal survey and sequencing of genes associated with skeletal dysplasia.

== Prognosis ==
Most published cases have involved fetal, neonatal, or early infant death. In the largest early clinical series, three longer-term survivors were reported—all of these required ventilatory support. A later case report described survival into early childhood, suggesting that FGFR2-related bent bone dysplasia is not invariably lethal, although severe complications remain common. The oldest documented individual with BBDS is a 4-year-old male (FGFR2 type) known as Michael, who is still living as of 2026, he is making developmental progress and is able to walk and interact with others, in addition to congenital hearing loss.

== See also ==
- Osteochondrodysplasia (skeletal dysplasia)
- Campomelic dysplasia
- Raine syndrome
- List of conditions with craniosynostosis
- Rare disease
