= Curry–Jones syndrome =

- Other names: Corpus callosum agenesis-polysyndactyly syndrome
- Specialty: Medical genetics
- Symptoms: Multi-systemic
- Usual onset: Birth
- Duration: Lifelong
- Causes: Mosaic genetic mutation in SMO
- Prevention: None
- Management: Depends on symptoms
- Frequency: 13 cases described in medical literature

Curry–Jones syndrome is a rare genetic disorder characterized by congenital brain, osseous, cutaneous, ocular, and intestinal anomalies.

== Signs and symptoms ==
Individuals with this condition usually have the following symptoms:

- One-sided coronal craniosynostosis
- Multiple suture synostosis
- Agenesis of the corpus callosum that can either be complete or partial
- Polysyndactyly, preaxial type
- Hand/foot syndactyly
- Pearl-white areas in the skin that are prone to scarring and suffer from atrophy
- Eye, cheek, and limb hair growth abnormalities
- Iris coloboma
- Microphthalmia
- Congenital short gut
- Intestinal malrotation
- Dysmotility
- Chronic constipation
- Intestinal bleeding
- Myofibroma

Some individuals may also display the following features:

- Developmental delays
- Variable intellectual disability
- Intra-abdominal smooth muscle hamartomas
- Skin trichoblastoma
- Occipital meningoceles
- Desmoplastic medulloblastoma

== Causes ==
This condition is caused by mosaic missense mutations in the SMO gene on chromosome 7. The causative mutation is typically present in less than 50% of an individual's body tissues. It is suggested that the mutation occurs post-zygotically during early embryonic development.

== Management ==
Management of Curry–Jones syndrome depends on an individual's symptom profile.

== Epidemiology ==
Curry–Jones syndrome has been described in 13 people worldwide.

== Discovery ==
The first case of Curry–Jones syndrome was reported by Cynthia J.R. Curry et al. at the 1987 David W. Smith Workshop on Malformations and Morphogenesis. A similar patient was reported by M.C. Jones. By 1988, it was recognized by the name of Curry–Jones syndrome.
