= Eugène Apert =

French pediatrician (1868–1940)

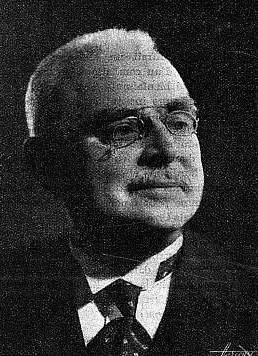
Eugène Apert

Eugène Charles Apert (27 July 1868 – 2 February 1940) was a French pediatrician born in Paris.

He received his doctorate in 1897 and afterwards was associated with the Hôtel-Dieu and Hôpital Saint-Louis. From 1919 until 1934, he worked at the Hôpital des Enfants-Malades in Paris. Pediatrician Jacques-Joseph Grancher (1843–1907) and surgeon Paul Georges Dieulafoy (1839–1911) were important influences on his career. He was also a student of pediatrician Antoine Bernard-Jean Marfan (1858–1942) and collaborated with dermatologist François Henri Hallopeau (1842–1919).

Apert's medical research primarily dealt with genetic diseases and congenital abnormalities. In 1906 he published the case report "De l'acrocéphalosyndactylie" (Acrocephalosyndactyly), documenting several individuals who had congenital malformations of the skull in conjunction with joined fingers. The condition came to be known as Apert syndrome, a syndrome consisting of a triad of disorders; namely, craniosynostosis, syndactyly, and maxillary underdevelopment.

Apert authored many works in pediatrics, including an influential manual on child rearing. He was a founding member of the French Society of Eugenics.
