= Brachyphalangy, polydactyly, and tibial aplasia/hypoplasia =

- Other names: Brachyphalangy, polydactyly and absent tibiae Brachyphalangy, polydactyly, and tibial aplasia-hypoplasia
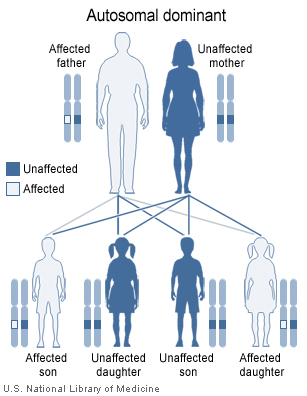
- Autosomal dominant inheritance

Brachyphalangy, polydactyly, and tibial aplasia/hypoplasia is a rare syndrome eponymously characterized by brachyphalangy, polydactyly, and tibial aplasia or hypoplasia.

== Signs and symptoms ==
Features of this condition include:

- Head/neck: blepharophimosis, epicanthus, high palate, short neck, short nose, thin vermilion border, U-shaped upper lip vermilion, wide nasal bridge
- Limbs: absent tibia, aplasia/hypoplasia of the femur, aplasia/hypoplasia of the hallux, aplasia/hypoplasia of the humerus, brachydactyly, broad thumb, clubfoot, dislocated radial head, fibular hypoplasia, hand monodactyly, hypoplasia of the radius, hypoplasia of the ulna, knee flexion contracture, mesomelic leg shortening, metatarsus adductus, patellar hypoplasia, postaxial hand polydactyly, preaxial foot polydactyly, proximal placement of thumb, shallow acetabular fossae, short metacarpal, short phalanx of finger, short toe, split foot, split hand, toe syndactyly
- Cardiovascular system: atrial septal defect, congenital total pulmonary venous return anomaly
- Eyes: hypertelorism, microphthalmia, ptosis
- Integument: antecubital pterygium syndrome, aplasia cutis congenita of scalp, aplasia/hypoplasia of the nails, popliteal pterygium, preauricular skin tag, skin dimple
- Musculoskeletal system: craniosynostosis, delayed skeletal maturation, flared iliac wing, hip dislocation, hypoplastic iliac wing, hypoplastic ischia, hypoplastic pubic ramus, inguinal hernia, microcephaly, micrognathia, parietal foramina, pectus excavatum, short clavicles, short metatarsal, undulate ribs
- Nervous system: global developmental delay, torticollis
- Ears: cupped ear, hearing impairment, overfolded helix
- Urogenital tract: bifid scrotum, clitoral hypoplasia, cryptorchidism, horseshoe kidney, hypospadias, micropenis

== Cause ==
Although presumed to be genetic, the exact cause of this syndrome is not known. The father of one patient diagnosed with this condition was reported to have similar characteristics, suggesting an autosomal dominant inheritance was responsible. Mouse models showed similar symptoms with A1x4 mutations which led to the suggestion that human analogues would have a similar affect, however ALX4 and ALX3 sequencing showed no noticeable alterations.

== History ==
The syndrome was first reported in 1997. Only nine confirmed cases are known to exist, seven being male and two being female.
