= Arthrogryposis, cleft palate, craniosynostosis, and impaired intellectual development =

Rare genetic syndrome

- Other names: ACCIID
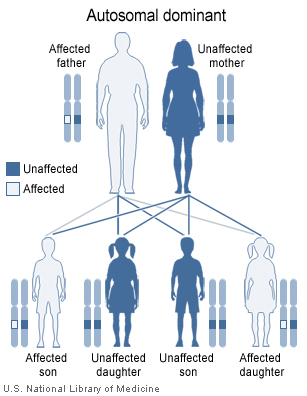
- Autosomal dominant inheritance

Arthrogryposis, cleft palate, craniosynostosis, and impaired intellectual development (ACCIID) is a rare autosomal dominant syndrome eponymously characterized by arthrogryposis, cleft palate, craniosynostosis, and intellectual disability.

== Signs and symptoms ==
Features of this condition include:

- Cleft palate
- Brachydactyly
- Non-immune hydrops fetalis
- Arthrogryposis multiplex congenita
- Craniosynostosis (plagiocephaly and trigonocephaly)
- Decreased calvarial ossification
- Micrognathia
- Retrognathia
- Slender long bone
- Thin ribs
- Generalized-onset seizure
- Global developmental delay
- Intellectual disability
- Decreased body weight
- Short stature
- Hydronephrosis
- Vesicoureteral reflux

== Cause ==
ACCIID is caused by a heterozygous mutation on PPP3CA on chromosome 4q24.

== History ==
This condition was first described in 2018 in two unrelated children, a 5-year-old girl and a 7-year-old boy.
