= Aurocephalosyndactyly =

- Other names: Auralcephalosyndactyly, Kurczynski-Casperson syndrome
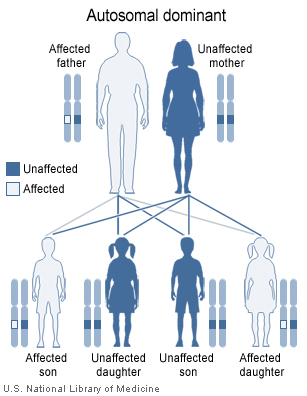
- Autosomal dominant inheritance

Aurocephalosyndactyly, also known as Kurczynski-Casperson syndrome, is a rare autosomal dominant syndrome most notably characterized by craniosynostosis.

== Signs and symptoms ==
Features of this condition include:

- Short columella
- 4-5 toe syndactyly
- Abnormal cardiovascular system morphology
- Craniosynostosis
- Mild intellectual disability
- Hearing impairment

== History ==
The only diagnosed cases of aurocephalosyndactyly were all made in a single family in 1988. Three males (including one who died as an infant) and one female in one generation and another female in the following generation were all diagnosed with the previously unknown condition. The father of the four adults and his siblings may have also had the condition.
