= 15q overgrowth syndrome =

- Other names: 15q26 overgrowth syndrome

15q overgrowth syndrome is a rare partial autosomal trisomy/tetrasomy syndrome. The condition was first identified in a 2009 report.

== Signs and symptoms ==
Features of this condition include:

- Facial dysmorphism (long thin face, prominent forehead, down-slanting palpebral fissures, prominent nose with broad nasal bridge, and prominent chin)
- Overgrowth (pre- and post-natal)
- Renal anomalies (horseshoe kidney, renal agenesis, and hydronephrosis)
- Mild to severe learning difficulties
- Behavioural anomalies

Macrocephaly and craniosynostosis may also be present.

== Causes ==
The cause of this condition is genetic but its origins are unclear. The condition may be inherited (fashion unknown) or not inherited.
