= Cloverleaf skull-multiple congenital anomalies syndrome =

- Specialty: Medical genetics

Cloverleaf skull-multiple congenital anomalies syndrome is a rare autosomal recessive form of lethal short-limb bone dysplasia characterized by cloverleaf skull, limb anomalies, facial dysmorphism, and multiple congenital anomalies. Clinical and radiological abnormalities observed in this condition include short hands, frontal bossing, wide anterior fontanelle, hypertelorism, bilateral microphthalmia, cataract, low-set ears, narrow chest, ambiguous genitalia, cardiac ventricular septal defect, agenesis of the corpus callosum, hypoplastic clavicles and scapulas, thin and wavy cupped ribs, flat vertebral bodies, and hypoossification of the pubic bone. The condition was first described in 2002 in three Arab siblings (two female and one male) born to healthy consanguineous parents.
