= Agammaglobulinemia-microcephaly-craniosynostosis-severe dermatitis syndrome =

- Other names: Agammaglobulinemia, microcephaly, and severe dermatitis
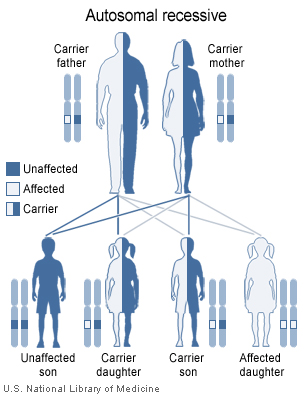

Agammaglobulinemia-microcephaly-craniosynostosis-severe dermatitis syndrome is a rare autosomal recessive syndromic form of agammaglobulinemia that is caused by profound B-cell depletion with normal T-cell numbers. The condition was first identified in a 2006 report.

== Signs and symptoms ==
Features of this condition include:

- Agammaglobulinemia associated with severe developmental delay
- Microcephaly
- Craniosynostosis
- Cleft palate
- Narrowing of the choanae
- Blepharophimosis
- Severe dermatitis

Distal joint contractures, renal/genitourinary anomalies, and mild cerebral atrophy have also been reported.

== Causes ==
This condition is known to be genetic, but the gene(s) responsible are yet to be identified.
