= FTH =

FTH may refer to:

- Fathom, a unit of length
- Full Time Hobby, a British record label
- Future Transport Helicopter, a proposed transport helicopter
