= Raine syndrome =

Osteosclerotic bone dysplasia, a congenital disorder

- Other names: Lethal osteosclerotic bone dysplasia
- This condition is inherited in an autosomal recessive manner

Raine syndrome (RNS), also called osteosclerotic bone dysplasia, is a rare autosomal recessive congenital disorder characterized by craniofacial anomalies including microcephaly, noticeably low set ears, osteosclerosis, a cleft palate, gum hyperplasia, a hypoplastic nose, and eye proptosis. It is considered to be a lethal disease, and usually leads to death within a few hours of birth. However, a recent report describes two studies in which children with Raine syndrome have lived to 8 and 11 years old, so it is currently proposed that there is a milder expression that the phenotype can take (Simpson 2009).

== Signs and symptoms ==
- Dental pain
- Cavities and dental issues
- Bone aches and pains
- Other chronic health issues
- Tiredness
- Aches

== Genetics ==
Raine syndrome appears to be an autosomal recessive disease. There are reports of recurrence in children born of the same parents, and an increased occurrence in children of closely related, genetically similar parents. Individuals with Raine syndrome were either homozygous or compound heterozygous for the mutation of FAM20C. Also observed have been nonsynonymous mutation and splice-site changes (Simpson et al. 2007).

FAM20C, located on chromosome 7p22.3, is an important molecule in bone development. Studies in mice have demonstrated its importance in the mineralization of bones in teeth in early development (OMIM, Simpson et al. 2007, Wang et al. 2010). FAM20C stands for "family with sequence similarity 20, member C." It is also commonly referred to as DMP-4. It is a Golgi-enriched fraction casein kinase and an extracellular serine/threonine protein kinase. It is 107,743 bases long, with 10 exons and 584 amino acids (Weizmann Institute of Science).

== Research ==
Current research describes Raine syndrome as a neonatal osteosclerotic bone dysplasia, indicated by its osteosclerotic symptoms that are seen in those with the disease. It has been found that a mutation in the gene FAM20C is the cause of the Raine syndrome phenotype. This microdeletion mutation leads to an unusual chromosome 7 arrangement. The milder phenotypes of Raine syndrome, such as those described in Simpson's 2007 report, suggest that Raine syndrome resulting from missense mutations may not be as lethal as the other described mutations (OMIM). This is supported by findings from Fradin et al. (2011), who reported on children with missense mutations to FAM20C and lived to ages 1 and 4 years, relatively much longer than the life spans of the previously reported children. Simpson et al.'s (2007) report states that to date, affected individuals have had chromosome 7 uniparental isodisomy and a 7p telomeric microdeletion. They had abnormal chromosome 7 arrangements, with microdeletions of their D7S2477 and D7S1484 markers (Simpson 2007).

== History ==
It was first characterized in 1991 in a report by J. Raine published on an infant that had been born with an unknown syndrome, which later came to be called Raine syndrome. In 2020, the first patient with Raine syndrome gave birth to a child. That child is a carrier and was born premature at 1 pounds due to mother's health. The child is not affected but has chance to pass on the disorder to their children. The patient born in BC had multiple dental surgeries to help fix the symptoms of Raine syndrome but her chronic illnesses affect daily.
