= Cloverleaf skull-asphyxiating thoracic dysplasia syndrome =

- Other names: Benallegue Lacete syndrome
- Specialty: Medical genetics

Cloverleaf skull-asphyxiating thoracic dysplasia syndrome, also known as Benallegue Lacete syndrome, is an extremely rare form of syndromic craniosynostosis characterized by cloverleaf skull, micromelia, and apshyxiating thoracic dysplasia. Radiologic features of this condition include short ribs, horizontal roof of the acetabulum, deformed long bones, and absent ossification of the terminal phalanges. The condition was last formally diagnosed in 1987.
