= Bonnemann-Meinecke-Reich syndrome =

- Other names: Encephalopathy with intracranial calcification, growth hormone deficiency, microcephaly, and retinal degeneration
- Frequency: 0.0001%

Bonnemann-Meinecke-Reich syndrome is a rare form of encephalopathy presenting as psychomotor retardation and characterized by intracranial calcification, growth hormone deficiency, microcephaly, and retinal degeneration.

== Signs and symptoms ==
Features of this condition include:

- Psychomotor retardation
- Moderate dysmorphia
- Craniosynostosis
- Dwarfism
- Intellectual disability
- Spasticity
- Ataxia
- Retinal degeneration
- Adrenal and uterine hypoplasia

== Cause ==
The cause of Bonnemann-Meinecke-Reich syndrome is not known for certain, however autosomal recessive inheritance is speculated to be responsible based on observed cases.

== History ==
Only four patients have ever been diagnosed with Bonnemann-Meinecke-Reich syndrome, both being two sets of siblings from two separate families. The first were a pair of monozygotic twins who were among 14 patients in a report on new cases of encephalopathy with basal ganglia calcification in children in 1989, and the second were two sisters who both developed symptoms during their first year of life which were differentiated from those seen in Cockayne syndrome in 1991.
