= Craniosynostosis-fibular aplasia syndrome =

- Other names: Craniosynostosis with fibular aplasia Lowry syndrome

Craniosynostosis-fibular aplasia syndrome (also known as craniosynostosis with fibular aplasia or Lowry syndrome) is a rare syndrome characterized by bicoronal craniosynostosis, absent fibula, cryptorchidism, and bilateral simian creases.

== Signs and symptoms ==
Features of this condition include:

- Limbs: fibular aplasia, single transverse palmar crease
- Genitourinary system: cryptorchidism
- Musculoskeletal system: craniosynostosis

== History ==
The first (and only) reported cases of this syndrome were two brothers first described in 1972. Both had normal intelligence. A follow-up report was made on one the brothers in 1993 at age 25 with two years of college education.

== Causes ==
This condition is genetic but little is known of its cause. Autosomal recessive inheritance has been suggested.
