= Cynthia J. Curry =

American pediatric geneticist

- Education: Mount Holyoke College; Yale School of Medicine
- Scientific career
- Fields: Clinical genetics, pediatrics
- Workplaces: University of California, San Francisco; Stanford University

Cynthia J. Curry is an American clinical geneticist and professor emerita of pediatrics at the University of California, San Francisco (UCSF). She is also an adjunct professor of pediatrics at Stanford University.

Her research has focused on the delineation of genetic syndromes in fetuses and newborns and the causes of intellectual disability. She has practised clinical genetics in Fresno, California.

== Education ==
Curry received an AB in zoology from Mount Holyoke College in 1963 and an MD from Yale School of Medicine in 1967. She completed pediatric training at the University of Washington and the University of Minnesota, followed by training in genetics at the University of California, San Francisco.

== Research ==
Curry's research interests include syndrome delineation in fetuses and newborns and the causes of intellectual disability. Curry is the author of more than 140 articles and chapters. In 2019, Curry and clinical geneticist Robin D. Clark published ''Genetic Consultations in the Newborn'' through Oxford University Press.

== Career ==
She is on the scientific advisory board of AI-phenotyping company Face2Gene and works with the State of California Birth Defects Monitoring Program.

== Awards ==
Curry received the American Academy of Pediatrics' David W. Smith Excellence in Genetics Education Award in 2014 and the Western Society for Pediatric Research's Joseph St. Geme Education Award in 2020.
