= Craniosynostosis, Adelaide type =

- Other names: CRSA

Craniosynostosis, Adelaide type (CRSA) is a syndrome characterized by cone-shaped epiphyses, phalangeal hypoplasia, and carpal bone malsegmentation along with craniosynostosis.

== Signs and symptoms ==
Features of this condition include:

- Limbs: carpal bone malsegmentation, hallux valgus, shortening of all distal phalanges of the fingers, shortening of all middle phalanges of the fingers
- Musculoskeletal system: cone-shaped epiphyses of the phalanges of the hand, cone-shaped epiphyses of the toes, craniosynostosis

== History ==
This condition was first reported in 1994 in a southern Australian family. The family was initially thought to have Jackson-Weiss syndrome, however further testing in 1995 determined the condition was excluded from the allelism of other craniosynostosis syndromes.

== Causes ==
The condition's exact genetic origin is not known with certainty, but 2 plausible candidate genes (MSX1 and FGFR3) have been identified through limitation down to chromosome 4.
