= Craniosynostosis with anomalies of the cranial base and digits =

Craniosynostosis with anomalies of the cranial base and digits is a syndrome characterized by atypical development in a fetus's limbs and skull. People with this condition are often missing the middle parts of the second and fifth fingers, as well as their thumbs, though the thumbs may be improperly positioned. The big toes may also be missing or improperly positioned. Additionally, the bones in the skull close too early in development (craniosynostosis), and bones at the skull base grow incorrectly.

Woon et al. first reported the condition in 1980 in a pair of male twins of Mexican American and Sioux Indian ancestry with no chromosomal abnormalities. Both died within 3 months of birth.
