= Craniosynostosis–anal anomalies–porokeratosis syndrome =

- Specialty: Dermatology

Craniosynostosis–anal anomalies–porokeratosis syndrome (also known as "CAP syndrome") is a cutaneous condition inherited in an autosomal recessive fashion.

== See also ==
- Cerebral dysgenesis–neuropathy–ichthyosis–keratoderma syndrome
- List of cutaneous conditions
