= Sakati–Nyhan–Tisdale syndrome =

- Other names: Acrocephalopolysyndactyly type III
- This condition is inherited in an autosomal dominant manner
- Specialty: Medical genetics

Sakati–Nyhan–Tisdale syndrome is a rare genetic disorder that has been associated with abnormalities in the bones of the legs, congenital heart defects and craniofacial defects. The syndrome belongs to a group of rare genetic disorders known as acrocephalopolysyndactyly, or ACPS for short.

== Presentation ==
The syndrome was first reported in an eight-year-old boy, but very few cases have been reported since then. The syndrome is detected by abnormalities noted at birth involving the head, limbs, heart, ears, and skin. It is characterized by premature closure of the fibrous joints between certain bones of the skull in a process known as craniosynostosis. As documented in the first case, affected people tend to develop cyanosis and other respiratory and breathing infections, all before the age of one. Body development subsequently slows down, but some problems can be fixed under proper guidance, such as learning to walk with special crutches by five years of age. Craniofacial problems are present that have no effect on the patient's intelligence and mental growth.

Most problems resulting from the syndrome are physical. It causes acrocephaly, making the head appear pointed, and webbing or syndactyly of certain toes or fingers.

== Causes ==
Although no cause has been officially confirmed, researchers speculate the disease might result from a genetic mutation that sporadically occurs for unknown reasons.

== Eponym ==
The disease was named after a Syrian pediatrician named Nadia Awni Sakati and her two American counterparts, William Leo Nyhan and W.K. Tisdale, who were working alongside her in the pediatrics department at University of California, San Diego. It was characterized in 1971.
