= RAB23 =

Protein-coding gene in humans

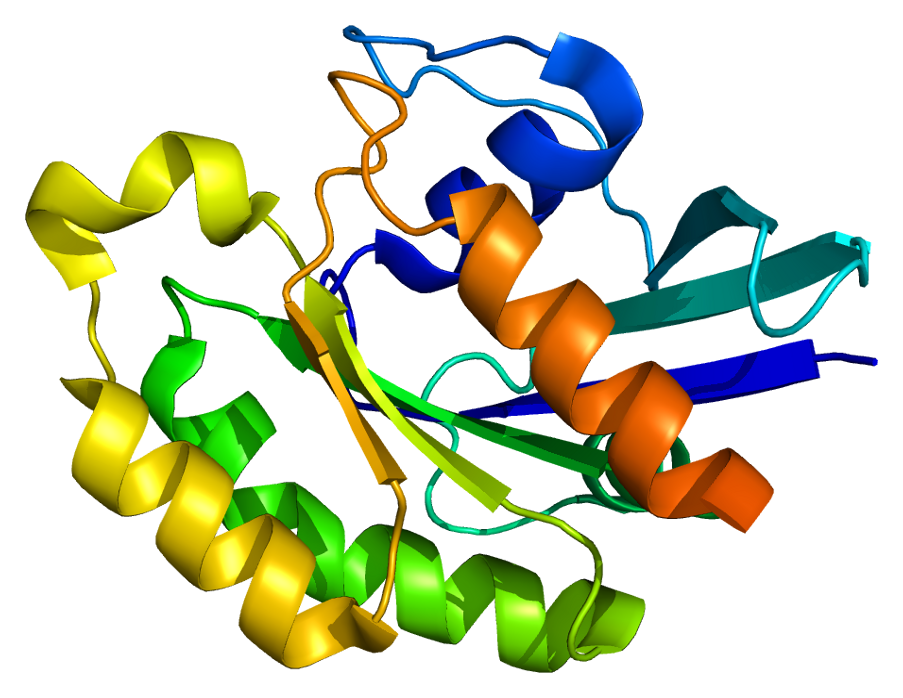

Identifiers
- Aliases: RAB23, HSPC137, member RAS oncogene family
- External IDs: OMIM: 606144; MGI: 99833; GeneCards: RAB23
Enzyme activity
| EC # | BRENDA | ExPASy | KEGG | MetaCyc |
|---|---|---|---|---|
| 3.6.5.2 | ↗ | ↗ | ↗ | ↗ |

Gene location (Human)
| Chr. | Chromosome 6 (human) |
| Band | 6p12.1-p11.2 | Start | 57,186,992 bp |
| Band | 6p12.1-p11.2 | End | 57,222,307 bp |

Gene location (Mouse)
| Chr. | Chromosome 1 (mouse) |
| Band | 1 B|1 12.8 cM | Start | 33,758,968 bp |
| Band | 1 B|1 12.8 cM | End | 33,781,645 bp |
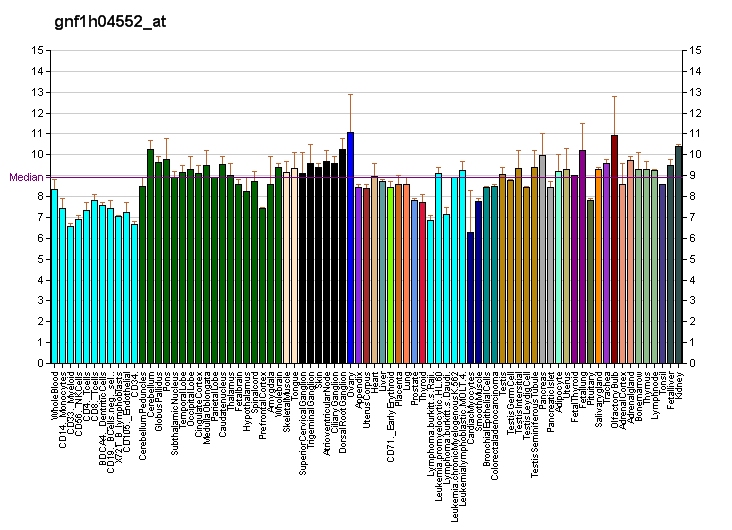

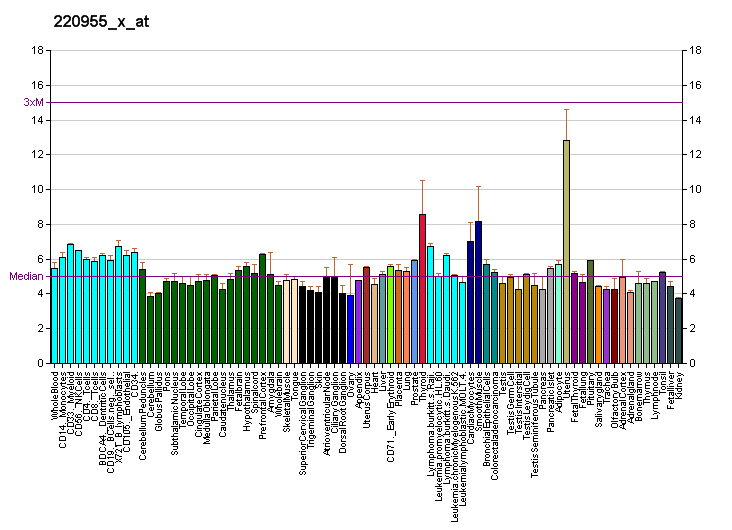
RNA expression pattern
| Bgee | Human / Mouse (ortholog); Top expressed in: tail of epididymis; saphenous vein; secondary oocyte; seminal vesicula; Achilles tendon; urethra; myometrium; muscle layer of sigmoid colon; visceral pleura; body of uterus / Top expressed in: ovarian follicle; ovarian follicle; secondary follicle of ovary; tail of embryo; granulocyte; genital tubercle; secondary oocyte; molar; ventricular zone; ovarian follicle cell; More reference expression data |
| BioGPS | More reference expression data |
Gene ontology
| Molecular function | nucleotide binding; GTP binding; protein binding; GTPase activity |
| Cellular component | cytoplasm; endosome; phagocytic vesicle membrane; membrane; plasma membrane; autophagosome; phagocytic vesicle; endosome membrane; cytoplasmic vesicle; centrosome; cytosol; cell junction |
| Biological process | craniofacial suture morphogenesis; autophagosome assembly; multicellular organism development; cellular defense response; protein transport; cilium assembly; GTP metabolic process; negative regulation of protein import into nucleus; intracellular protein transport; Rab protein signal transduction; signal transduction |
Sources:Amigo / QuickGO
Orthologs
| Databases | NCBI: entry; OMA: entry |
| Species | Human | Mouse |
| Entrez | 51715 | 19335 |
| Ensembl | ENSG00000112210 | ENSMUSG00000004768 |
| UniProt | Q9ULC3 | P35288 |
| RefSeq (mRNA) | NM_001278666; NM_001278667; NM_001278668; NM_016277; NM_183227 | NM_001159729; NM_008999 |
| RefSeq (protein) | NP_001265595; NP_001265596; NP_001265597; NP_057361; NP_899050 | n/a |
| Location (UCSC) | Chr 6: 57.19 – 57.22 Mb | Chr 1: 33.76 – 33.78 Mb |
| PubMed search |
- Wikidata
| View/Edit Human | View/Edit Mouse |

Ras-related protein Rab-23 is a protein that in humans is encoded by the RAB23 gene. Alternative splicing occurs at this gene locus and two transcript variants encoding the same protein have been identified.

== Function ==
RAB23 belongs to the small GTPase superfamily, Rab family. It may be involved in small GTPase mediated signal transduction and intracellular protein transportation.

RAB23 is an essential negative regulator of the Sonic hedgehog signaling pathway. The first understanding of biological processes requiring the Rab23 gene came from 2 independent mouse mutations in the gene and an epistasis analysis with mutations in the mouse shh gene. These studies showed that the gene is required for normal development of the brain and spinal cord and that the morphological defects seen in mutant embryos, such as failure to close dorsal regions of the neural tube during development, appeared secondary to expansion of ventral and reduction of dorsal identities in the developing neural tube. These same mutations implicated the RAB23 gene in development of digits and eyes. The mouse open brain (opb) and Sonic hedgehog (Shh) genes have opposing roles in neural patterning: opb is required for dorsal cell types and Shh is required for ventral cell types in the spinal cord.
