= Lowry–MacLean syndrome =

- This condition is inherited in an autosomal dominant manner.
- Specialty: Dermatology

Lowry–MacLean syndrome is a congenital condition that may be characterized by an ear pit.

== See also ==
- Limb–mammary syndrome
- List of cutaneous conditions
