= Pfeiffer syndrome =

Genetic disorder of the skull

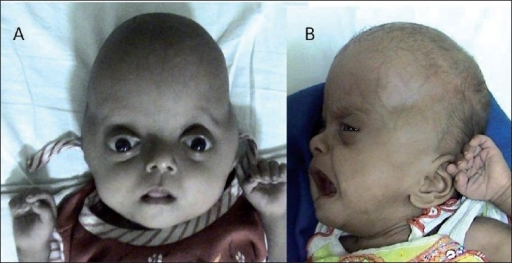
- Pfeiffer syndrome type 2 with cloverleaf-shaped skull and bilateral proptosis before and after surgery
- Specialty: Rheumatology
- Causes: Genetic
- Frequency: 1 per 100,000 births
- Named after: Rudolf Arthur Pfeiffer

Pfeiffer syndrome is a rare genetic disorder, characterized by the premature fusion of certain bones of the skull (craniosynostosis), which affects the shape of the head and face. The syndrome includes abnormalities of the hands and feet, such as wide and deviated thumbs and big toes.

Pfeiffer syndrome is caused by mutations in the fibroblast growth factor receptors FGFR1 and FGFR2. The syndrome is grouped into three types: type 1 (classic Pfeiffer syndrome) is milder and caused by mutations in either gene; types 2 and 3 are more severe, often leading to death in infancy, caused by mutations in FGFR2.

There is no cure for the syndrome. Treatment is supportive and often involves surgery in the earliest years of life to correct skull deformities and respiratory function. Most persons with Pfeiffer syndrome type 1 have a normal intelligence and life span; types 2 and 3 typically cause neurodevelopmental disorders and early death. Later in life, surgery can help in bone formation and facial construction.

Pfeiffer syndrome affects about 1 in 100,000 persons. The syndrome is named after a German geneticist, Rudolf Arthur Pfeiffer (1931–2012), who described it in 1964.

== Signs and symptoms ==
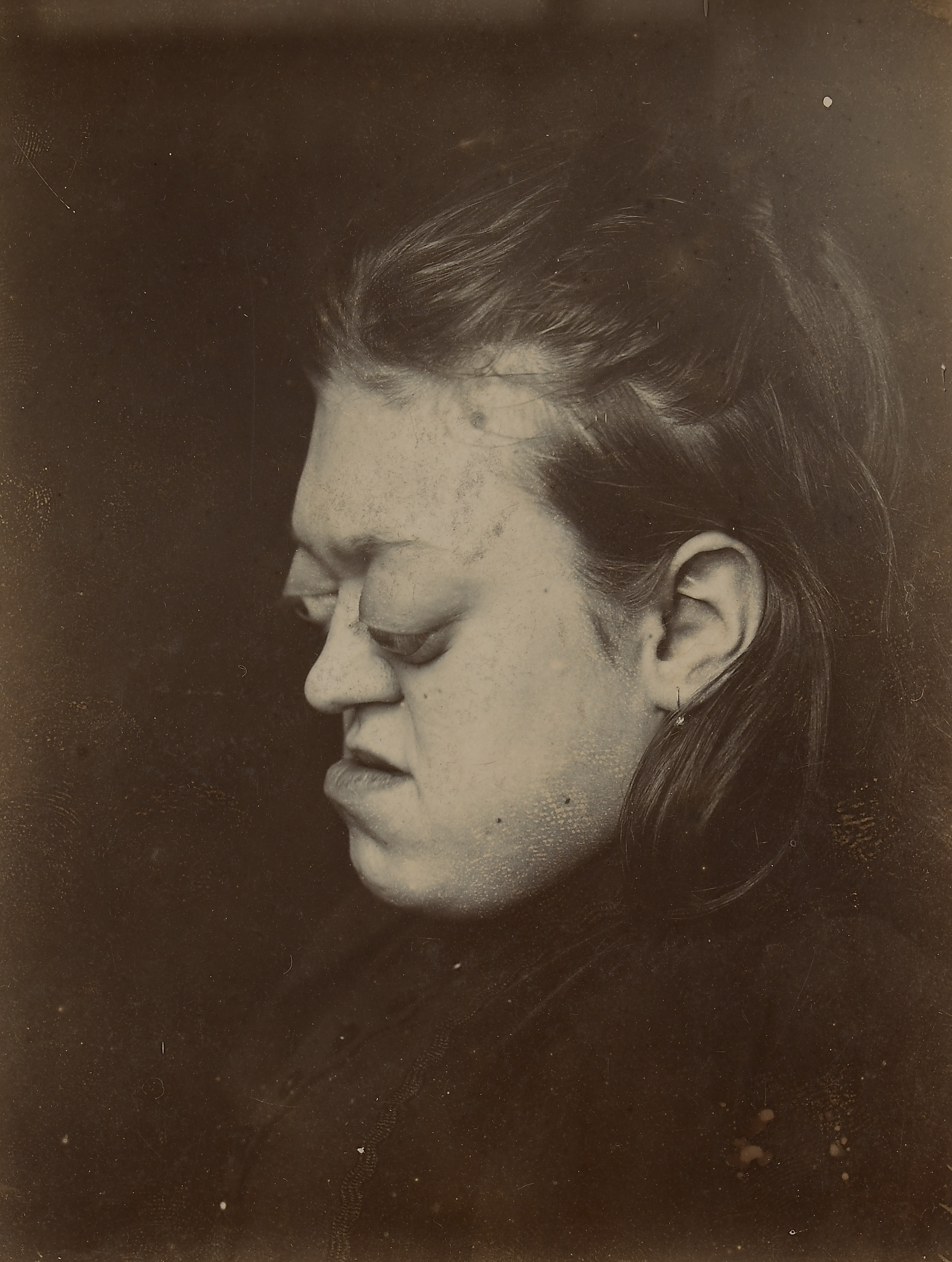
Symptoms of Pfeiffer syndrome in a 17-year-old girl, 1895

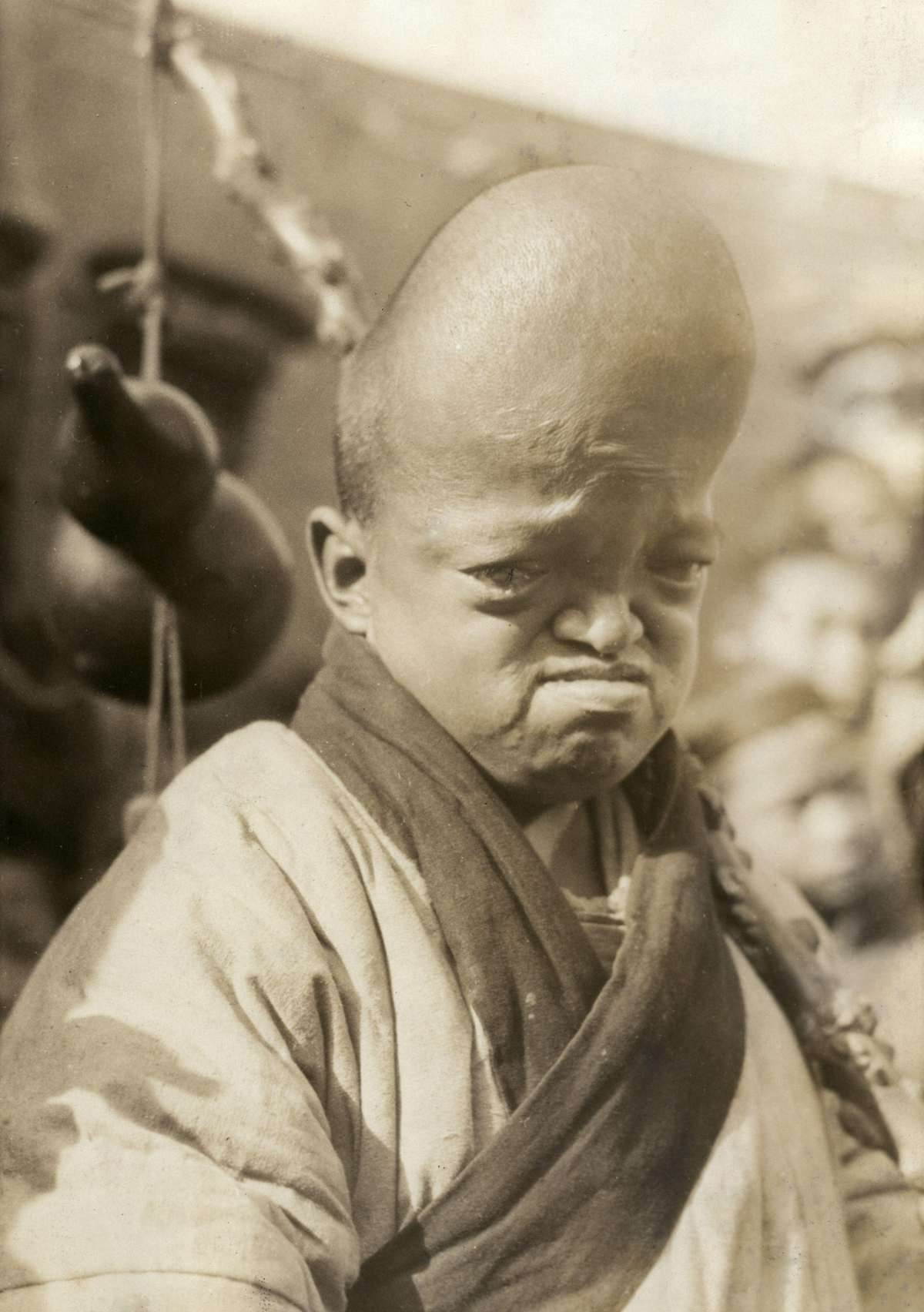
Symptoms of Pfeiffer syndrome in a Chinese circus performer, 1927

Many of the facial characteristics result from the premature fusion of the skull bones (craniosynostosis). The head is unable to grow normally, which leads to a high, prominent forehead (turri brachycephaly) and eyes that appear to bulge (proptosis) and are set wide (hypertelorism). In addition, there is an underdeveloped upper jaw (maxillary hypoplasia). More than half of children with Pfeiffer syndrome have hearing loss; dental problems are common. A baby with Pfeiffer syndrome may have a small, beak-shaped nose; crowded, crooked teeth; and sleep apnea, due to nasal blockage. There are three main types of Pfeiffer syndrome: type I is the mildest and most common; type II is the most severe, with neurological problems and a cloverleaf deformity; and type III is similar to type II, but without the cloverleaf deformity.

In people with Pfeiffer syndrome, the thumbs and first (big) toes are wide and bend away from the other digits (pollex varus and hallux varus). Unusually short fingers and toes (brachydactyly) are also common, and there may be some webbing or fusion between the digits (syndactyly).

== Cause ==
Pfeiffer syndrome is strongly associated with mutations of the fibroblast growth factor receptor 1 (FGFR1) on chromosome 8 or the fibroblast growth factor receptor 2 (FGFR2) gene on chromosome 10. These genes code for fibroblast growth factor receptors, which are important for normal bone development. Advanced paternal age is thought to be a risk factor for sporadic cases of Pfeiffer syndrome due to an increase in mutations in sperm as men become older.

== Diagnosis ==
=== Classification ===
The most widely accepted clinical classification of Pfeiffer syndrome was published by M. Michael Cohen in 1993. Cohen divided the syndrome into three possibly overlapping types, all of which are characterized by broad thumbs, broad great toes, brachydactyly and possibly syndactyly:

- Type 1, also known as classic Pfeiffer syndrome, includes craniosynostosis and "midface deficiency". This type is inherited in an autosomal dominant pattern. Most individuals with type 1 Pfeiffer syndrome have normal intelligence and a normal life span.
- Type 2 includes a cloverleaf-shaped skull, due to extensive fusion of bones, as well as severe proptosis. This type occurs sporadically (i.e., does not appear to be inherited) and has "a poor prognosis and severe neurological compromise, generally with early death".
- Type 3 includes craniosynostosis and severe proptosis. This type occurs sporadically (i.e., does not appear to be inherited) and has "a poor prognosis and severe neurological compromise, generally with early death."

== Management ==
The key problem is the early fusion of the skull, which can be corrected by a series of surgical procedures, often within the first three months after birth. Later surgeries are necessary to correct respiratory and facial deformities.

== Outcomes ==
Children with Pfeiffer syndrome types 2 and 3 "have a higher risk for neurodevelopmental disorders and a reduced life expectancy" than children with Pfeiffer syndrome type 1, but if treated, favorable outcomes are possible. In severe cases, respiratory and neurological complications often lead to early death.

== History ==
The syndrome is named after German geneticist Rudolf Arthur Pfeiffer (1931–2012). In 1964, Pfeiffer described eight individuals in three generations of a family who had abnormalities of the head, hands and feet (acrocephalosyndactylia) that were inherited in an autosomal dominant pattern.

== Notable individuals ==
- In 1996, a son was born to American musician Prince and his wife Mayte Garcia. The boy, Amiir, was diagnosed at birth with Pfeiffer syndrome type 2 and died several days later. In 1997, after Garcia's former personal assistants raised concerns about the manner of death, the medical examiner performed an investigation and declared that the death was due to natural causes.
- In 2014, the mother of a boy in Texas with Pfeiffer syndrome type 1 posted a photograph of the child to her blog. In 2016, she discovered that the photograph had been used in a meme comparing her son to a pug. Her efforts to remove the meme from the Internet, especially social media such as Instagram, Twitter, and Facebook, attracted international attention.
