= CEBALID syndrome =

- Other names: CEBALID; Craniofacial defects, dysmorphic ears, structural brain anomalies, expressive language delay, and impaired intellectual development MN1 C-terminal truncation syndrome
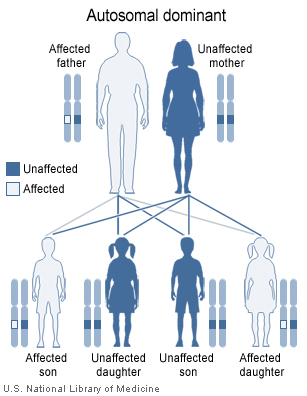
- Autosomal dominant inheritance
- Specialty: Medical genetics, neurology, ophthalmology, surgery, physical medicine
- Symptoms: Craniofacial abnormalities, dysmorphic features, brain anomalies, language delay, intellectual disability
- Usual onset: Congenital
- Duration: Lifelong
- Causes: MN1 mutations, inherited or de novo
- Diagnostic method: Genetic testing
- Differential diagnosis: Gomez-Lopez-Hernandez syndrome
- Management: Surgical and therapeutic interventions
- Prognosis: Likely normal lifespan
- Frequency: Likely 4.2:10,000 in individuals with unexplained developmental disorders

CEBALID syndrome is a rare autosomal dominant disorder whose name is an acronym of its main features: craniofacial defects, dysmorphic ears, structural brain anomalies, expressive language delay, and impaired intellectual development.

== Signs and symptoms ==
The characteristic clinical features of CEBALID syndrome are mild to moderate intellectual disability, severe expressive language delay, dysmorphic facial features, and distinctive brain imaging results. A minority of patients exhibit seizures. This condition also carries an increased risk for craniosynostosis, and therefore an increased risk of higher intracranial pressure. Patients with hearing loss exhibited it to a mild or moderate degree. Feeding difficulties are seen in infancy but may resolve after age one. Other features observed in patients include spinal anomalies (lordosis, scoliosis, or kyphosis), dental anomalies (conical teeth, crowded teeth, and serrated teeth), ophthalmologic anomalies, and cardiovascular anomalies (atrial septal defect or ventricular septal defect). Behavioral issues have been observed from frustration due to communication difficulties, but it is unclear if these persistently develop into adulthood.

All known features of this condition include:

- Head and neck: anteverted nares, depressed nasal bridge, depressed nasal ridge, downslanted palpebral fissures, flat face, high palate, highly arched eyebrows, midface retrusion, narrow forehead, prominent forehead, short nose, thick eyebrows
- Digestive system: feeding difficulties
- Eyes: Duane retraction syndrome, hypertelorism, nystagmus, strabismus
- Musculoskeletal system: brachycephaly, congenital diaphragmatic hernia, dolichocephaly, generalized hypotonia, plagiocephaly, platystencephaly, turricephaly
- Nervous system: abnormal speech pattern, delayed speech and language development, intellectual disability, motor delay, polymicrogyria, polyphagia, seizure, severe global developmental delay
- Ears: abnormal pinna morphology, hearing impairment, low-set ears, posteriorly rotated ears

== Cause ==
CEBALID syndrome is an autosomal dominant disorder usually caused by a MN1 pathogenic variant on chromosome 22q12. Among the 25 patients diagnosed with this condition, all either inherited the pathogenic variant from a mosaic parent or displayed a de novo mutation without family history.

== Diagnosis ==
CEBALID syndrome is formally diagnosed through genetic testing. This can be done through single-gene sequence analysis of MN1 for missense, nonsense, and splice site mutations or comprehensive genomic testing such as exome sequencing or genome sequencing.

== Management ==
The treatment of CEBALID syndrome includes oral and maxillofacial surgery, alternative communication techniques, anti-seizure medication, feeding therapy, physical therapy, hearing aids, and regular community and medical monitoring.

== Prognosis ==
Although it is not known for certain if CEBALID syndrome affects lifespan, patients as old as 21 and 39 years old have been reported, suggesting most patients can survive into adulthood and that many adults with the condition may be undiagnosed due to lack of advanced genetic testing among most adults with disabilities.

== History ==
As of 2020, 25 individuals had been reported with CEBALID syndrome. 23 presented the syndrome individually with the remaining two being a set pair brothers. All 25 patients were described in 2020 across two separate reports.
