= Chromosome 5p13 duplication syndrome =

- Specialty: Medical genetics
- Causes: Chromosome 5 mutations
- Differential diagnosis: Cornelia de Lange syndrome

Chromosome 5p13 duplication syndrome is a rare partial autosomal trisomy/tetrasomy disorder characterized by global developmental delay, intellectual disability, autistic behavior, muscular hypotonia, macrocephaly, and facial dysmorphism.

== Signs and symptoms ==
Features of this condition include:

- Head and neck: blepharophimosis, broad forehead, bulbous nose, downturned corners of mouth, epicanthus, high palate, long palpebral fissure, low hanging columella, low posterior hairline, narrow forehead, short palpebral fissure, wide nasal bridge
- Limbs: large hands, long fingers, long feet, single transverse palmar crease
- Eyes: astigmatism, esotropia, exotropia, hypertelorism, hypotelorism, proptosis, strabismus
- Integument: sparse hair
- Musculoskeletal system: brachycephaly, craniosynostosis, frontal bossing, hypotonia, macrocephaly, scoliosis, turricephaly
- Nervous system: compulsive behavior, corpus callosum agenesis, global developmental delay, intellectual disability, motor stereotypies, seizure, self-injurious behavior, sleep disturbance
- Ear malformations: low-set ears, posteriorly rotated ears
- Growth abnormality: small for gestational age
- Urogenital tract malformation: vesicoureteral reflux

== Cause ==
Chromosome 5p13 duplication syndrome is caused by de novo microduplications of NIPBL, FLJ13231, SLC1A3, NUP155, and WDR70 on the eponymous chromsome 5p13. Patients presented with varying levels of duplication and gene involvement individually. Whether the condition is inherited or not remains unclear.

== History ==
Chromosome 5p13 duplication syndrome was first described in 2009 in five patients, four female and one male, aged 6 months to 30 years old. These five individuals are the only people to have been formally diagnosed with the condition.
