= Craniosynostosis and dental anomalies =

- Other names: CRSDA; Kreiborg-Pakistani syndrome
- Autosomal recessive inheritance
- Specialty: Medical genetics

Craniosynostosis and dental anomalies (CRSDA, also known as Kreiborg-Pakistani syndrome) is an autosomal recessive syndrome characterized by craniosynostosis, maxillary hypoplasia, and dental anomalies. Dental anomalies seen in this condition include malocclusion, delayed and ectopic tooth eruption, and/or supernumerary teeth. Syndactyly, clinodactyly, and other digit anomalies may also be present.

== Signs and symptoms ==
Features of this condition include, by area affected:

- Head or neck: convex nasal ridge, delayed tooth eruption, dental crowding, dental malocclusion, depressed nasal bridge, downslanted palpebral fissures, flat forehead, high forehead, high palate, mandibular prognathia, midface retrusion, narrow palate, sloping forehead, supernumerary teeth, and wide nose
- Limbs: two or three-toe syndactyly, broad hallux, clinodactyly, hallux valgus, short phalanx of finger
- Eyes: hypertelorism, pailledema, proptosis
- Immune system: chronic otitis media
- Integument: fingernail dysplasia
- Musculoskeletal system: brachycephaly, coronal synostosis, dolichocephaly, flat occiput, frontal bossing, maxilla hypoplasia, scaphocephaly, metopic synostosis, oxycephaly, prominent metopic ridge, sagittal craniosynostosis, trigonocephaly, turricephaly
- Nervous system: Chiari malformation, seizures, syringomelia
- Ears: absent malleus, conductive hearing impairment, stapes ankylosis
- Growth: short stature

== Causes ==
CRSDA is caused by homozygous or compound heterozygous mutations on the IL11RA gene in the short arm of chromosome 9.

== See also ==
- Crouzon syndrome
