= Trigonocephaly =

Skull malformation such that the forehead is triangular

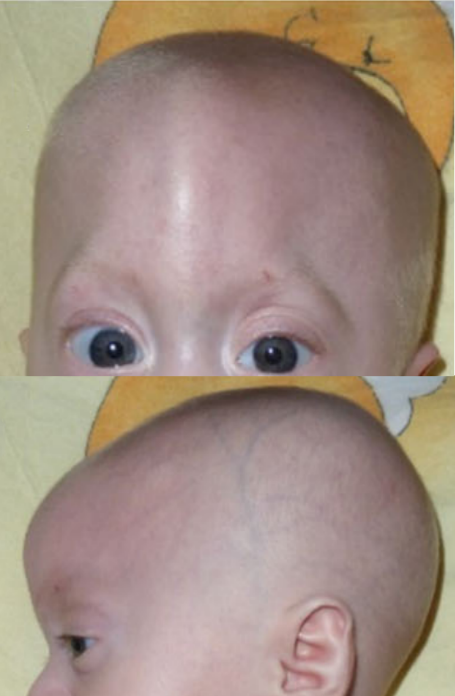
- Trigonocephaly in a boy with 1q22–1q23.1 duplication
- Specialty: Medical genetics

Trigonocephaly is a congenital condition due to premature fusion of the metopic suture (from Ancient Greek metopon 'forehead'), leading to a triangular forehead. The premature merging of the two frontal bones leads to transverse growth restriction and parallel growth expansion. It may occur as one component of a syndrome together with other abnormalities, or in isolated form. The term is from Ancient Greek trigonon 'triangle' and kephale 'head'.

== Cause ==
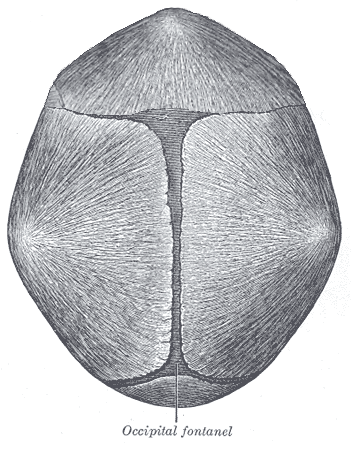
Fused suture in trigonocephaly

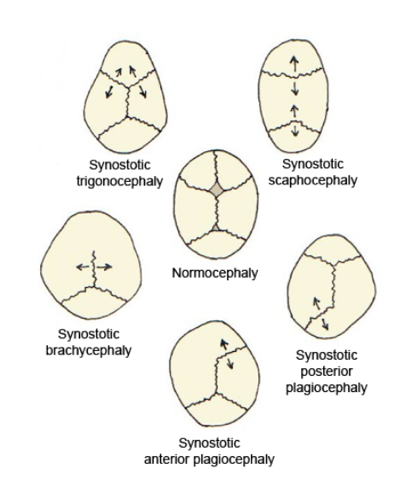
Trigonocephaly as a kind of craniosynostosis

Trigonocephaly can either occur in a syndrome or isolated, all by itself. Trigonocephaly is associated with the following syndromes: Bohring-Opitz syndrome, Muenke syndrome, Jacobsen syndrome, Baller–Gerold syndrome and Say–Meyer syndrome. The etiology of trigonocephaly is mostly unknown although there are three main theories. Trigonocephaly is probably a multifactorial congenital condition, but due to limited proof of these theories this cannot safely be concluded.

=== Intrinsic bone malformation ===
The first theory assumes that the origin of pathological synostosis lies within disturbed bone formation early on in the pregnancy. Causes can either be genetic (9p22–24, 11q23, 22q11, FGFR1 mutation), metabolic (TSH suppletion in hypothyroidism) or pharmaceutical (valproate in epilepsy).

=== Fetal-head constraint ===
The second theory says that synostosis begins when the fetal head gets hindered in the pelvic outlet during birth.

=== Intrinsic brain malformation ===
The third theory predominates disturbed brain formation of the two frontal lobes as the main issue behind synostosis. Limited growth of the frontal lobes leads to an absence of stimuli for cranial growth, therefore causing premature fusion of the metopic suture.

=== Other conditions and syndromes ===
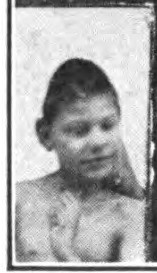
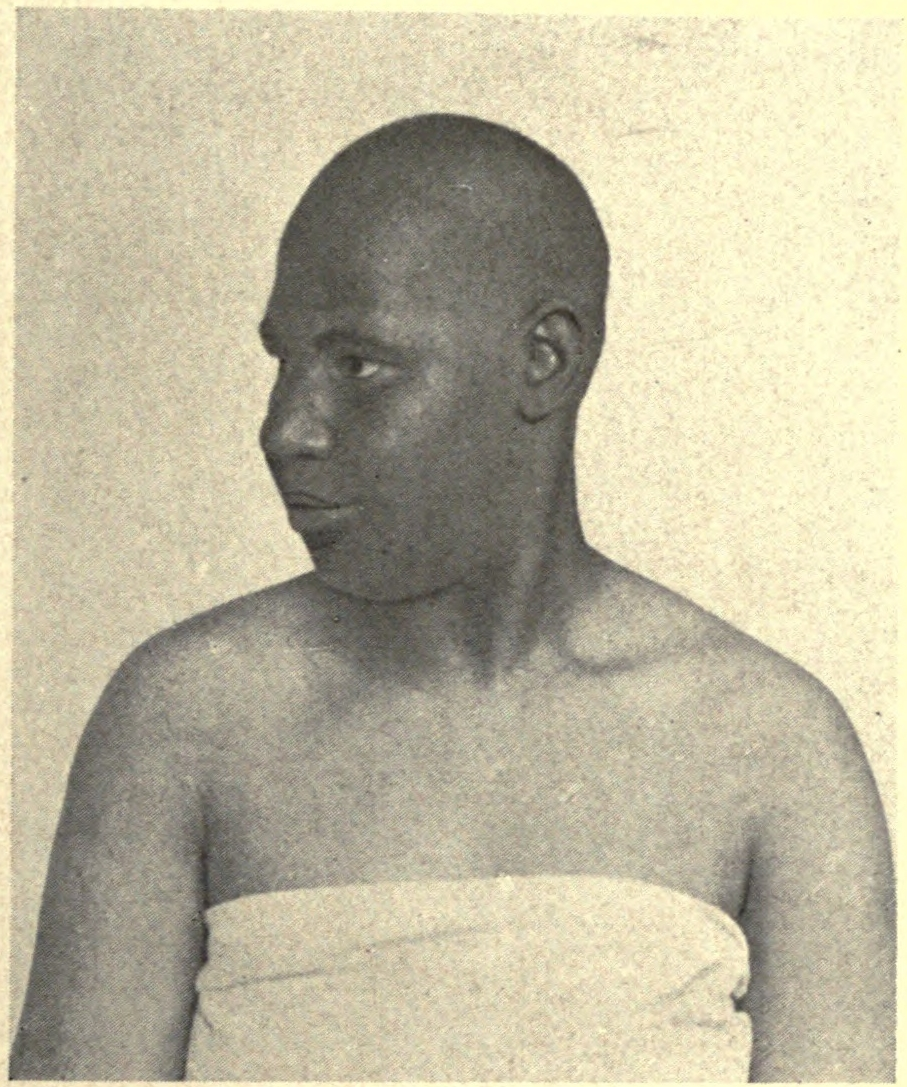
Trigonocephaly in two cases of microcephaly

Other conditions and syndromes with trigonocephaly include:

- Arthrogryposis, cleft palate, craniosynostosis, and impaired intellectual development
- Atypical glycine encephalopathy
- Blepharophimosis-intellectual disability syndrome, Verloes type
- Bohring-Opitz syndrome
- Coffin-Siris syndrome
- Greig cephalopolysyndactyly syndrome
- Holoprosencephaly
- Mandibulofacial dysostosis-microcephaly syndrome
- MEGF8-related Carpenter syndrome
- Microcephaly, primary autosomal dominant
- Mucolipidosis type II
- Orofaciodigital syndrome type 14
- Paris-Trousseau thrombocytopenia
- Potocki-Lupski syndrome
- Simpson-Golabi-Behmel syndrome type 1
- Trichothiodystrophy, photosensitive
- Trigonocephaly-bifid nose-acral anomalies syndrome

== Diagnosis ==
Diagnosis can be characterized by typical facial and cranial deformities.

Observatory signs of trigonocephaly are:

- a triangular forehead seen from top view leading to a smaller anterior cranial fossa
- a visible and palpable midline ridge
- hypotelorism inducing ethmoidal hypoplasia

Imaging techniques (3D-CT, röntgenography, MRI) show:

- epicanthal folds in limited cases
- teardrop-shaped orbits angulated towards the midline of the forehead ('surprised coon' sign) in severe cases
- a contrast difference between a röntgenograph of a normal and a trigonocephalic skull
- anterior curving of the metopic suture seen from lateral view of the cranium on a röntgenograph
- a normal cephalic index (maximum cranium width / maximum cranium length) however, there is bitemporal shortening and biparietal broadening

The neuropsychological development is not always affected. These effects are only visible in a small percentage of children with trigonocephaly or other suture synostoses.

Neuropsychological signs are:

- problems in behaviour, speech and language
- intellectual disability
- neurodevelopmental delays such as attention deficit hyperactivity disorder (ADHD), oppositional defiant disorder (ODD), autism spectrum disorder (ASD), and conduct disorder (CD). Many of these delays become evident at school age.

== Treatment ==
Treatment is surgical with attention to form and volume. Surgery usually takes place before the age of one since it has been reported that the intellectual outcome is better.

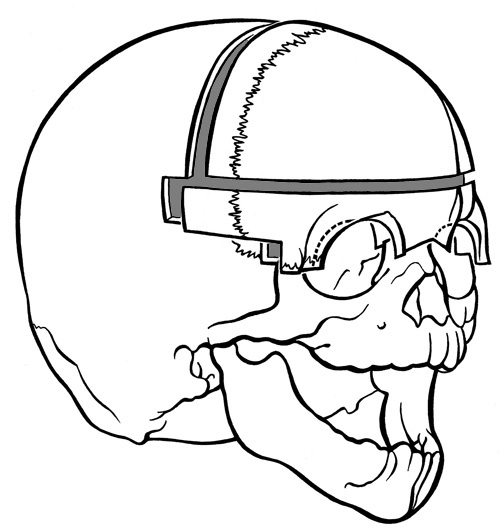
A. Fronto-supraorbital advancement and remodelling – before remodelling

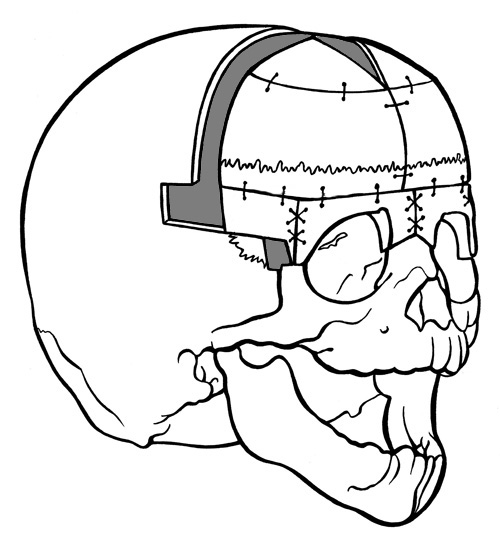
B. Fronto-supraorbital advancement and remodelling – after remodelling

=== Fronto-supraorbital advancement and remodelling ===
A form of surgery is the so-called fronto-supraorbital advancement and remodelling. Firstly, the supraorbital bar is remodelled by a wired greenstick fracture to straighten it. Secondly, the supraorbital bar is moved 2 cm. forward and fixed only to the frontal process of the zygoma without fixation to the cranium. Lastly, the frontal bone is divided into two, rotated and attached to the supraorbital bar causing a nude area (craniectomy) between the parietal bone and frontal bone. Bone will eventually regenerate since the dura mater lies underneath (the dura mater has osteogenic capabilities). This results in an advancement and straightening of the forehead.

=== 'Floating forehead technique' ===
The so-called 'floating forehead technique' combined with the remodelling of the supraorbital bar is derived from the fronto-supraorbital advancement and remodelling. The supraorbital bar is remodelled as described above. The frontal bone is split in two pieces. Instead of using both pieces as in fronto-supraorbital advancement and remodelling, only one piece is rotated and attached to the supraorbital bar. This technique also leaves a craniectomy behind.

=== Other ===
- Suturectomy

The simplest form of surgery for trigonocephaly was suturectomy. However, as this technique was insufficient to correct the deformities, it is not used anymore.

- Distraction osteogenesis

Distraction osteogenesis is based on creating more cranial space for the brain by gradually moving the bones apart. This can be achieved by using springs.

- Minimal invasive endoscopic surgery

These approaches are 2D solutions for a 3D problem, therefore the results are not optimal. Distraction osteogenesis and minimal invasive endoscopic surgery are yet in experimental phase.

== Outcomes ==
=== Surgical ===
Trigonocephaly seems to be the most compliant form of craniosynostosis for surgery. Because of standardization of current surgical approaches there is no surgical mortality and complications are few to none. The simple suturectomy is presently insufficient to adjust the complicated growth restrictions caused by metopic synostosis. On the other hand, the fronto-supraorbital advancement and remodelling and the 'floating forehead technique' create sufficient space for brain growth and result in a normal horizontal axis of the orbits and supraorbital bar. The fronto-supraorbital advancement and remodelling is the most used method nowadays. Over the past few years distraction osteogenesis has been gradually acknowledged since it has a positive effect on hypotelorism. Expanding the distance between the orbits using springs seems to be successful. However, there are discussions whether hypotelorism really needs to be corrected. The minimal invasive endoscopic surgery has been gaining attention since the early '90s, however, it has technical limitations (only strip craniectomy is possible). Attempts have been made to reach beyond these limits.

=== Aesthetic ===
Aesthetic outcome of metopic synostosis surgery is persistently good with reoperation hazards below 20%. In 1981 Anderson advised that craniofacial operations for synostosis should be as extensive as necessary after a study of 107 cases of metopic and coronal synostosis. Surgery does not provide a 100% natural outcome, mostly there will be minor irregularities. Reoperations are usually performed on more severe cases (including syndromic metopic synostosis). The hypotelorism and temporal hollowing are the most difficult to correct: the hypotelorism usually remains under corrected and a second operation is often needed for correction of temporal hollowing.

=== Neurological ===
The highest rate of neurological problems of single suture synostosis are seen in patients with trigonocephaly. Surgery is performed generally before the age of one because of claims of better intellectual outcome. Seemingly surgery does not influence the high incidence of neurodevelopment problems in patients with metopic synostosis. Neurological disorders such as ADHD, ASD, ODD and CD are seen in patients with trigonocephaly. These disorders are usually also associated with decreased IQ. The presence of ADHD, ASD and ODD is higher in cases with an IQ below 85. This is not the case with CD which showed an insignificant increase at an IQ below 85.

== Epidemiology ==
The incidence of metopic synostosis is roughly between 1:700 and 1:15,000 newborns globally (differs per country). Trigonocephaly is seen more in males than females ranging from 2:1 to 6.5:1. Hereditary relations in metopic synostosis have been found of which 5.5% were well defined syndromic. Maternal age and a birth weight of less than 2500g may also play a role in trigonocephaly. These data are based on estimations and do not give factual information.

Only one article gives valuable and reliable information regarding the incidence of metopic synostosis in the Netherlands. The incidence in the Netherlands showed an increase from 0.6 (1997) to 1.9 (2007) for every 10,000 live births.

== History ==
In former times people born with malformed skulls were rejected based upon their appearance. This still persists today in various parts of the world even though the intellectual development is often normal. The Austrian physician Franz Joseph Gall presented the science of phrenology in the early 19th century through his work The Anatomy and Physiology of the Nervous System in General, and of the Brain in Particular.

Hippocrates described trigonocephaly as follows: Men's heads are by no means all like to one another, nor are the sutures of the head of all men constructed in the same form. Thus, whoever has a prominence in the anterior part of the head (by prominence is meant the round protuberant part of the bone which projects beyond the rest of it), in him the sutures of the head take the form of the Greek letter 'tau', τ.

Hermann Welcker coined the term trigonocephaly in 1862. He described a child with a V-shaped skull and a cleft lip.

== Popular culture ==
Via a photo shown on a Facebook page, the mother of a child previously diagnosed with this condition recognised the symptoms and reported them to the family involved, resulting in an immediate diagnosis that medical professionals had overlooked in all earlier consultations.
