= Bifid =

Bifid refers to something that is split or cleft into two parts. It may refer to:

- Bifid, a variation in the P wave, R wave, or T wave in an echocardiogram in which a wave which usually has a single peak instead has two separate peaks
- Bifid cipher, a type of cipher in cryptography
- Bifid penis
- Bifid nose, a split nose that can even look like two noses; a fairly common trait in some dog varieties, especially the pachón navarro and its descendants
- Bifid rib, a congenital abnormality of the human anatomy
