= Acrocraniofacial dysostosis =

- Other names: Kaplan Plauchu Fitch syndrome
- Specialty: Medical genetics
- Usual onset: Conception
- Duration: Lifelong
- Causes: Autosomal recessive inheritance
- Diagnostic method: Radiography
- Prevention: None
- Prognosis: Good
- Frequency: very rare, only 2 cases have been described in medical literature
- Deaths: -

Acrocraniofacial dysostosis, also known as Kaplan Plauchu Fitch syndrome, is a very rare hereditary disorder which is characterized by cranio-facial dysmorphisms, hearing loss, digital clubbing, and osseous anomalies. Only 2 cases have been described in medical literature.

== Description ==
The following is a list of the symptoms of the disorder:

=== Cranio-facial ===
- Acrocephaly
- Hypertelorism
- Ptosis
- Proptosis
- Down-slanting palpebral fissures
- High nasal bridge
- Nostril anteversion
- Short philtrum
- Cleft palate
- Micrognathia
- Ear abnormalities
- Preauricular sinus or cyst

=== Auditory ===
- Hearing loss

=== Osseous ===
- Metatarsus adductus
- First brachymetacarpia
- First brachymetatarsia
- Proximally placed first toes
- Craniosynostosis
- Pectus excavatum
- Partial duplication of the thumb's distal phalanx
- Malleus and incus dysplasia
- Tall lumbar vertebrae associated with increased interpedicular distance

== Discovery ==
This disorder was first discovered in 1988 by Kaplan et al. when they described two sisters born to consanguineous parents with all the symptoms mentioned above. They suggested this disorder to be inherited in an autosomal recessive fashion.
