= MN1 =

MN1, MN 1, or MN-1 may be:

- Minnesota State Highway 1
- Ulaanbaatar, ISO 3166-2 geocode for the capital of Mongolia
- Minnesota's 1st congressional district
- The MN1 gene on human chromosome 22
- MN 1 (biostratigraphic zone), a biostratigraphic zone in the European Neogene
