= Trigonocephaly-bifid nose-acral anomalies syndrome =

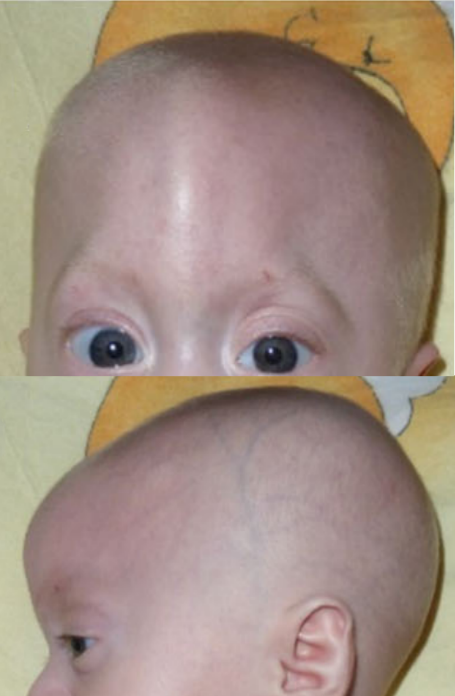
- Specialty: Medical genetics
- Causes: Autosomal recessive inheritance
- Prevention: none
- Prognosis: Good
- Frequency: very rare, only 2 cases have been described in medical literature
- Deaths: -

Trigonocephaly-bifid nose-acral anomalies syndrome is a very rare genetic disorder which is characterized by trigonobrachycephaly, narrow forehead, up-ward slanting palpebral fissures, bulbous, slightly bifid nose, macrostomia, thin upper lip, macrognathia (facial dysmorphisms), broad thumbs, rather large toes, broad fingertips with short nail beds, joint hypermobility and fifth finger clinodactyly (acral). Additional findings include short height, hypotonia and severe psychomotor retardation. It has been described in a brother and a sister born to healthy consanguineous Palestinian Arab parents.
