= Say–Meyer syndrome =

X-linked recessive disorder characterised by developmental delay

- Other names: Trigonocephaly-short stature-developmental delay syndrome
- Specialty: Medical genetics, Pediatrics
- Symptoms: Trigonocephaly, developmental delay, short stature, intellectual disability, craniosynostosis, hypotelorism/hypertelorism
- Usual onset: Congenital
- Causes: Genetic mutation
- Diagnostic method: Clinical evaluation, genetic testing
- Treatment: Supportive care, surgical intervention, physical/speech therapy
- Frequency: Rare

Say–Meyer syndrome is a rare X-linked genetic disorder that is mostly characterized as developmental delay. It is one of the rare causes of short stature. It is closely related to trigonocephaly (a misshapen forehead due to premature fusion of bones in the skull). People with Say–Meyer syndrome have impaired growth, deficits in motor skills development and mental state.

It is suggested that it is from a X-linked transmission.

== Signs and symptoms ==
Common signs of Say–Meyer syndrome are trigonocephaly as well as head and neck symptoms. The head and neck symptoms come in the form of craniosynostosis affecting the metopic suture (the dense connective tissue structure that divides the two halves of the skull in children which usually fuse together by the age of six). Symptoms of Say–Meyer syndrome other than developmental delay and short stature include

- Intellectual disability.
- Low-set ears/posteriorly rotated ears
- Intellectual deficit as well as learning disability
- Intrauterine growth retardation (poor growth of a baby while it is in the mother's womb)
- Posterior fontanel
- Premature synostosis of the lambdoid suture (the fusion of the bones to the joint is premature)
- Narrow forehead
- Trigonocephaly (a frontal bone anomaly that is characterized by a premature fusion of the bones which gives the forehead a triangular shape)
- Hypotelorism or hypertelorism (reduced or increased width between the eyes)
- Craniosynostosis (when one or more seam-like junctions between two bones fuses by turning into bone. This changes the growth pattern of the skull)
- Low birth weight and height

The affected patients sometimes show a highly arched palate, clinodactyly (a defect in which toes or fingers are positioned abnormally) and ventricular septal defect (a heart defect that allows blood to pass directly from left to the right ventricle which is caused by an opening in the septum). Overall, Say–Meyer syndrome impairs growth, motor function, and mental state.

=== Growth and development ===
The growth retardation dates from the intrauterine period (development in the uterus.) The long-term developmental growth and outcome is not known, but the early childhood development is known, which is said to be moderately delayed. Craniosynostosis is usually rare among the X-linked Intellectual Disability Syndromes, but when it is present, it affects the metopic structure (forehead).

== Causes ==
It is a disorder that is mostly characterized as developmental delay and short stature. Magnetic resonance imaging scans usually reveal that there is a decreased volume of white matter in the bilateral cerebral hemispheres, a brain stem that is smaller in size, and a thin corpus callosum (nerve fibers that connect the two hemispheres of the brain). The syndrome is one of the rare causes of short stature.

== Treatment ==
=== Surgical ===
To treat the trigonocephaly, expanding the distance between orbits using springs seems to work. It allows enough space for the brain to grow and it creates a normal horizontal axis of the orbits and supraorbital bar. The endoscopic surgery started to become popular since the early 1990s, but it has some technical limitations (only strip craniectomy is possible). There have been few attempts to go beyond the limits.

Aesthetic outcomes of metopic surgery have been good. Surgery does not have a perfect outcome because there will most likely be minor irregularities. Sometimes reoperations are needed for the severe cases. Trying to hollow out the temporal, and the hypertelorism are very hard to correct. The hypotelorism usually stays not corrected and in order to correct the temporal hollowing, a second operation is most likely needed.

== History ==
The Say–Meyer syndrome was named after Burhan Say and Julia Meyer in 1981 after they observed trigonocephaly in 3 males who were all related. Each male was found to have an X-linked recessive inheritance. The oldest one was found to be intellectually disabled while the other two nephews were found to have

- a closed posterior fontanelle (gap between bones in the human skull).
- a small anterior fontanelle (allows deformation of the skull for the brain to grow).
- a narrow forehead.
- hypotelorism
- marked retardation in weight, height, head circumference, and psychomotor development.

Later on, Say and Meyer have not been able to find any similar case and they classified the disorder as trigonocephaly with minor anomalies. They considered it different from trigonocephaly because trigonocephaly only deals with a deformed head that leads to facial and cranial deformities. Say–Meyer syndrome has both facial and cranial deformities as well as short stature and developmental delay.
