= ALX3 =

Protein-coding gene in the humans

Identifiers
- Aliases: ALX3, FND, FND1, ALX homeobox 3
- External IDs: OMIM: 606014; MGI: 1277097; GeneCards: ALX3

Gene location (Human)
Chr.	Chromosome 1 (human)
Band	1p13.3	Start	110,059,870 bp
Band	1p13.3	End	110,070,672 bp

Gene location (Mouse)
Chr.	Chromosome 3 (mouse)
Band	3 F2.3|3 46.83 cM	Start	107,502,347 bp
Band	3 F2.3|3 46.83 cM	End	107,513,092 bp
RNA expression pattern
Bgee	Human / Mouse (ortholog); Top expressed in: testicle; anterior pituitary; muscle tissue; mucosa of nose; superior frontal gyrus; gonad; left uterine tube; mammary gland; lactiferous gland; lymph node / Top expressed in: abdominal wall; mandibular prominence; primitive streak; medial nasal prominence; female urethra; lateral nasal prominence; genital tubercle; olfactory bulb; embryo; pineal gland; More reference expression data
BioGPS	n/a
Gene ontology
Molecular function	sequence-specific DNA binding; DNA binding; DNA-binding transcription factor activity, RNA polymerase II-specific; RNA polymerase II transcription regulatory region sequence-specific DNA binding
Cellular component	nucleus
Biological process	regulation of apoptotic process; pattern specification process; embryonic skeletal system morphogenesis; multicellular organism development; regulation of transcription, DNA-templated; embryonic forelimb morphogenesis; transcription, DNA-templated; embryonic hindlimb morphogenesis; embryonic cranial skeleton morphogenesis; regulation of transcription by RNA polymerase II
Sources:Amigo / QuickGO
Orthologs
Databases	NCBI: entry; OMA: entry
Species	Human	Mouse
Entrez	257	11694
Ensembl	ENSG00000156150	ENSMUSG00000014603
UniProt	O95076	O70137
RefSeq (mRNA)	NM_006492	NM_007441
RefSeq (protein)	NP_006483	NP_031467
Location (UCSC)	Chr 1: 110.06 – 110.07 Mb	Chr 3: 107.5 – 107.51 Mb
PubMed search
- Wikidata
View/Edit Human	View/Edit Mouse

The ALX3 gene, also known as aristaless-like homeobox 3, is a protein-coding gene that provides instructions to build a protein which is a member of the homeobox protein family. This grouping regulates patterns of anatomical development. The gene encodes a nuclear protein that functions as a transcription regulator involved in cell-type differentiation and development.

The ALX3 protein, encoded by the gene, is a transcription factor, meaning that it binds to DNA and obtains control over the action of other genes. The ALX3 protein specifically controls genes that regulate cell growth, proliferation, and migration. This protein is essential for the development of the head and face, specifically the nose. This event begins around the fourth week of development.

At least 7 mutations in the ALX3 gene are known to cause frontonasal dysplasia. The mutations eliminate the function of the ALX3 protein, resulting in decreased ability to bind to DNA. The loss of regulatory function results in uncontrolled cell proliferation and migration during fetal development. One particular form of the disorder, called frontonasal dysplasia type 1, presents with abnormal development of structures in the middle of the face. The most common malformation of this defect is a cleft in the nose, lip, and palate.

ALX3 was first discovered by a group of scientists, led by Hopi Hoekstra, a biologist from Harvard University, that investigated how stripe patterns form in animals. They investigated the Rhabdomys pumiliom, commonly known as the African striped mouse because of the alternating colored stripes observed on its back. One of the members of the team, Ricardo Mallarino, discovered that the stripes were formed during embryogenesis in the mice. Melanocytes, the specialized cells that produce the pigments in the skin, were not active in areas where the lighter stripes were observed. They then researched the genes active in those areas using RNA sequencing. They discovered that ALX3 was expressed in the light hair areas but not in the dark hair areas. They found that all mice expressed the gene on their abdomen but only the African striped mouse expressed it on its back, hence why the strips appear. Protein-DNA binding was then performed to determine where the ALX3 protein binds on the DNA. ALX3 binds to the promoter and represses MITF, which allows transcription to take place when making melanocytes. More tests were performed to confirm the function of ALX3 within the African striped mice. The gene was observed in other rodents such as the North American chipmunks and deemed responsible for the similar outcomes. The differences in evolution amongst the species did not hinder the similarities in the expression of the gene. This led the team to believe that ALX3 may have the same effect in mammals.
