= GLH =

GLH may refer to:

- Dodge Omni (GLH)
- Gallaher Group, a British tobacco company
- Glasshoughton railway station, in England
- GLH Hotels, a British-based global hotel company
- Gomez and López-Hernández syndrome
- Mid Delta Regional Airport, in Mississippi, United States
- Northwest Pashayi language
