= Turricephaly =

Malformation of the skull in which the head appears tall and thin

- Other names: Oxycephaly, Acrocephaly, Hypsicephaly, Oxycephalia, Steeple head, Tower head, Tower skull, High-head syndrome, Turmschädel
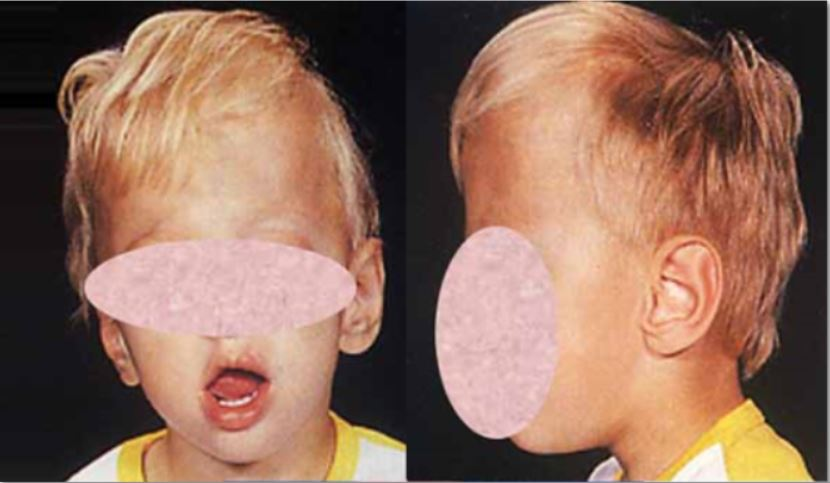
- Specialty: Dysmorphology
- Symptoms: reduced head length and width for age

Turricephaly is a type of cephalic disorder where the head appears tall with a small length and width. It is due to premature closure of the coronal suture plus any other suture, like the lambdoid, or it may be used to describe the premature fusion of all sutures. It should be differentiated from Crouzon syndrome. Oxycephaly (or acrocephaly) is a form of turricephaly where the head is cone-shaped, and is the most severe of the craniosynostoses.

== Presentation ==
=== Common associations ===
It may be associated with:

- 8th cranial nerve lesion
- Optic nerve compression
- Intellectual disability
- Syndactyly

=== Conditions with turricephaly ===
Conditions with turricephaly include:

- Achondrogenesis, type IA
- Acrocephalopolydactyly
- Acrocephalosyndactyly type V (Goodman syndrome)
- Acrocraniofacial dysostosis
- Alopecia - contractures - dwarfism - intellectual disability syndrome
- CEBALID syndrome
- Chromosome 1q21.1 deletion syndrome
- Chromosome 4q32.1-q32.2 triplication syndrome
- Chromosome 5p13 duplication syndrome
- Cole-Carpenter syndrome 2
- Craniorhiny
- Craniosynostosis (nonsyndromic) 6
- Craniosynostosis, Boston-type (nonsyndromic)
- Craniosynostosis and dental anomalies
- Fontaine progeroid syndrome
- Gomez Lopez Hernandez syndrome
- Intellectual developmental disorder, autosomal dominant 65
- MEGF8-related Carpenter syndrome
- Mosaic trisomy 12
- Myopathy, epilepsy, and progressive cerebral atrophy
- Peroxisome biogenesis disorder 2A (Zellweger)
- Potocki-Shaffer syndrome
- Saethre-Chotzen syndrome
- Spondyloenchondrodysplasia with immune dysregulation
- Spondylometaphyseal dysplasia, Sedaghatian type
- Summitt syndrome
- Teebi-Shaltout syndrome
- Tolchin-Le Caignec syndrome
- TWIST1-related craniosynostosis
- Usmani-Riazuddin syndrome, autosomal dominant
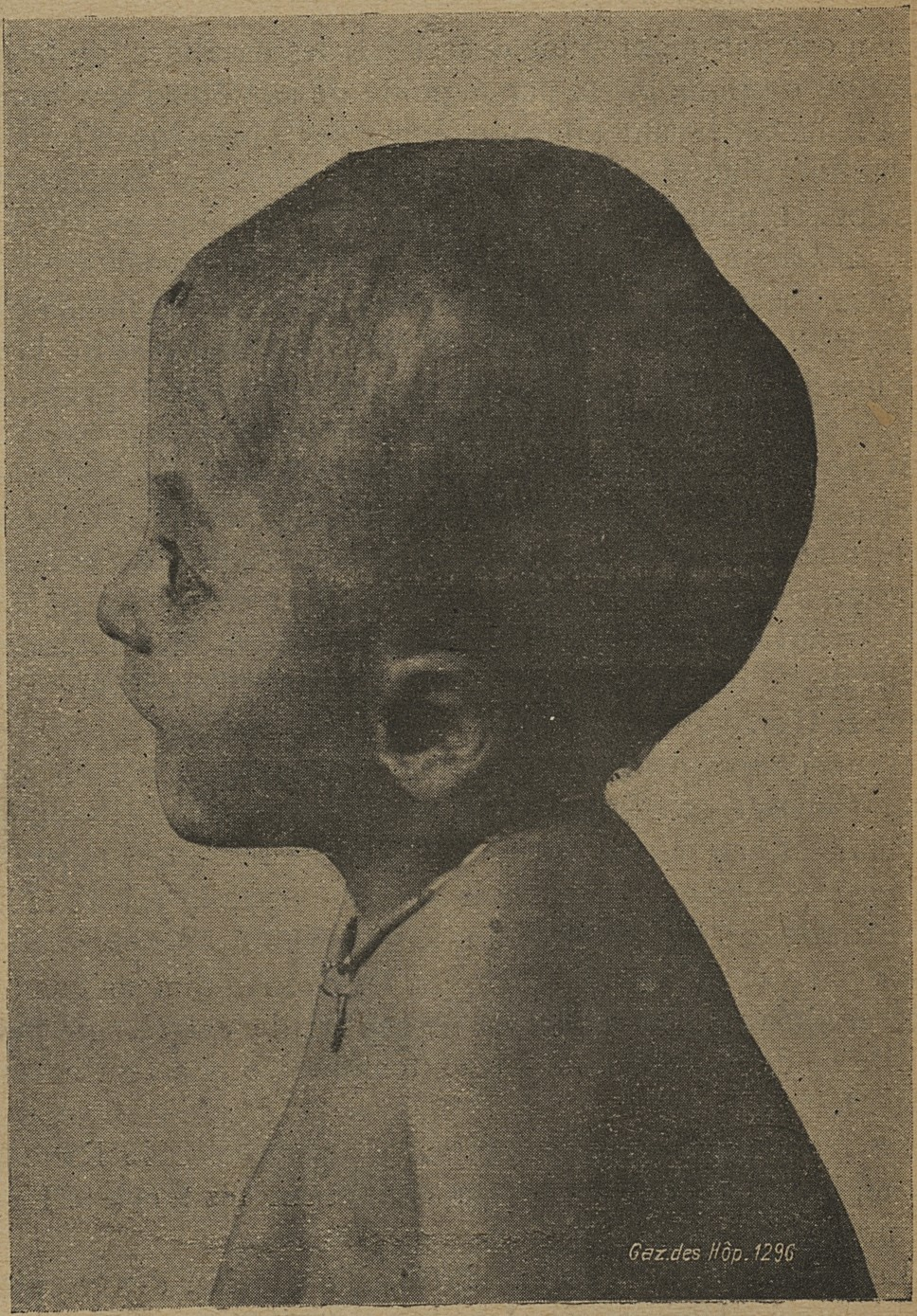
Carpenter syndrome

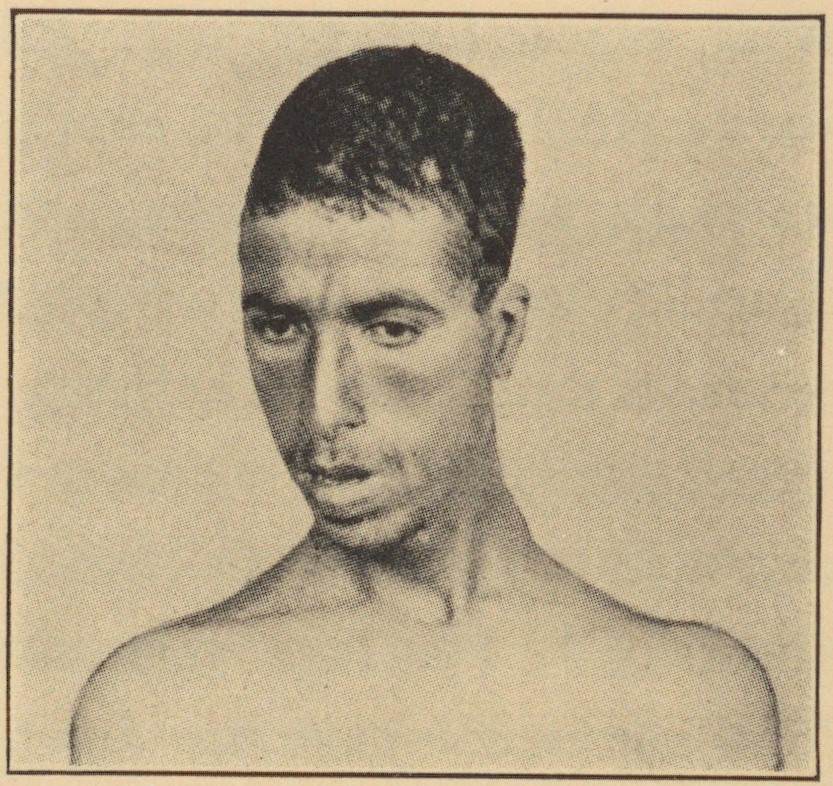
Congenital syphilis

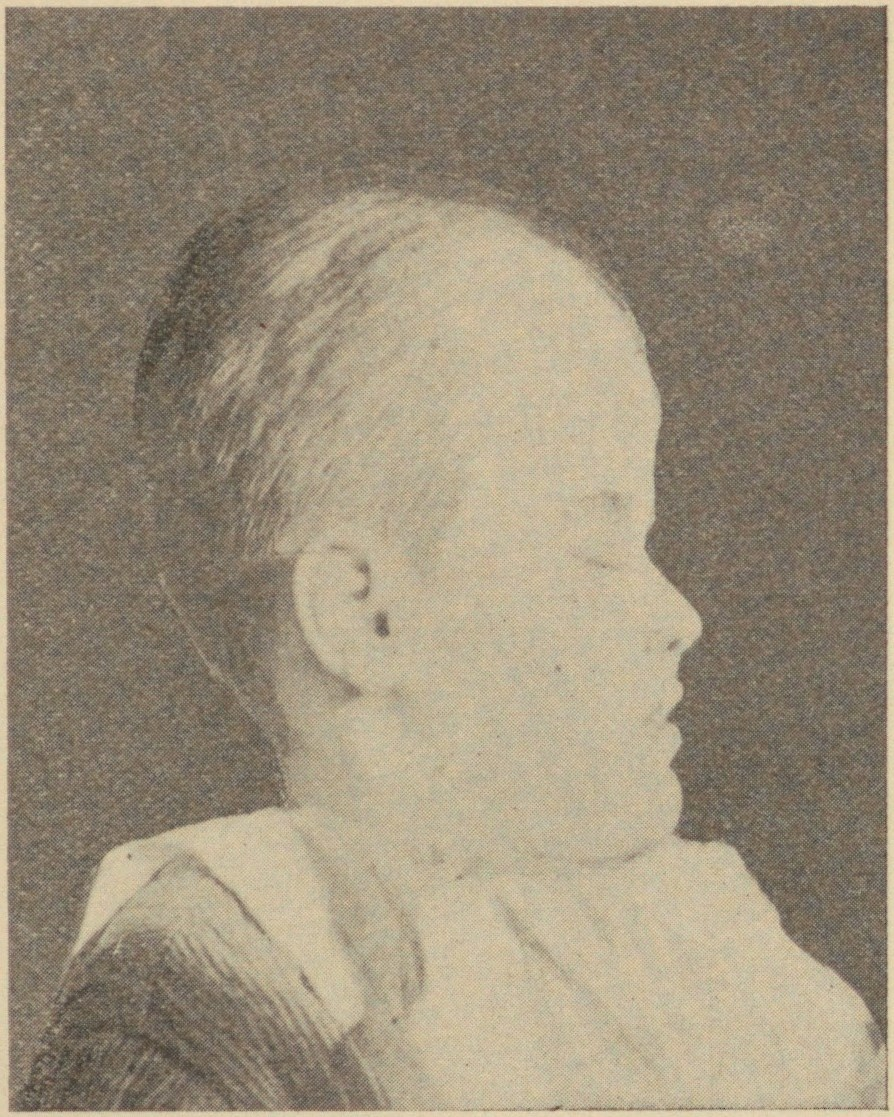
Hydrocephalus

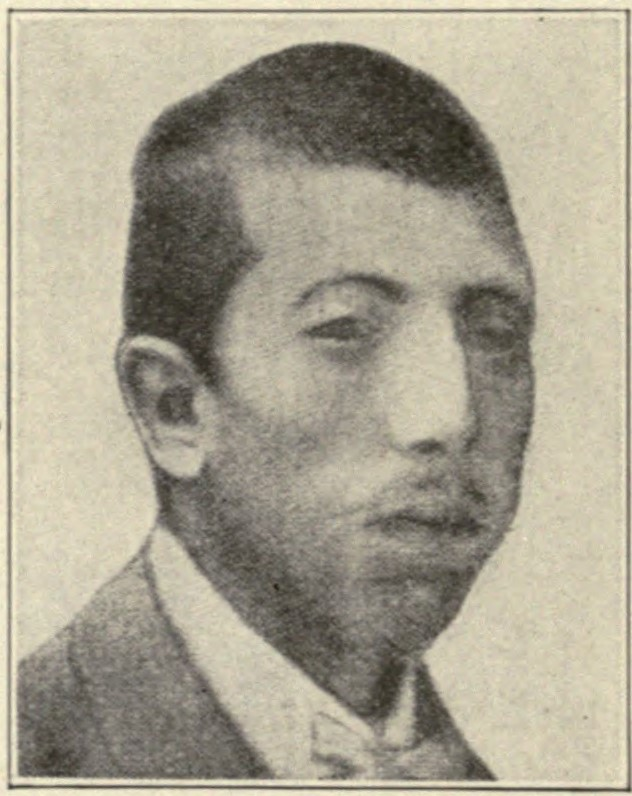
Microcephaly

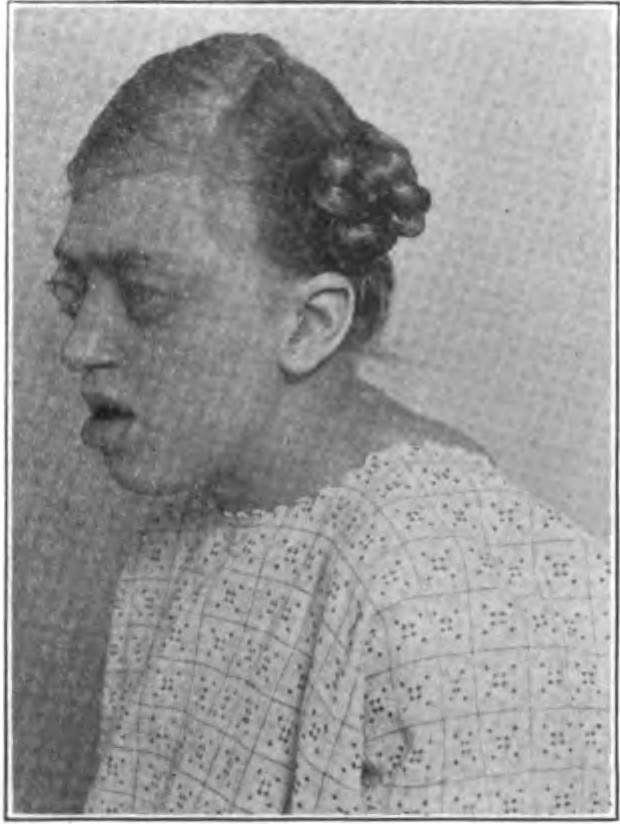
Pfeiffer syndrome

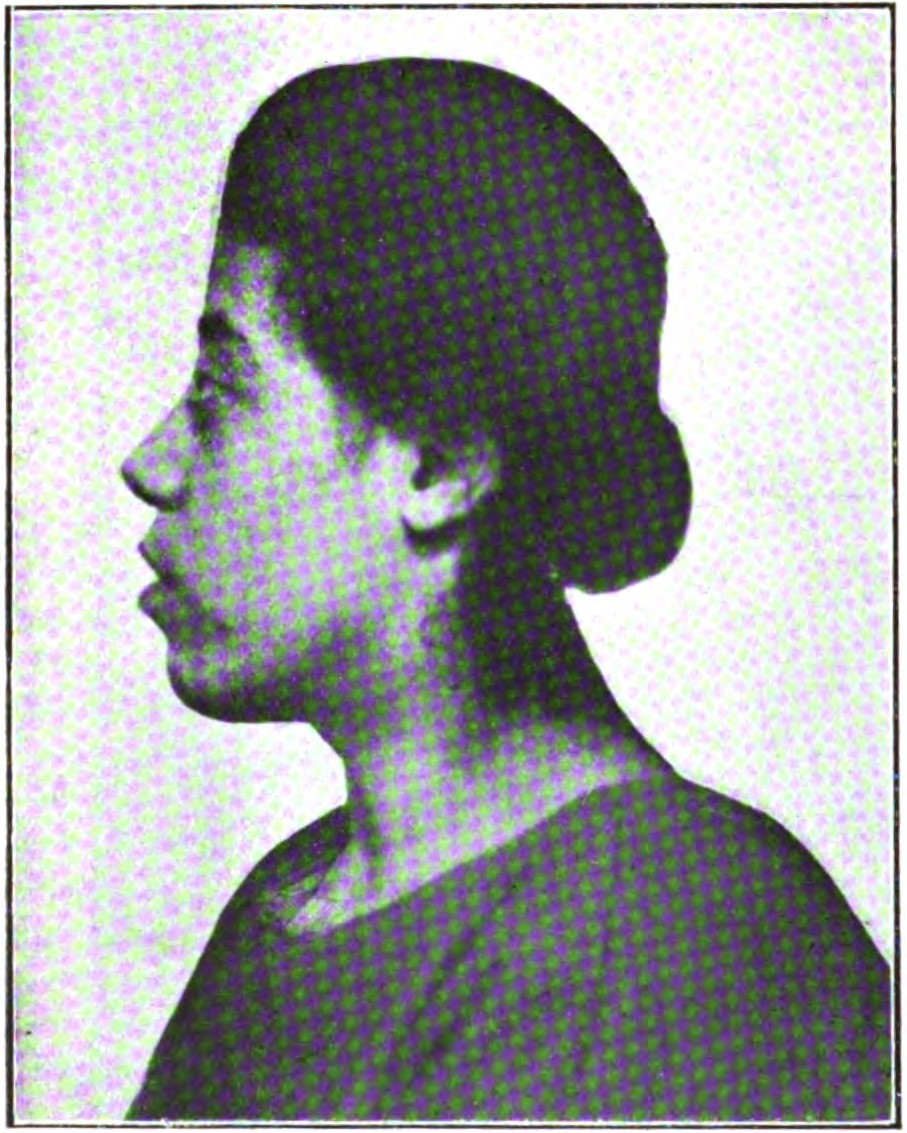
Saethre-Chotzen syndrome

== See also ==
- Acrocephalosyndactylia
