= Rhombencephalosynapsis =

Rare brain abnormality

Rhombencephalosynapsis is a rare genetic brain abnormality of malformation of the cerebellum. The cerebellar vermis is either absent or only partially formed, and fusion is seen in varying degree between the cerebellar hemispheres, fusion of the middle cerebellar peduncles, and fusion of the dentate nuclei. Findings range from mild truncal ataxia, to severe cerebral palsy.

Rhombencephalosynapsis is a constantly found feature of Gomez-Lopez-Hernandez syndrome. One case of which has shown a co-occurrence with autism-spectrum disorder.

== Presentation ==
Clinical indications range from mild truncal ataxia with unaffected cognitive abilities, to severe cerebral palsy and intellectual disability.

== Genetics ==
An association with mutations in the MN1 gene has been reported in cases of atypical rhomboencephalosynapsis.

== Pathology ==
Rhombencephalosynapsis is a rare brain disorder of malformation of the cerebellum that may be detected on ultrasound of the fetus. The vermis is either absent or partially formed. There is dorsal fusion of the cerebellar hemispheres, fusion of the dentate nuclei, and fusion of the middle cerebellar peduncles. The degree of severity of this disorder is associated with the degree of maldevelopment of the cerebellar vermis.

Aqueductal stenosis commonly exists with the disorder, as does its often resulting hydrocephalus. In some cases additional abnormalities may be present, such as ventriculomegaly (enlarged ventricles), and supratentorial abnormalities.

== Diagnosis ==
Rhombencephalosynapsis can be detected on imaging of the fetus. It is one of the triad of features characteristic of Gomez-Lopez-Hernandez syndrome (GLHS). When detected, signs of GLHS ought to be looked for on post-natal review. Signs include partial alopecia and some facial peculiarities. It is thought that due to the co-occurrence of these two disorders they may have a common etiology.

As a feature of GLHS one case study has shown GLHS to co-occur with autism spectrum disorder.

== Epidemiology ==
As of 2018 only 36 cases of GLHS have been reported.

== History ==
The first case was reported by Heinrich Obersteiner in 1914.
