= Ephrin B1 =

Protein found in humans

EFNB1

Identifiers
- Aliases: EFNB1, CFND, CFNS, EFB1, EFL3, EPLG2, Elk-L, LERK2, ephrin B1
- External IDs: OMIM: 300035; MGI: 102708; GeneCards: EFNB1

Gene location (Human)
Chr.	X chromosome (human)
Band	Xq13.1	Start	68,829,021 bp
Band	Xq13.1	End	68,842,160 bp

Gene location (Mouse)
Chr.	X chromosome (mouse)
Band	X C3|X 43.22 cM	Start	98,179,736 bp
Band	X C3|X 43.22 cM	End	98,192,597 bp
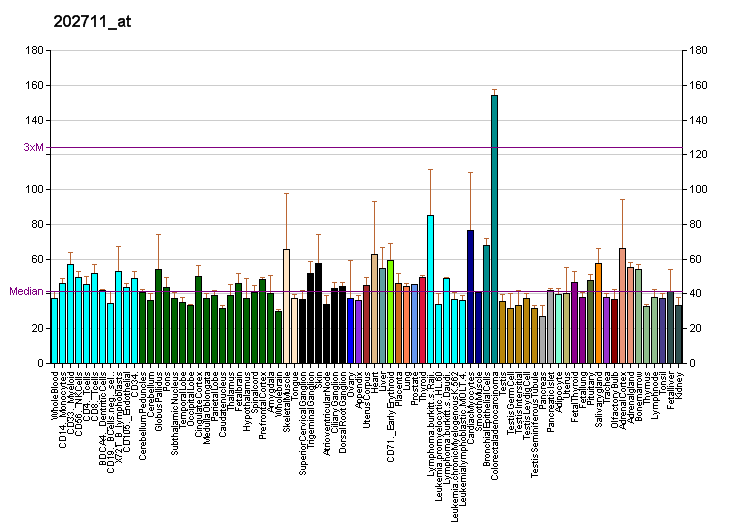
RNA expression pattern
Bgee	Human / Mouse (ortholog); Top expressed in: ventricular zone; right lung; ganglionic eminence; mucosa of transverse colon; skin of abdomen; skin of leg; upper lobe of left lung; tibial nerve; apex of heart; ectocervix / Top expressed in: ventricular zone; Ileal epithelium; external carotid artery; lumbar spinal ganglion; internal carotid artery; Rostral migratory stream; renal corpuscle; lip; yolk sac; gastrula; More reference expression data
BioGPS	More reference expression data
Gene ontology
Molecular function	protein binding; ephrin receptor binding; protein tyrosine kinase activity
Cellular component	integral component of membrane; nucleus; extracellular exosome; membrane; membrane raft; integral component of plasma membrane; synapse; cytoplasm; plasma membrane
Biological process	positive regulation of T cell proliferation; nervous system development; cell-cell signaling; T cell costimulation; multicellular organism development; neural crest cell migration; cell differentiation; cell adhesion; embryonic pattern specification; axon guidance; ephrin receptor signaling pathway; peptidyl-tyrosine phosphorylation
Sources:Amigo / QuickGO
Orthologs
Databases	NCBI: entry; OMA: entry
Species	Human	Mouse
Entrez	1947	13641
Ensembl	ENSG00000090776	ENSMUSG00000031217
UniProt	P98172	P52795
RefSeq (mRNA)	NM_004429	NM_010110
RefSeq (protein)	NP_004420	NP_034240
Location (UCSC)	Chr X: 68.83 – 68.84 Mb	Chr X: 98.18 – 98.19 Mb
PubMed search
- Wikidata
View/Edit Human	View/Edit Mouse

Ephrin B1 is a protein that in humans is encoded by the EFNB1 gene. It is a member of the ephrin family. The encoded protein is a type I membrane protein and a ligand of Eph-related receptor tyrosine kinases. It may play a role in cell adhesion and function in the development or maintenance of the nervous system.

== Clinical significance ==
Mutations in this protein are responsible for most cases of craniofrontonasal syndrome.

== Interactions ==
EFNB1 has been shown to interact with SDCBP.
