= Craniorhiny =

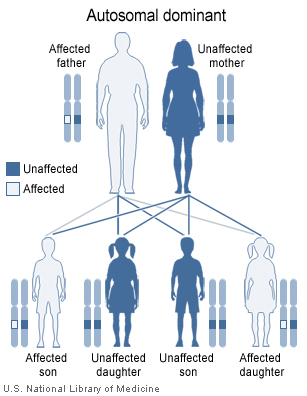
- Autosomal dominant inheritance

Craniorhiny is a rare autosomal dominant syndrome characterized by craniosynostosis (oxycephaly) and facial anomalies around the nose base and lips.

== Signs and symptoms ==
Features of this condition include:

- Head or neck: anteverted nares, wide nose, recessed forehead
- Integument: nasal hirsutism
- Musculoskeletal system: craniosynotosis, oxycephaly/turricephaly

Infranasal spherical cyst-like formations with fistulas have also been seen.

== History ==
The first (and only confirmed) reports of this condition was made in 1991, seen in a father and son. Two siblings reported in 2007 are also speculated to have the condition.
