= Jacobsen syndrome =

- Other names: Del(11)(qter), distal deletion 11q, distal monosomy 11q, monosomy 11qter
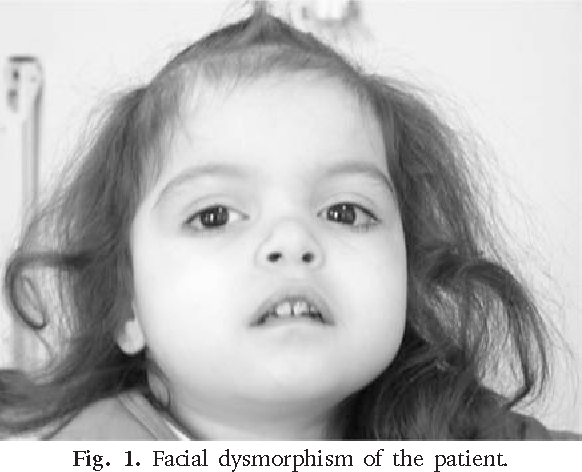
- A girl displaying characteristic facial features of Jacobsen syndrome
- Specialty: Medical genetics

Jacobsen syndrome is a rare chromosomal disorder resulting from deletion of genes from chromosome 11 that includes band 11q24.1. It is a congenital disorder. Since the deletion takes place on the q arm of chromosome 11, it is also called 11q terminal deletion disorder. The deletion may range from 5 million to 16 million deleted DNA base pairs. The severity of symptoms depends on the number of deletions; the more deletions there are, the more severe the symptoms are likely to be.

People with Jacobsen syndrome have serious intellectual disabilities, dysmorphic features, delayed development and a variety of physical problems including heart defects. Research shows that almost 88.5% of people with Jacobsen syndrome have a bleeding disorder called Paris-Trousseau syndrome.

Jacobsen syndrome is catastrophic in 1 out of every 5 cases, with children usually dying within the first 2 years of life due to heart complications.

== Signs and symptoms ==
Almost all children with Jacobsen syndrome have intellectual disabilities, which range from mild to moderate depending upon the number of the deletions of genes from the chromosome. Most have delayed development, including delayed speech, motor disabilities and lack of coordination, which makes simple activities like sitting, standing and walking difficult. Most children eventually start speaking, but in cases with severe intellectual disability language use is highly restricted.

They have distinctive facial features like:

- Small head (microcephaly)
- Pointed forehead (trigonocephaly)
- Small ears which are low-set
- Widely-spaced eyes (hypertelorism)
- Droopy eyelids (ptosis)
- Broad nasal bridge
- Abnormally thin upper lips
- Downturned corners of the mouth
- Excess skin covering in the inner corner of eyes (epicanthal folds)

Some children also experience behavioural problems like distractibility, hyperactivity, impaired communication and social skills, which qualifies them for a diagnosis of ASD and ADHD. Heart defects are very common in children with Jacobsen syndrome. 88.5% of people with the disorder have Paris-Trousseau syndrome, which is a bleeding disorder and causes a lifelong risk of abnormal bleeding and bruising due to dysfunction in the platelets. Other symptoms may include eye problems, ear and sinus infections, hearing problems, bone deformities, growth hormone deficiency, gastrointestinal problems, kidney malfunctions, etc.

== Cause ==
Jacobsen syndrome is caused by deletion of genetic material from the long arm of chromosome 11. The size of deletion may vary across patients, but the deletion always occurs at the end terminal of the q arm of chromosome 11. There are three ways in which the deletion could occur:

de novo deletion- this is a random event that occurred during the formation of the sperm or the egg or during the cell division in the embryonic stage, where genes from chromosome 11 get deleted.

Imbalanced translocation- in this case, a parent with balanced translocation or other types of chromosomal rearrangement can pass on these genes to their children which further results in an imbalanced translocation. The affected children have deletions on chromosome 11 as well as some extra genetic material from another chromosome.

Ring chromosome 11- in this case genetic material from both long and short arm of the chromosome get deleted, and the remaining part joins and forms a ring like structure. Here the affected person would have symptoms associated with both 11q and 11p deletion.

== Genetics ==
If de novo deletion occurs then both the parents have normal chromosomes, and chances that another child will have the deletion decline. Very few cases have been found in which the deletion has been present in mosaic form (where some of the cells have deletion on chromosome 11 and some do not, and the symptoms are less severe) in one of the parents, which increases the risk of having another child with Jacobsen syndrome. When the child's chromosomal abnormality occurs due to one of the parents' balanced translocation, the chances of another child having the abnormality is high.

== Treatment ==
There has been no treatment discovered for Jacobsen syndrome to date, but the symptoms can be treated. 56% of children with Jacobsen syndrome have congenital heart problems; to keep them in check, a baseline evaluation can be made by a paediatric cardiologist by carrying out an electrocardiogram or echocardiogram. Any problems that are found can be treated then.

Monthly CBT may help ease bleeding disorders. Consecutively, platelet transfusion and ddAVP can be carried out. Medication that interferes with platelet count should be avoided, and oral contraceptive therapy may be considered for women with heavy bleeding during menses.

An evaluation by a neuropsychologist or a behaviour specialist like a psychiatrist or psychologist can be performed, including brain imaging like MRI or ERP. Later, as deemed appropriate, intervention programs can be carried through. Music therapy is very beneficial for language development. According to the age, vision and hearing tests can aid in fixing problems related cognition. For problems related to behaviour like ADHD, medication or therapy would be required but a combination of both is more effective. An ophthalmologist should be consulted to treat the eye defects. Play and interactive games encourage the child to speak. Habilitiation in children should begin at an early age. A habilitation team includes professionals with special expertise in how disability affects everyday life, health and development. The entire family is supported to help the affected children and their families adjust better.

== Prevalence ==
The estimated prevalence of Jacobsen syndrome is believed to be approximately 1 out of every 100,000 births. For reasons unknown, females are twice as likely to have Jacobsen syndrome than males. No preference for any race or ethnicity has been reported so far.

== History ==
The syndrome was first identified by Danish geneticist Petrea Jacobsen in 1973 and was named after her. She discovered it in a family where multiple people had the disorder, and found that the affected children had unbalanced translocation between chromosome 11 and 21 which they had inherited from one of their parents who had balanced translocation. Since then, only 200 cases have been reported of Jacobsen syndrome in medical literature.
