= Dural tear =

- Specialty: Neurology

Dural tear is a tear occurring in the dura mater of the brain. It is usually caused as a result of trauma or as a complication following surgery.

== Diagnosis ==
In case of head injury, a dural tear is likely in case of a depressed skull fracture. A burr hole is made through the normal skull near the fractured portion, and Adson's elevator is introduced. Underlying dura is separated carefully from the overlying depressed bone fragments. The dura that is now visible is carefully examined to exclude any dural tear.

== Treatment ==
The whole extent of the dural tear is exposed by removing the overlying skull. The ragged edges of the tear are excised. However, care should be taken not to excise too much dura as it may increase the chances for spread of infection into the subarachnoid space. Removing too much dura will also make it difficult to close the tear. If there is not much dural loss, interrupted sutures are made with non-absorbable material. In case of dural loss, the defect is closed using a transplant from fascia lata or pericranium given that there is not much contamination of the dura. In case of contamination, the defect is left alone and a primary suture is performed at a later date.

If dural tear is associated with haemorrhage from dural vessels, they are coagulated using diathermy. This technique is preferred because the vessels are too small to be picked up by an artery forceps. Large vessels, if present, can be under-run with suture. When the dural tear is associated with a dural sinus hemorrhage, a graft of pericranium is used for a small tear and a muscle graft from temporalis is used for a large tear. The muscle graft is flattened by hammering before using it for grafting.

If dural tear is associated with a brain injury, wide exposure of the wound is done to examine the extent of brain damage. All devitalized brain tissues are removed along with extravasated blood, foreign bodies and pieces of bone. All devitalized tissue and foreign bodies are removed by a combination of irrigation and suction.

Following dural repair, skull deficit is treated by using moulded tantalum plates or acrylic inlays, three to six months after the head injury.
