= Bifid nose =

- Other names: Bifid nose tip, cleft nose, cleft nose tip, median fissure of nose, median cleft of nose
- Specialty: Medical genetics, plastic surgery
- Symptoms: Having a cleft between the two nostrils of the nose
- Complications: Usually, there aren't any.
- Usual onset: Conception
- Duration: Life-long (unless cosmetic surgery is done)
- Causes: Genetics
- Risk factors: Having parents or close relatives with the anomaly.
- Diagnostic method: Physical evaluation
- Prevention: None
- Treatment: Usually, none is necessary
- Prognosis: Good
- Frequency: Uncommon
- Deaths: None

A bifid nose (also known as cleft nose) is an uncommon congenital anomaly which is characterized by the presence of a cleft between the two nostrils of the nose. It is the result of a disturbance during embryological nose development.

It is part of the Tessier classification for craniofacial clefts.

== Signs and symptoms ==
The visibility of this malformation varies from person to person; from a barely noticeable "line" in the middle of the nose to the complete clefting of the nose which results in two "half noses", the airway is usually adequate. Individuals with this birth anomaly don't have any symptoms related to their bifid nose.

== Complications ==
This anomaly is merely cosmetic, and the severity of it doesn't affect a person with the anomaly (health-wise) since usually there is a normal and adequate nasal airway.

== Diagnosis ==
This anomaly can be diagnosed by physical examination if diagnosis is necessary in order to treat a complication.

This difference can serve as a diagnostic method since it occurs alongside other anomalies, such as frontonasal dysplasia, hypertelorbitism and cleft lips.

Bifid noses can also be diagnosed prenatally via a coronal view of the face under ultrasonography, they typically have a broad appearance with "a cleavage between the nostrils resembling a double barrel gun".

== Causes ==
This condition is caused due to incomplete fusion of both sides of the nose during embryonic life.

This anomaly is highly hereditary: autosomal dominant and autosomal recessive inheritance patterns have been observed in multiple families.

If the bifid nose is accompanied by abnormalities of the anorectal and renal systems, it may be part of a different separate genetic disorder (which is characterized by overlapping toes, renal adysplasia and variable anorectal anomalies) that is caused by autosomal recessive mutations in the FREM1 gene.

== Treatment ==
Generally, sutures and rhinoplasty can be done in order to get rid of a bifid nose tip (though what surgery should be done depends on the severity of the cleft nose). Open W-shaped surgical incisions have also proven to be effective. Surgery is usually done before the age of 5.

== Prevalence ==
This birth anomaly affects less than 0.0008% of people worldwide, making it the most common midline craniofacial cleft.

8% of people with bifid nose also have hypertelorism.

== Bifid nose as a hereditary trait ==
Two forms of inheritance pattern for bifid noses have been described: autosomal recessive and autosomal dominant.

One case per inheritance pattern follows:

- Autosomal dominant: Anyane-Yeboa et al. (1984) describes 5 women from a 3-generation American family. Karyotypes and skull X-rays done on the younger sisters gave normal results.
- Autosomal recessive: Boo-Chai et al. (1965) describes 3 siblings from a continental Indian family.

== History ==
This condition was first described in medical literature in 1939 by Esser et al. when they described 5 children (4 siblings and a male first-cousin of theirs) from a single family.

== Occurrence in animals ==
This condition can also occur in animals, such as dogs.

== See also ==
- Cleft palate
- Cleft lip
- Cleft chin
