= Paris-Trousseau syndrome =

- Other names: Paris-Trousseau thrombocytopenia

Paris-Trousseau syndrome (PTS) is an inherited disorder characterized by mild hemorrhagic tendency associated with 11q chromosome deletion. It manifests as a granular defect within an individual's platelets. It is characterized by thrombocytes with defects in α-granule components which affects the cell's surface area and, consequently, its ability to spread when necessary.

FLI1 has been suggested as a candidate.

There is no curative treatment. Management is based on supportive measures to prevent and control bleeding: avoiding drugs that affect platelet function, such as aspirin or NSAIDs, antifibrinolytics (tranexamic acid) for mild bleeding, and platelet transfusion in severe bleeding or before surgery.

== See also ==
- Jacobsen syndrome
