= Gómez–López-Hernández syndrome =

Gómez-López-Hernández syndrome
- Other names: Craniosynostosis-alopecia-brain defect syndrome, Craniosynostosis-alopecia-brain defect syndrome
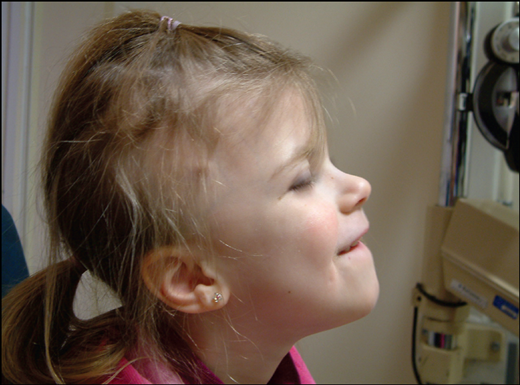
- A young girl showing characteristic bilateral alopecia and angled ears

Gómez–López-Hernández syndrome (GLH) or cerebellotrigeminal-dermal dysplasia is a rare neurocutaneous (Phakomatosis) disorder affecting the trigeminal nerve and causing several other neural and physical abnormalities. Gómez–López-Hernández syndrome has been diagnosed in only 34 people. Cases of Gómez–López-Hernández syndrome may be under-reported as other diseases share the characteristics of cerebellar malformation shown in Gómez–López-Hernández syndrome. Gómez–López-Hernández syndrome was first characterized in 1979.

== Presentation ==
=== Physical ===
Physical characteristics of the syndrome can vary and are not universal. People with Gómez–López-Hernández syndrome often have a short skull (brachycephaly), thin lips, low-set and posterior-angled ears, and scalp alopecia above both ears. This bilateral scalp alopecia is the most consistent physical characteristic of Gómez–López-Hernández syndrome. In addition to the shortness of the skull, it is also misshapen and often flattened on the back. Some people with Gómez–López-Hernández syndrome also have wide-set (hypertelorism) and crossed eyes (strabismus). Scarring or clouding of the cornea occurs in the majority of people with Gómez–López-Hernández syndrome. A short stature is common.

=== Neurological ===
Aside from the physical characteristics of the eyes there is also less sensation in the eyes when stimulated. The eyes also show low motor control (ataxia). Along with ataxia comes a lack of coordination or ability to judge the distance of objects (dysmetria). MRIs show a constant feature of rhombencephalosynapsis–a condition marked by the absence or partial absence of the cerebellar vermis and varying degrees of fusion in the cerebellum in every case of Gómez–López-Hernández syndrome. Also absent are the trigeminal nerve of the trigeminal cave and the foramen rotundum, causing abnormal sensations on the forehead and the corneas. One Gómez–López-Hernández syndrome case in Japan also presents fever-induced seizures. Others may or may not present with non-fever-induced seizures. Malformations of motor centers in the brain cause reduced muscle strength (hypotonia). Eleven of fifteen people in one study showed moderate-to-severe intellectual disability. In cases where it has been noted, head nodding is present. Hydrocephalus and enlargement of the ventricular system is consistently present. A reduced corpus callosum is present in some cases (agenesis of the corpus callosum).

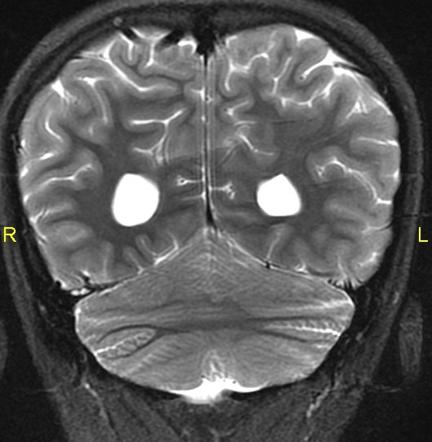
MRI showing fusion of cerebellar hemispheres common in GLH syndrome

=== Behavioral ===
Gómez–López-Hernández syndrome is associated with irritability, anxiety, insomnia, and self-harming behavior. Developmental disabilities often present as intellectual disability with social, occupational, and learning disabilities. Reduced eye sensation may cause self-harm to the eyes; one patient is on record as having put her fingers into her eyes to the point of causing additional corneal damage beyond what is normally characteristic of the syndrome.

== Causes ==
The exact causes of Gómez–López-Hernández syndrome are currently unknown. Mutations of the ACP2 gene have been implicated but not confirmed. One case of siblings — both with Gómez–López-Hernández syndrome — has been observed, showing possible evidence of recessive inheritance. The Brazilian parents of these siblings showed some degree of inbreeding, being first cousins. Five of the 34 people diagnosed with Gómez–López-Hernández syndrome have also come from Brazil. Lack of expression from the WNT1, FGF8, FGF17, OTX2, fgf8, and fgf17 genes have all been implicated as possibly being the cause of cerebellum fusion.

== Diagnosis ==
All cases of Gómez–López-Hernández syndrome present scalp alopecia, varying degrees of low-set ears and most have a flattened skull. Scalp alopecia has been present in all but one case though it can be asymmetrical or, in a single case, only present on one side. All people with Gómez–López-Hernández syndrome also have delayed motor milestones. All people with the syndrome have malformation of the cerebellum. Certain characteristics are often present in those with Gómez–López-Hernández syndrome but are not consistent enough to rule out the syndrome if they are not present. Reduced eye sensation, or trigeminal anesthesia, is present in about three-quarters of people with Gómez–López-Hernández syndrome. Malformations of the skull, rotations of the ears, and abnormalities of the face are features that vary widely and cannot be used alone to diagnose Gómez–López-Hernández syndrome as these characteristics overlap with some other diseases. Gómez–López-Hernández syndrome has been diagnosed as early as 21 weeks with prenatal MRI showing fusion of the cerebellum and later confirmed postnatal with skull and facial abnormalities at six weeks.

== Management ==
Gómez–López-Hernández syndrome is rare and similar to other developmental disabilities. Management is similar to other developmental disabilities as there is no cure for malformations of the brain. Gómez–López-Hernández syndrome has been diagnosed mostly in poorer countries. There have been no documented attempts made to educate children with the syndrome (when intellectual disability is present) to establish a baseline of intellectual ability due to these socioeconomic problems.

== Prognosis ==
The oldest person who has been diagnosed with Gómez–López-Hernández syndrome was 29 years old at the time of his assessment in 2008. Most people with Gómez–López-Hernández syndrome are consistently low weight (3rd-25th percentile) and low stature due to a deficiency of growth hormone. Low mobility is often an issue. The cause of low mobility is thought to be neurological, therefore bone structure is not greatly affected. Seizures may or may not be present and can result in injuries for those who are more mobile. ADHD and bipolar disorder — which are sometimes present — can lead to dangerous behavior or outbursts. While most people with Gómez–López-Hernández syndrome show moderate intellectual disability, one case (age 14) has resulted in normal learning and social skills without intervention.

== Epidemiology ==
Most cases have been diagnosed in Latin America with five of the thirty-four being from Brazil. Two of these Brazilians are related by blood (consanguinity) suggesting the possibility of Mendelian inheritance. There has been one case of a Japanese patient with Gómez–López-Hernández syndrome so far. Two Armenian cases and two from Europe have been identified, signaling that the perceived prevalence in Latin America may be short-lived as better diagnostic techniques and information about this syndrome become more widespread. Recently, a case of Gómez–López-Hernández syndrome was reported from India as well.

== Eponym ==
Gómez–López-Hernández syndrome is named for Manuel Rodríguez Gómez and Alejandro López-Hernández.
