= MN1 (gene) =

Protein-coding gene in the species Homo sapiens

Identifiers
- Aliases: MN1, MGCR, MGCR1, MGCR1-PEN, dJ353E16.2, meningioma (disrupted in balanced translocation) 1, MN1 proto-oncogene, transcriptional regulator, CEBALID
- External IDs: OMIM: 156100; MGI: 1261813; GeneCards: MN1

Gene location (Human)
Chr.	Chromosome 22 (human)
Band	22q12.1	Start	27,748,277 bp
Band	22q12.1	End	27,801,756 bp

Gene location (Mouse)
Chr.	Chromosome 5 (mouse)
Band	5 F|5 53.86 cM	Start	111,565,228 bp
Band	5 F|5 53.86 cM	End	111,604,899 bp
RNA expression pattern
Bgee	Human / Mouse (ortholog); Top expressed in: ganglionic eminence; vastus lateralis muscle; Skeletal muscle tissue of biceps brachii; triceps brachii muscle; Skeletal muscle tissue of rectus abdominis; muscle of thigh; ventricular zone; deltoid muscle; body of tongue; gastrocnemius muscle / Top expressed in: ganglionic eminence; medial ganglionic eminence; ankle; extraocular muscle; digastric muscle; otic vesicle; otolith organ; utricle; external carotid artery; dorsal striatum; More reference expression data
BioGPS	n/a
Gene ontology
Molecular function	molecular function
Cellular component	cellular component
Biological process	multicellular organism development; intramembranous ossification; regulation of transcription, DNA-templated; transcription, DNA-templated; biological process
Sources:Amigo / QuickGO
Orthologs
Databases	NCBI: entry; OMA: entry
Species	Human	Mouse
Entrez	4330	433938
Ensembl	ENSG00000169184	ENSMUSG00000070576
UniProt	Q10571	D3YWE6
RefSeq (mRNA)	NM_002430	NM_001081235
RefSeq (protein)	NP_002421	NP_001074704
Location (UCSC)	Chr 22: 27.75 – 27.8 Mb	Chr 5: 111.57 – 111.6 Mb
PubMed search
- Wikidata
View/Edit Human	View/Edit Mouse

MN1 is a gene found on human chromosome 22, with gene map locus 22q12.3-qter. Its official full name is meningioma (disrupted in balanced translocation) 1 because it is disrupted by a balanced translocation (4;22) in a meningioma.

== Function ==
MN1 is a transcription coregulator that enhances or represses gene expression through direct or indirect interaction with the gene regulatory machinery. Reported interactions include the BAF (SWI/SNF) complex. RAC3 and p300. MN1 can act as a coactivator of several transcription factors, including RAR/RXR and the vitamin D receptor. In AML, MN1 binds to genomic sites enriched for binding motifs of ETS factors as well as hematopoietic transcription factors such as RUNX1, GATA2, HOXA cluster genes, and MEIS1. MN1 induces a hematopoietic stem and progenitor gene expression program centered on HOXA cluster genes, particularly HOXA9 and MEIS1 via its interaction with the BAF complex

== Clinical significance ==
The translocation of MN1 was first reported in meningioma. A substantial percentage of primitive neuro-ectodermal tumors (PNET) have MN1 translocations Several different partners were described, although in many cases no fusion partner was identified. MN1 transloations also occur in up to 2% of acute myeloid leukemia (AML) Described fusion partners include ETV6, STAT3 and FLI1. About 50% of fusions are out of frame and result in high expression of MN1 via enhancer hijacking. High MN1 expression in AML and MDS is associated with poor outcome

Mutations in this gene have been associated with cleft palate and an atypical form of rhombencephalosynapsis.
