= Hypotelorism =

Abnormally decreased distance between two body parts, usually the eyes

- Other names: Ocular hypotelorism, orbital hypotelorism, hypotelorbitism
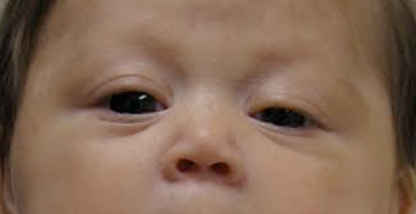
- Hypotelorism as a result of 18p- syndrome

Hypotelorism is an abnormally decreased distance between two organs or bodily parts, usually pertaining to the eye sockets (orbits), also known as orbital hypotelorism.

== Causes ==
It is often a result of fetal alcohol syndrome (FAS), caused by large alcohol intake in the first month of pregnancy.

It can be associated with trisomy 13, which is also known as Patau syndrome, as well as hereditary neuralgic amyotrophy.

It can also be associated with Holoprosencephaly, fragile X syndrome and Prader–Willi syndrome.

Metopic synostosis, the early closure of metopic suture during skull development in children, can also cause hypotelorism.

== See also ==
- Hypertelorism
