= NOBOX =

Protein-coding gene in the species Homo sapiens

Identifiers
- Aliases: NOBOX, OG-2, OG2, OG2X, POF5, TCAG_12042, NOBOX oogenesis homeobox
- External IDs: OMIM: 610934; MGI: 108011; GeneCards: NOBOX

Gene location (Human)
Chr.	Chromosome 7 (human)
Band	7q35	Start	144,397,240 bp
Band	7q35	End	144,410,227 bp

Gene location (Mouse)
Chr.	Chromosome 6 (mouse)
Band	6 B2.1|6 21.17 cM	Start	43,280,608 bp
Band	6 B2.1|6 21.17 cM	End	43,286,488 bp
RNA expression pattern
Bgee	Human / Mouse (ortholog); Top expressed in: gonad; right testis; left testis; right ovary; left ovary / Top expressed in: primary oocyte; zygote; secondary oocyte; embryo; ovary; morula; morula; lens; blastocyst; epithelium of lens; More reference expression data
BioGPS	n/a
Gene ontology
Molecular function	DNA binding; sequence-specific DNA binding; DNA-binding transcription factor activity, RNA polymerase II-specific
Cellular component	nucleus
Biological process	multicellular organism development; cell differentiation; regulation of transcription, DNA-templated; transcription, DNA-templated; oogenesis; regulation of transcription by RNA polymerase II
Sources:Amigo / QuickGO
Orthologs
Databases	NCBI: entry; OMA: entry
Species	Human	Mouse
Entrez	135935	18291
Ensembl	ENSG00000106410; ENSG00000285328	ENSMUSG00000029736
UniProt	O60393	Q8VIH1
RefSeq (mRNA)	NM_001080413	NM_130869
RefSeq (protein)	NP_001073882	NP_570939
Location (UCSC)	Chr 7: 144.4 – 144.41 Mb	Chr 6: 43.28 – 43.29 Mb
PubMed search
- Wikidata
View/Edit Human	View/Edit Mouse

Homeobox protein NOBOX, also known as newborn ovary homeobox protein, is a protein that in humans is encoded by the NOBOX gene. The official symbol (NOBOX) and the official full name (NOBOX oogenesis homeobox) are maintained by the HGNC. The NOBOX gene is conserved in chimpanzee, Rhesus monkey, cow, mouse, and rat. There are 175 organisms that have orthologs with human gene NOBOX. It is capable of regulating other genes that are important in the development of follicles. Follicles do not develop and oocytes decrease in its absence which lead to infertility.

== Discovery ==
NOBOX is an in silico subtraction discovery when Suzumori et al. searched for novel genes involved in early mammalian folliculogenesis in 2002. It is one of the several genes that appeared in the search in expressed sequence tag (EST) databases of mouse. It was then cloned and characterised for its genomic structure.

== Gene location ==
The human NOBOX is located in chromosome 7q35 while the mouse NOBOX is in proximal chromosome 6.

== Protein structure ==
The human NOBOX is a 14 kb protein and encoded by 8 exons. It has a proline rich C terminus and contains putative SH3 and WW domains. This C terminus is believed to be critical in its transcriptional activities when bound to oocyte-specific genes. NOBOX belongs to the family of proteins that contains homeodomain. Homeodomain is a stretch of 32 specific amino acids in primates downstream the NOBOX Arg303 residue and is very well-conserved among the species. It contains an asparagine residue at position 51 which is important for its interactions with DNA base pairs.

== Function ==
NOBOX is a homeobox gene that is preferentially expressed in oocytes. In mice, it is essential for folliculogenesis and regulation of oocyte-specific genes. Regulation of these oocyte-specific genes is thru direct binding of NOBOX to its promoter regions via the specific consensus sequences, the NOBOX DNA binding elements (NBEs). There are three NBEs that have been identified: 5'-TAATTG-3', 5'-TAGTTG-3', and 5'-TAATTA-3'. Knockout study of NOBOX against wild-type ovaries in newborn female mice revealed that 74% (28/38 genes) were downregulated more than 5-fold and 15% (5/33 genes) were upregulated more than 5-fold. However, microRNA population is not affected by NOBOX in newborn ovaries. NOBOX also plays an important role in the suppression of male-determining genes such as Dmrt1. Its deficiency can cause rapid loss of postnatal oocytes and during its absence in female mice, follicles are replaced by fibrous tissue. Recently, a new role of NOBOX in controlling the G2/M arrest was discovered.

== Mutations and clinical significance ==
A mutation in the NOBOX gene is associated with premature ovarian failure (POF), also known as premature ovarian insufficiency (POI). It is a condition which ovaries loss its normal function before the age of 40. It is a heritable disease in up to 30% of patients which is characterised by secondary infertility, amenorrhea, hypoestrogenism, and elevated follicle-stimulating hormone levels in the serum (FSH>40IU/liter). It affects ≈1% of women below 40 years old. A study conducted on 96 white women with POF revealed one case of heterozygous mutation in the NOBOX homeodomain, p.Arg355His, in one patient. This mutation was absent in the control population and significantly disrupts the binding of NOBOX to the NBE. Arg355 is critical to DNA binding and is conserved in the homeodomain of the NOBOX from zebrafish to humans. Moreover, its significant negative effect suggests that NOBOX homeodomain may function as a dimer but its rare occurrence suggests a low contribution to POF. Further investigations on POF were conducted on Caucasian, African, Chinese, and Japanese women diagnosed with POF. Several NOBOX loss-of-function mutations were observed in Caucasian and African women accounting to 6.2%, 5.6% and 6.4%. These results suggest that NOBOX gene is a strong autosomal candidate for POF and its genetic mechanism involves haploinsufficiency. However, these mutations were not found in Chinese and Japanese women making it a less common explanation for POF in the region.

The POF syndrome is a highly heterogenous clinical disorder but a recent study showed the first homozygous mutation associated with NOBOX loss-of-function. One patient out of 96 population diagnosed with POF in China was found with one novel homozygous truncating variant in the NOBOX gene. This truncated variant caused a defective transcriptional activation of GDF9, a well-known target of NOBOX, which led to the lost ability of NOBOX to induce G2/M arrest. This finding disagrees that mutation is a less common explanation for POF in Asian population.

Understanding the mutations in NOBOX homeodomain is important to researchers and clinicians to develop diagnostic and therapeutic approaches for POF such as genetic control of mammalian reproductive life-span, regulation of fertility, and generation of mature eggs in the lab.

== Interactions ==
1. GDF9
2. POU5F1
3. DNMT10
4. FOXL2
5. FIGLA
6. RSPO2
7. DMRT1
