= Low anterior hairline =

- Other names: Low frontal hairline Low-set frontal hairline
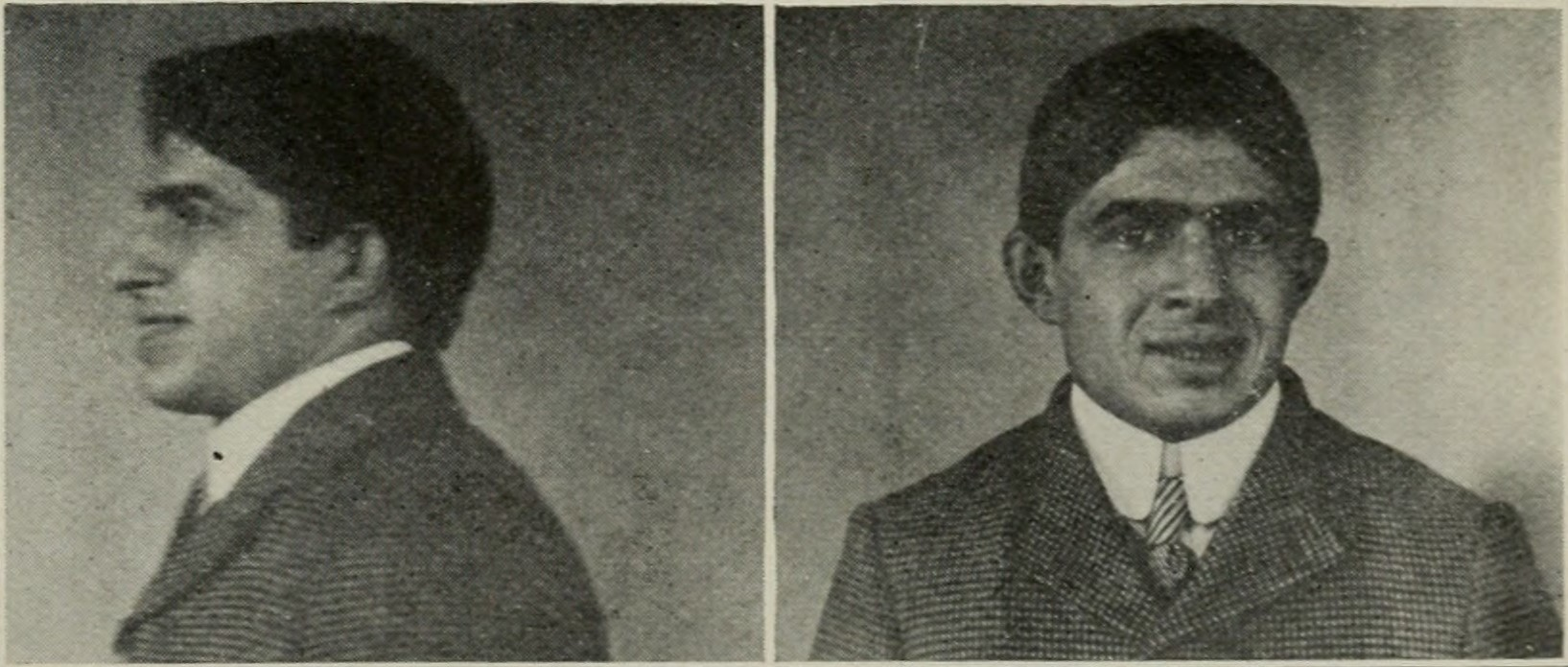
- Low anterior hairline on a 20-year-old with intellectual disability

Low anterior hairline is a dysmorphic feature in which the frontal hairline which defines the top and sides of the forehead is unusually low. This can mean that either the distance between the trichion (hairline) and glabella at the midline is more than 2 standard deviations below the mean, or that this distance is apparently (subjectively) decreased.

== Conditions ==
Low anterior hairline is seen in the following conditions and syndromes:

- 8q22.1 microdeletion syndrome
- Adams-Oliver syndrome 2
- Agenesis of the corpus callosum with peripheral neuropathy
- ALG11-congenital disorder of glycosylation
- Barber-Say syndrome
- Blepharophimosis - intellectual disability syndrome, Verloes type
- Bohring-Opitz syndrome
- Cataract - congenital heart disease - neural tube defect syndrome
- Cerebellar atrophy, visual impairment, and psychomotor retardation
- Coffin-Siris syndrome 5 and 12
- COG7 congenital disorder of glycosylation
- Congenital lactic acidosis, Saguenay-Lac-Saint-Jean type
- Cornelia de Lange syndrome 3 and 5
- Craniosynostosis 6
- Deficiency of alpha-mannosidase
- Deletion of long arm of chromosome 18
- DOORS syndrome
- Dysmorphism-conductive hearing loss-heart defect syndrome
- Ectodermal dysplasia 13, hair/tooth type
- Fanconi anemia, complementation group S
- Focal facial dermal dysplasia type III
- Fontaine progeroid syndrome
- Hereditary spastic paraplegia 49
- Intellectual disability, autosomal dominant 14, 42, and 52
- KBG syndrome
- Lissencephaly 7 with cerebellar hypoplasia
- Megalocornea-intellectual disability syndrome
- MEGF8-related Carpenter syndrome
- Microcephaly, short stature, and impaired glucose metabolism 1
- Muenke syndrome
- Nicolaides-Baraitser syndrome
- Pontocerebellar hypoplasia, IIA 17
- Rubinstein-Taybi syndrome due to CREBBP mutations

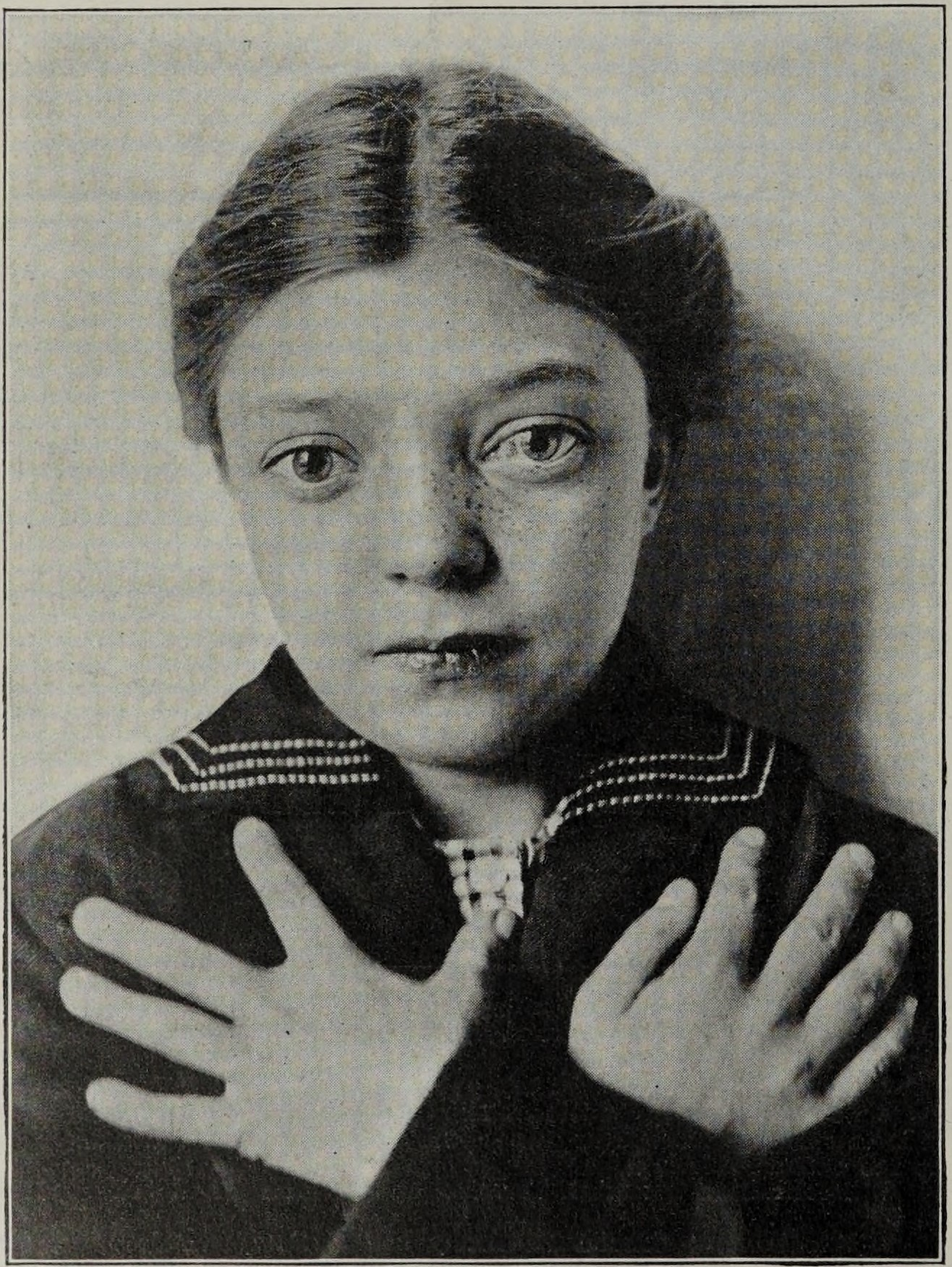
Low anterior hairline in Saethre-Chotzen syndrome

- Saethre-Chotzen syndrome
- SCARF syndrome
- Skin creases, congenital symmetric circumferential, 2
- Spondyloepimetaphyseal dysplasia, Bieganski type
- Spondyloepimetaphyseal dysplasia, Genevieve type
- TCF12-related craniosynostosis
- Vertebral anomalies and variable endocrine and T-cell dysfunction
- Warburg Micro syndrome 2, 3, and 4
- Zimmermann-Laband syndrome 1 and 3

== See also ==
- High anterior hairline
