= Doublesex =

Gene of insects

Identifiers
- Organism: Drosophila melanogaster
- Symbol: dsx
- UniProt: P23023
Search for
- Structures: Swiss-model
- Domains: InterPro

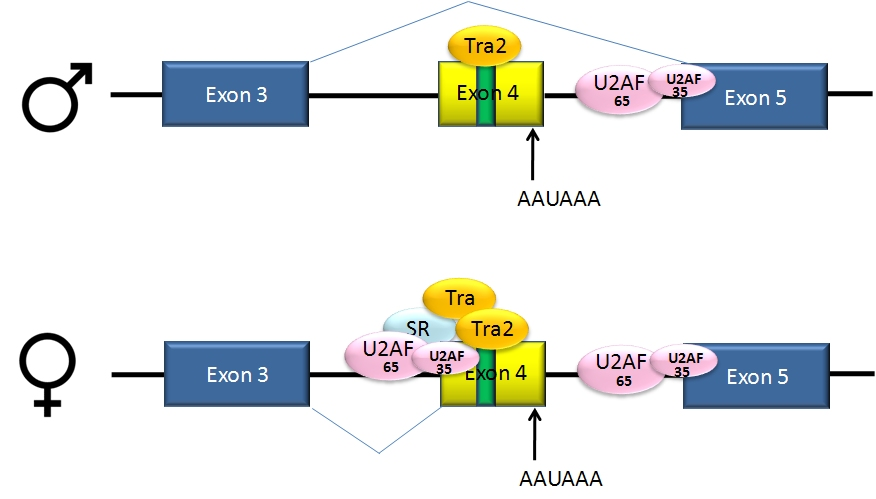
Alternative splicing of dsx pre-mRNA. Tra2 is a transformer protein; the gene is involved in the regulation of sex determination in many insects.

Doublesex (dsx) is a gene that is involved in the sex determination system of many insects including the fruit fly Drosophila melanogaster.

== Sex determination ==
The gene is expressed in both male and female flies and is subject to alternative splicing, producing the protein isoforms dsx^{f} in females and the longer dsx^{m} in males. The production of dsx^{f} is caused by the presence of the female-specific version of the transformer (tra) gene.

In a sense, the isoform of dsx informs a cell about the organism's sex; for instance, female genitals only develop if dsx^{f} is present. In conjunction with the gene fruitless, dsx also causes differences in the brain structure and behavior of males and females.

Although the details of sex determination differ in the various species, there is a gene related to dsx in vertebrates (DMRT1) and in nematodes (MAB-3). All of these are transcription factors with a zinc finger DNA-binding domain (known as the DM domain) and are involved in sex-specific differentiation.
