= PMOF =

PMOF may refer to:

- Presidential Medal of Freedom
- Premature Ovarian Failure (gynecology), also called Primary ovarian insufficiency
- Project Management Organization Framework (Project portfolio management)
- Post-Traumatic Multiple Organ Failure (Multiple organ dysfunction syndrome)
- Persistent Memory over Fabrics (PMoF)
