= DMRT3 =

Mammalian gene

DMRT3 (Doublesex and mab-3 related transcription factor 3) is a conserved gene coding for a transcription factor. In humans it is expressed in testicle, thyroid and brain, and in the spinal cord in mouse. The gene has gained attention for its role in the development of spinal cord neural circuits that control locomotion in mammals, but it is also involved in male sex differentiation

== Gene ==
The human gene is found on chromosome 9p24.3 together with DMRT1 och DMRT2. The gene is protein-coding and consists of two exons. Orthologs are found in species including the horse, mouse, rat and zebrafish.

== Structure ==
DMRT3 is part of the DMRT family of transcription factors. They share a DM-domain that mediates sequence-specific DNA-binding to the minor groove of DNA. This differs from many classical zinc-finger domains, which bind to the major groove of DNA..

== Role in locomotion ==
DMRT3 is particularly well known for its role in the development and function of spinal cord neural circuits that control locomotion in mammals. In mice, Dmrt3 is expressed in neural cells and germ cells, and the protein serves as a marker for a subset of dI6 interneurons in the spinal cord. When Dmrt3 is knocked out in mice, they exhibit essentially normal coordination and balance at low speeds, but struggle to run at higher speeds, showing impaired coordination between the left and right sides of the body, as well as between the forelimbs and hindlimbs.

In horses, a nonsense mutation in DMRT3, DMRT3_Ser301STOP, influences movement patterns. The mutation results in a premature stop codon, which leads to a truncated protein. Studies of horses with alternative gaits, such as the tölt and the pace, have shown that this mutation is common in these breeds, thereby facilitating such alternative movement patterns. It has also been observed that the mutation occurs in horses capable of trotting at high speeds without transitioning into a gallop.

== Regulation of chromatin ==
Research on neural progenitor cells suggests that DMRT3 is also involved in regulating chromatin accessibility. As DMRT3 expression decreases during neural differentiation, the chromatin opens up; this has been interpreted to mean that DMRT3 acts as a transcriptional repressor, helping to maintain certain gene regions in a closed chromatin state within progenitor cells
