= Nablus mask-like facial syndrome =

Rare genetic condition

- Other names: 8q22.1 microdeletion syndrome Nablus syndrome
- Symptoms: Blepharophimosis, fleshy skin
- Usual onset: At birth
- Differential diagnosis: Young-Simpson syndrome Pashayan syndrome BPES; Schwartz-Jampel syndrome
- Treatment: Blepharoplasty (to correct opening of the palpebral fissures)
- Frequency: 0.0001%

Nablus mask-like facial syndrome (Nablus syndrome) is a rare (13 cases described by 2018) genetic condition. It is a microdeletion syndrome triggered by a deletion at chromosome 8 q22.1 that causes a mask-like facial appearance in those affected. This syndrome typically presents itself in infants, specifically newborns.

== Signs and symptoms ==
Head

- Microcephaly - condition in which the head is unusually small, especially in babies
- Bitemporal narrowing - the temples are abnormally narrow and sunken in appearance
- Asymmetric skull

Face

- Expressionless
- Mask-like facial appearance, to include tight, glistening facial skin
- Retrognathia - the lower jaw bone (mandible) is positioned further back than normal

Ears

- Triangular ears
- Low positioned, upward pointing ears

Eyes

- Hypertelorism - widely positioned eyes
- Limited eyelashes and eyebrows

Nose

- Short, flat nose
- Prominent Glabella - protruding glabella, just above the nasal root

Extremities

- Camptodactyly - inability to extend fingers completely
- Joint deformities

Genitalia

- Cryptorchidism - undescended testicles in males

Neurologic

- Developmental delay
- Happy demeanor

== Diagnosis ==
A number of genetic screenings can be performed to diagnose this syndrome, including array-based comparative genomic hybridization (CGH), fluorescence in situ hybridization (FISH) analysis, karyotyping, and multiplex ligation-dependent probe amplification (MLPA) based techniques. Post-natal diagnoses are more common, but antenatal diagnoses are also possible through some of these genetic screenings.

=== Array-based comparative genomic hybridization (CGH) ===
CGH involves the isolation of DNA from the two sources being compared, the labelling of each sample with fluorophores of different colors, denaturation to form single-stranded DNA, and the hybridization of the two resulting samples to metaphase chromosomes. Then the differently colored fluorescent signals are compared along each chromosome to identify copy number changes. However, CGH is only able to detect unbalanced chromosomal abnormalities, such as the microdeletion which causes Nablus mask-like facial syndrome.

=== FISH analysis ===
FISH analysis uses fluorescent probes that only bind a certain part of a nucleic acid sequence, originally developed to identify the presence or absence of certain DNA sequences on chromosomes. After the fluorescent probe is bound to the chromosomes, fluorescence microscopy is used to find its location on the chromosomes.

=== Karyotyping ===
In general, karyotyping refers to the use of metaphase chromosome imaging to determine an individual's chromosome complement. A karyotype displays the number of chromosomes as well as chromosomal abnormalities through specific banding patterns. In the case of Nablus mask-like facial syndrome, the microdeletion is extremely small, so karyotyping is probably a more difficult technique to use in screening for this disease.

=== MLPA based techniques ===
Using the multiplex PCR which allows amplification of multiple targets with a single primer pair, MLPA detects copy number changes which are then analyzed by software programs. Copy number changes refer to deletions or duplications, therefore making these techniques able to diagnose Nablus mask-like facial syndrome by detecting its causal microdeletion.

== Treatment ==
Many physical signs, such as cryptorchidism, camptodactyly or joint deformities can be treated surgically. Additionally, plastic surgery and facial reconstruction may assist in lessening the signs of the syndrome. There are currently no clinical trials occurring to find a new treatment for the syndrome.

== Genetics ==
Chromosome 8

Location on Chromosome 8 (q22.1)

Nablus syndrome is under the class of contiguous gene syndromes, which result from a deletion mutation that affects a number of genes located in close proximity on a chromosome. The mutation for Nabulus syndrome is a microdeletion mutation in the long arm of chromosome 8 (8q22.1). The specific genomic coordinates for this mutation are (GFCh38): 8:92,300,000–97,900,000, which span approximately 5.6 million base pairs. Its inheritance pattern is thought to be autosomal dominant, but this has not been confirmed due to the rareness of the disease. The microdeletion at 8q22.1 has been observed in at least one patient who did not show the clinical features of the Nablus syndrome, which indicates a spectra of phenotypes (see Signs and Symptoms), dependent on the particular genes affected by the microdeletion in the 8:92,300,000-97,900,000 region of chromosome 8.

== Epidemiology ==
It is a rare genetic disorder found in Palestine in 2000 by Ahmad Teebi. Teebi named it after Nablus, the city in the West Bank which it was discovered in. It is part of many new genetic disorders of newborns that is increasing exponentially in Arabs in recent years as reported by Centre for Arab Genomic Studies in Dubai. As of 2018, there were 13 diagnosed cases.
