= POF1B =

Protein-coding gene in the species Homo sapiens

Identifiers
- Aliases: POF1B, POF, POF2B, premature ovarian failure, 1B, actin binding protein, POF1B actin binding protein, FLJ22792
- External IDs: OMIM: 300603; MGI: 1916943; GeneCards: POF1B
Available structures
PDB	Ortholog search: PDBe RCSB
PDB	List of PDB id codes 3BH9

Gene location (Human)
Chr.	X chromosome (human)
Band	Xq21.1	Start	85,277,396 bp
Band	Xq21.1	End	85,379,717 bp

Gene location (Mouse)
Chr.	X chromosome (mouse)
Band	X|X E1	Start	111,548,128 bp
Band	X|X E1	End	111,608,348 bp
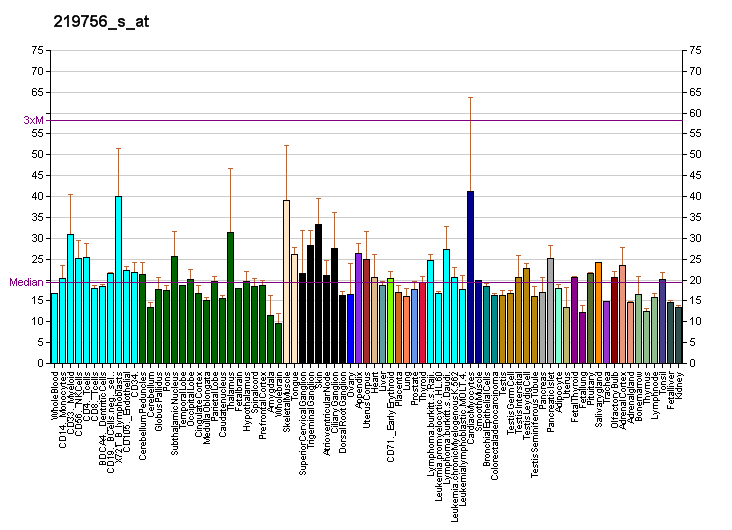
RNA expression pattern
Bgee	Human / Mouse (ortholog); Top expressed in: skin of arm; skin of leg; skin of abdomen; rectum; skin of thigh; mucosa of sigmoid colon; skin of hip; jejunal mucosa; gums; mucosa of transverse colon / Top expressed in: skin of external ear; skin of back; epidermis; hair follicle; umbilical cord; conjunctival fornix; transitional epithelium of urinary bladder; left colon; epithelium of stomach; mucous cell of stomach; More reference expression data
BioGPS	More reference expression data
Gene ontology
Molecular function	actin binding; actin filament binding
Cellular component	desmosome; cell junction; actin filament; adherens junction; bicellular tight junction
Biological process	epithelial cell morphogenesis; actin filament organization; actin cytoskeleton organization; bicellular tight junction assembly
Sources:Amigo / QuickGO
Orthologs
Databases	NCBI: entry; OMA: entry
Species	Human	Mouse
Entrez	79983	69693
Ensembl	ENSG00000124429	ENSMUSG00000034607
UniProt	Q8WVV4	Q8K4L4
RefSeq (mRNA)	NM_001307940; NM_024921	NM_181579
RefSeq (protein)	NP_001294869; NP_079197	NP_853557
Location (UCSC)	Chr X: 85.28 – 85.38 Mb	Chr X: 111.55 – 111.61 Mb
PubMed search
- Wikidata
View/Edit Human	View/Edit Mouse

Protein POF1B is a protein that in humans is encoded by the POF1B gene. This protein regulates the actin cytoskeleton, which is important for the organization of epithelial cells. It may have a role in the development of the ovaries.

== See also ==
- Primary ovarian insufficiency
