= HFM1 =

Protein-coding gene in humans

Identifiers
- Aliases: HFM1, MER3, POF9, SEC63D1, Si-11, Si-11-6, helicase, ATP-dependent DNA helicase homolog, ATP dependent DNA helicase homolog, helicase for meiosis 1
- External IDs: OMIM: 615684; MGI: 3036246; GeneCards: HFM1
Enzyme activity
EC #	BRENDA	ExPASy	KEGG	MetaCyc
5.6.2.4	↗	↗	↗	↗

Gene location (Human)
Chr.	Chromosome 1 (human)
Band	1p22.2	Start	91,260,766 bp
Band	1p22.2	End	91,404,856 bp

Gene location (Mouse)
Chr.	Chromosome 5 (mouse)
Band	5|5 E5	Start	106,840,192 bp
Band	5|5 E5	End	106,926,321 bp
RNA expression pattern
Bgee	Human / Mouse (ortholog); Top expressed in: testicle; gonad; pituitary gland; anterior pituitary; right testis; left testis; ventricular zone; cerebellar hemisphere; right hemisphere of cerebellum; ganglionic eminence / Top expressed in: spermatocyte; spermatid; testicle; ganglionic eminence; mesencephalon; ventricular zone; embryo; embryo; neural tube; secondary oocyte; More reference expression data
BioGPS	n/a
Gene ontology
Molecular function	ATP binding; hydrolase activity; nucleotide binding; nucleic acid binding; helicase activity
Cellular component	nucleolus; cytoplasm
Biological process	resolution of meiotic recombination intermediates; meiosis; RNA secondary structure unwinding
Sources:Amigo / QuickGO
Orthologs
Databases	NCBI: entry; OMA: entry
Species	Human	Mouse
Entrez	164045	330149
Ensembl	ENSG00000162669	ENSMUSG00000043410
UniProt	A2PYH4; C9JQ07	D3Z4R1
RefSeq (mRNA)	NM_001017975	NM_001252516; NM_177873
RefSeq (protein)	NP_001017975	NP_001239445; NP_808541
Location (UCSC)	Chr 1: 91.26 – 91.4 Mb	Chr 5: 106.84 – 106.93 Mb
PubMed search
- Wikidata
View/Edit Human	View/Edit Mouse

HFM1 is a gene that in humans encodes a protein necessary for homologous recombination of chromosomes. Biallelic mutations in HFM1 cause recessive primary ovarian insufficiency.
