= High anterior hairline =

- Other names: High frontal hairline
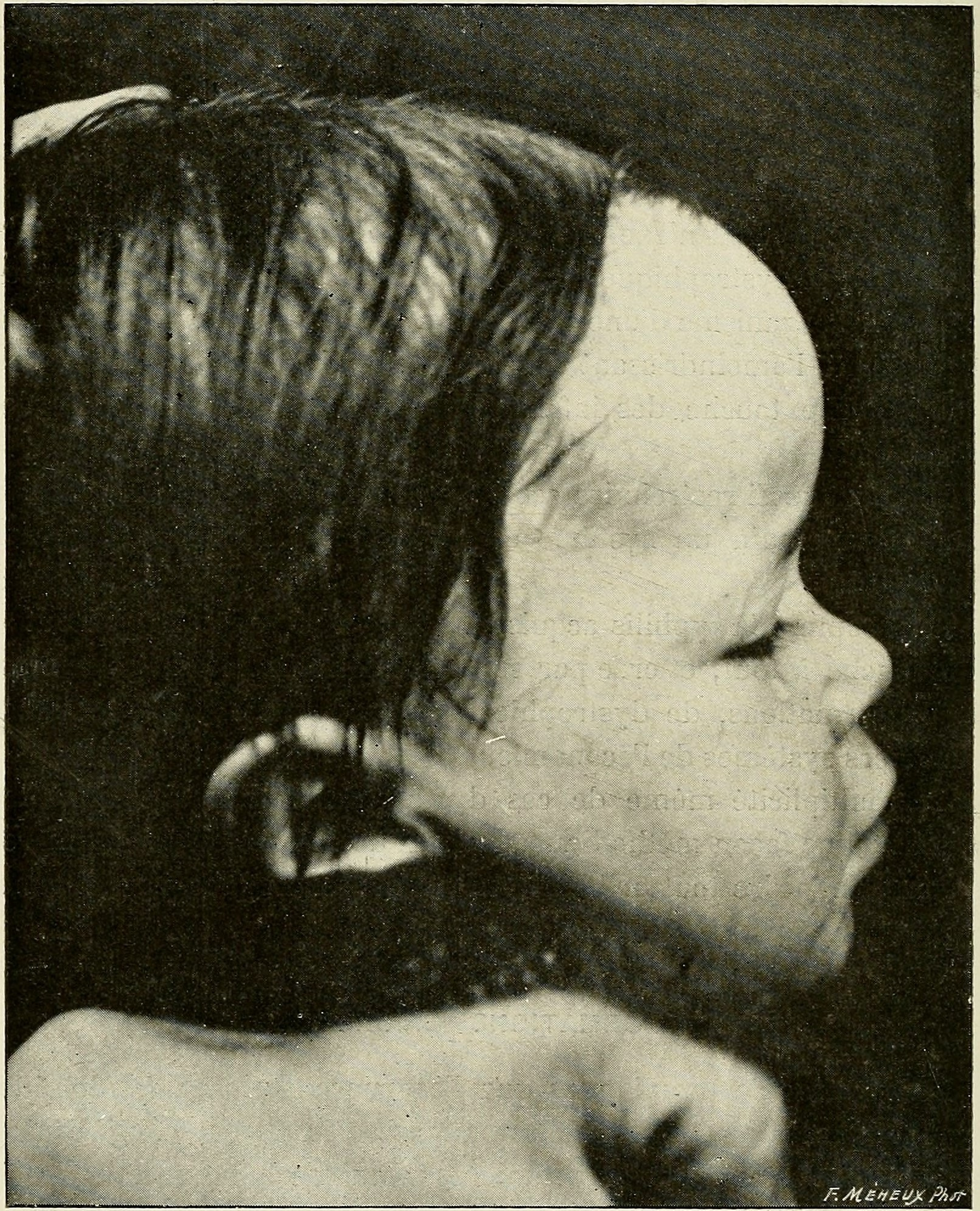
- High anterior hairline with frontal bossing in congenital syphilis

High anterior hairline is a dysmorphic feature in which the frontal hairline which defines the top and sides of the forehead is unusually high. This can mean that either the distance between the trichion (hairline) and glabella is more than 2 SD above the mean, or that this distance is apparently (subjectively) increased.

== Conditions ==
High anterior hairline is seen in the following conditions and syndromes:

- ADNP-related multiple congenital anomalies
- Alacrima, achalasia, and intellectual disability syndrome
- Blepharophimosis - intellectual disability syndrome, MKB type
- Cardiac malformation, cleft lip/palate, microcephaly, and digital anomalies
- Coffin-Siris syndrome 12
- Congenital disorder of glycosylation, type Iw, autosomal dominant
- Congenital heart defects and ectodermal dysplasia
- Curry-Jones syndrome
- Developmental and epileptic encephalopathy, 83
- Granulocytopenia with immunoglobulin abnormality
- Intellectual developmental disorder with hypertelorism and distinctive facies
- Intellectual developmental disorder, X-linked 108
- Metaphyseal chondrodysplasia-retinitis pigmentosa syndrome
- Neurodevelopmental disorder with hypotonia and brain abnormalities
- Neurodevelopmental disorder with hypotonia and dysmorphic facies
- Neurofacioskeletal syndrome with or without renal agenesis
- Noonan syndrome 4
- Orofacial cleft 15
- SIN3A-related intellectual disability syndrome due to a point mutation
- Singleton-Merten syndrome 1

== See also ==
- Hair loss
- Low anterior hairline
