= Blepharophimosis =

Congenital anomaly in which the eye openings are small

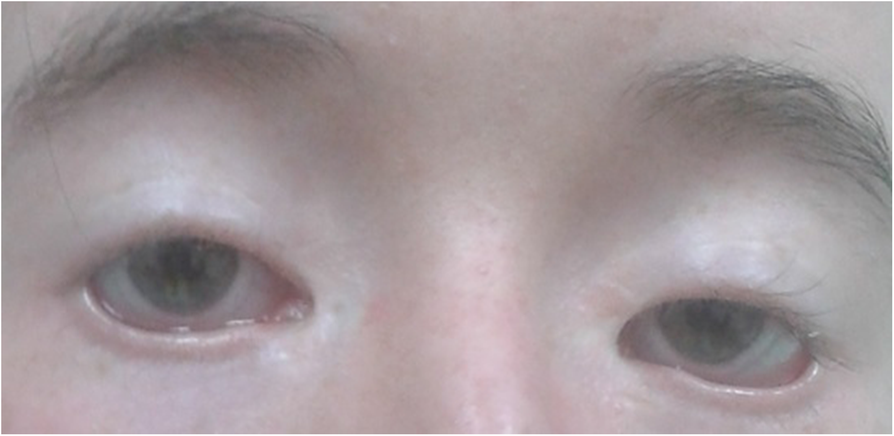
- 18-year-old female with blepharophimosis as a result of blepharophimosis, ptosis, epicanthus inversus syndrome (BPES) type 1
- Specialty: Medical genetics

Blepharophimosis is a congenital anomaly in which the eyelids are underdeveloped such that they cannot open as far as usual and permanently cover part of the eyes. The horizontal palpebral fissure (eyelid opening) is shortened; the eyes also appear spaced more widely apart as a result, known as telecanthus.

== Presentation ==
In addition to small palpebral fissures, features can include epicanthus inversus (fold curving in the mediolateral direction, inferior to the inner canthus), low nasal bridge, ptosis of the eyelids and telecanthus.

=== Associated conditions ===
Blepharophimosis forms a part of blepharophimosis, ptosis, epicanthus inversus syndrome (BPES), also called blepharophimosis syndrome, which is an autosomal dominant condition characterised by blepharophimosis, ptosis (upper eyelid drooping), epicanthus inversus (skin folds by the nasal bridge, more prominent lower than upper lid) and telecanthus (widening of the distance between the inner corners of the eyelids). The nasal bridge is flat and there is a hypoplastic orbital rim. It may also be associated with lop ears, ectropion and hypertelorism.

There are two known types, type 1 and type 2. Although research is limited, it is known that type 1 and 2 are expressed with the same symptoms mentioned above, but type 1 also has the characteristic of premature ovarian insufficiency (POI) in women, which causes menopausal symptoms in patients as young as 15 years old. This is due to the shortening of the FOXL2 gene.

== History ==
Vignes (1889) probably first described this entity, a dysplasia of the eyelids.

== See also ==
- Ankyloblepharon
