= DM domain =

Protein family

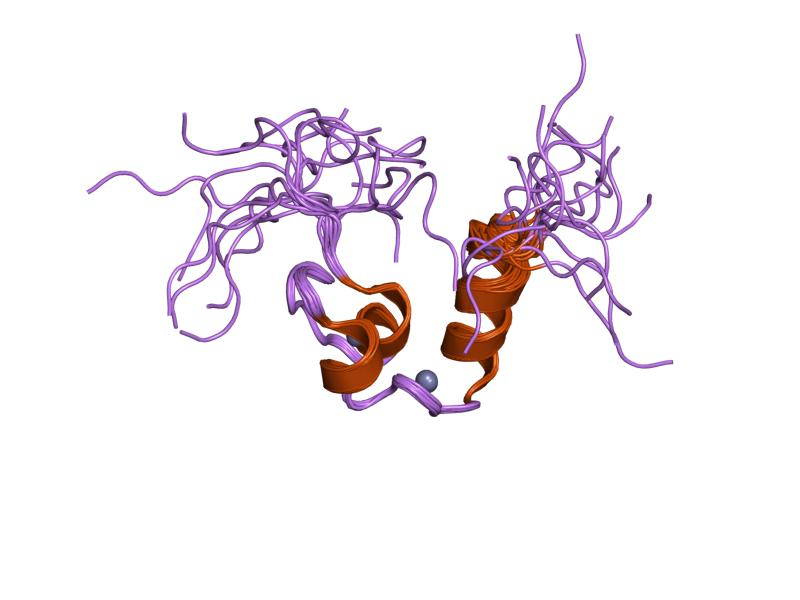
- Drosophila melanogaster doublesex (dsx), nmr, 18 structures

Identifiers
- Symbol: DM
- Pfam: PF00751
- InterPro: IPR001275
- SMART: SM00718
- SCOP2: 1rvv / SCOPe / SUPFAM
Available protein structures:
- PDB: IPR001275 PF00751 (ECOD; PDBsum)
- AlphaFold: IPR001275; PF00751

In molecular biology the DM domain is a protein domain first discovered in the doublesex proteins of Drosophila melanogaster and is also seen in C. elegans and mammalian proteins. In D. melanogaster the doublesex gene controls somatic sexual differentiation by producing alternatively spliced mRNAs encoding related sex-specific polypeptides. These proteins are believed to function as transcription factors on downstream sex-determination genes, especially on neuroblast differentiation and yolk protein genes transcription.

The DM domain binds DNA as a dimer, allowing the recognition of pseudopalindromic sequences . The NMR analysis of the DSX DM domain revealed a novel zinc module containing 'intertwined' CCHC and HCCC zinc-binding sites. The recognition of the DNA requires the carboxy-terminal basic tail which contacts the minor groove of the target sequence.

== Proteins with this domain ==
Proteins with the DM domain are found in many model organisms. Many C. elegans Mab proteins contain this domain, the best-known one being mab-3. Human proteins containing this domain include DMRT1, DMRT2, DMRT3, DMRTA1, DMRTA2, DMRTB1, and DMRTC2; each of these have a mouse homolog.

Dmrt1-specific

Identifiers
- Symbol: Dmrt1
- Pfam: PF12374
- InterPro: IPR022114
Available protein structures:
- PDB: IPR022114 PF12374 (ECOD; PDBsum)
- AlphaFold: IPR022114; PF12374

DMRT1 homologs have an additional common domain C-terminal to the DM domain. This domain is only found in bony vertebrates, and neither its structure nor function is unknown. Jpred predicts the human version of the section to be mostly coils; it also suggests a weak similarity to PDB: 6BO4 by BLAST.

DMRTA motif

Identifiers
- Symbol: DMA
- Pfam: PF03474
- InterPro: IPR005173
Available protein structures:
- PDB: IPR005173 PF03474 (ECOD; PDBsum)
- AlphaFold: IPR005173; PF03474

DMRTA proteins have an additional motif in their C-termina. This motif, ubiquitous in eukaryotes, has an unknown function. It is similar in sequence to some ubiquitin-associated motifs.
