= Blepharophimosis, ptosis, epicanthus inversus syndrome =

Rare genetic condition involving underdeveloped eyelids

- Other names: Blepharophimosis types 1 and 2
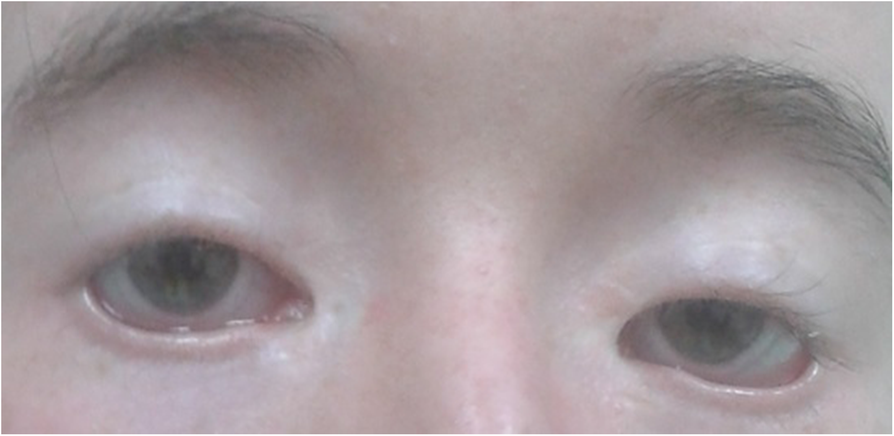
- 18-year-old female with BPES type 1

This condition is inherited in an autosomal dominant manner.

Blepharophimosis, ptosis, epicanthus inversus syndrome (BPES) is a rare medical anomaly characterized by the conditions it is named after: blepharophimosis, ptosis and epicanthus inversus. There are two types; type 1 is distinguished from type 2 by including the symptom of premature ovarian insufficiency (POI) in females, which causes menopausal symptoms and infertility in patients as young as 15 years old.

== Signs and symptoms ==
The most prominent symptoms of BPES are horizontally narrow eyes (blepharophimosis), drooping eyelids (ptosis) and a fold of skin running from the side of the nose to the lower eyelid (epicanthus inversus). Other common symptoms include lack of an eyelid fold, an appearance of widely spaced eyes (telecanthus), low nose bridge and ear malformations (including cupping and incomplete development). Rare symptoms include microphthalmos (abnormally small eyes), tear ducts in the wrong location and a high-arched palate. Type 1 BPES is distinguished by including premature ovarian insufficiency (POI) in females, which causes menopausal symptoms and infertility in patients as young as 15 years old. Type 2 is identified by the development of an abnormal eyelid and no infertility in either men or women.

== Genetics ==
BPES is caused by a mutation in the gene FOXL2, located at 3q23 (band 23 on the long arm of chromosome 3). There are two types, caused by different mutations in this gene, but both follow an autosomal dominant pattern of inheritance.

== Diagnosis ==
Though BPES can be suggested by the presence of blepharophimosis, ptosis and/or epicanthus inversus, it can only be definitively diagnosed by genetic testing. A small percentage of patients tend to have a systematic disorder in addition to blepharophimosis. Other disorders that appear similar include Waardenburg syndrome and Ohdo blepharophimosis syndrome.

== Treatment ==
The main treatment is symptomatic, since the underlying genetic defect cannot be corrected as of 2015. Symptomatic treatment is surgical.

== Epidemiology ==
BPES is rare as it only appears in 1 in 50,000 individuals. It affects slightly more males than females.

== Famous Patients ==
Notable patients who have BPES include:

- Tim McMullan
- Billy Redden
- Zoe Angeli
