= Bone morphogenetic protein 15 =

Protein-coding gene in humans

BMP15

Identifiers
- Aliases: BMP15, GDF9B, ODG2, POF4, bone morphogenetic protein 15
- External IDs: OMIM: 300247; MGI: 1316745; GeneCards: BMP15

Gene location (Human)
Chr.	X chromosome (human)
Band	Xp11.22	Start	50,910,735 bp
Band	Xp11.22	End	50,916,641 bp

Gene location (Mouse)
Chr.	X chromosome (mouse)
Band	X A1.1|X 2.81 cM	Start	6,226,161 bp
Band	X A1.1|X 2.81 cM	End	6,232,775 bp
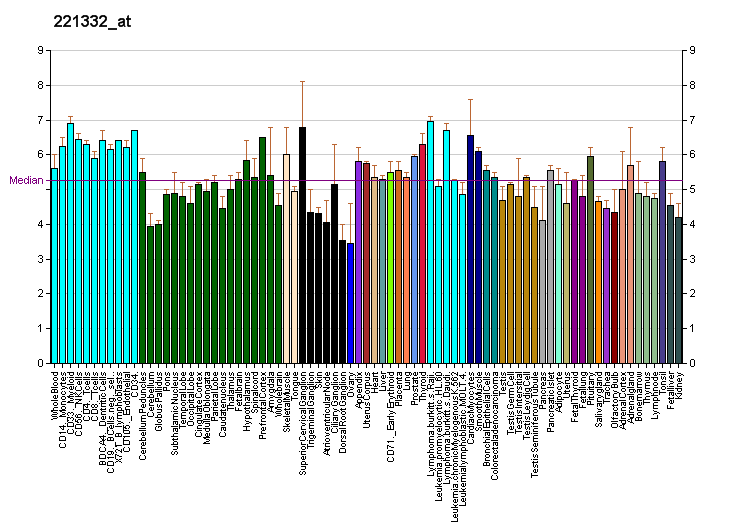
RNA expression pattern
Bgee	Human / Mouse (ortholog); Top expressed in: secondary oocyte; fallopian tube; ventricular zone; olfactory zone of nasal mucosa; ovary; left ovary / Top expressed in: secondary oocyte; zygote; primary oocyte; lumbar spinal ganglion; egg cell; embryo; morula; cumulus cell; seminal vesicula; gastrula; More reference expression data
BioGPS	More reference expression data
Gene ontology
Molecular function	transforming growth factor beta receptor binding; growth factor activity; cytokine activity
Cellular component	cytoplasm; extracellular region; extracellular space; endoplasmic reticulum lumen
Biological process	ovarian follicle development; female gamete generation; positive regulation of pathway-restricted SMAD protein phosphorylation; BMP signaling pathway; regulation of apoptotic process; regulation of MAPK cascade; cell development; granulosa cell development; SMAD protein signal transduction; positive regulation of transcription, DNA-templated; post-translational protein modification; regulation of signaling receptor activity
Sources:Amigo / QuickGO
Orthologs
Databases	NCBI: entry; OMA: entry
Species	Human	Mouse
Entrez	9210	12155
Ensembl	ENSG00000130385	ENSMUSG00000023279
UniProt	O95972	Q9Z0L4
RefSeq (mRNA)	NM_005448	NM_009757
RefSeq (protein)	NP_005439	NP_033887
Location (UCSC)	Chr X: 50.91 – 50.92 Mb	Chr X: 6.23 – 6.23 Mb
PubMed search
- Wikidata
View/Edit Human	View/Edit Mouse

Bone morphogenetic protein 15 (BMP-15) is a protein that in humans is encoded by the BMP15 gene. It is involved in folliculogenesis, the process in which primordial follicles develop into pre-ovulatory follicles.

== Structure ==
The BMP-15 gene is located on the X-chromosome and using Northern blot analysis BMP-15 mRNA is locally expressed within the ovaries in oocytes only after they have started to undergo the primary stages of development. BMP-15 is translated as a preproprotein that is composed of a single peptide, which contains a proregion and a smaller mature region. Intracellular processing then leads to the removal of the proregion, leaving the biologically active mature region to perform the functions. This protein is a member of the Transforming growth factor beta (TGF-β) superfamily and is a paracrine signalling molecule. Most active BMPs have a common structure, in which they contain 7 cysteines, 6 of which form three intramolecular disulphide bonds and the seventh being involved in the formation of dimers with other monomers. BMP-15 is an exception to this as the molecule does not contain the seventh cysteine. Instead in BMP-15 the fourth cysteine is replaced by a serine.

== Interactions ==
BMP-15 and GDF9 interact with each other and work synergistically to have similar interactions with the target cell. BMP15 can act as a heterodimer with GDF9 or on its own as a homodimer. In most of the BMP family heterodimers and homodimers form as the seventh cysteine is involved in the formation of a covalent bond, leading the dimerization. However, in the BMP-15 the homodimers form as a non-covalent bond is present between two BMP-15 subunits.

== Function ==
Functions of BMP-15 include

- Promotion of growth and maturation of ovarian follicles, starting from the primary gonadotrophin-independent phases of folliculogenesis.
- Regulation of the sensitivity of granulosa cells to follicle-stimulating hormone (FSH) action, contributing to the determination of the number of eggs that are ovulated.
- Prevention of granulosa cell apoptosis.

=== Folliculogenesis ===
Folliculogenesis is an important process for the development and maintenance of fertility. Primordial follicles are stored in the ovary and throughout life are activated to go through morphological changes to become preovulatory follicles ready for ovulation, when the oocyte is released into the fallopian tube of the female reproductive tract.

BMP-15 main functions are crucial for the beginning of folliculogenesis as seen in Image 1. The primordial follicle is made up of the oocyte and a single layer of flattened granulosa cells. BMP-15 is released from the oocyte into the surrounding granulosa tissue where it binds to two membrane bound receptors on granulosa cells. This promotes granulosa cell proliferation via mitosis. BMP-15 promotes the change of primordial to primary and secondary follicles which are surrounded by several granulosa cell layers but doesn't promote transition into preovulatory follicles. BMP-15 prevents differentiation into preovulatory follicle by inhibiting FSH action in granulosa. FSH is released by the anterior pituitary as part of the hypothalamic-pituitary-gonadal axis and promotes the differentiation of early follicles into later preovulatory ones. BMP-15 prevents this transition by inhibiting the production of FSH receptor mRNA in granulosa cells. Therefore, FSH cannot bind to the granulosa cells, this inhibits FSH dependent progesterone production and luteinization, subsequently granulosa cells do not differentiate.

As BMP-15 acts directly on granulosa cells it has an important influence on granulosa function including steroidogenesis inhibition of luteinization and differentiation of cumulus, without which would lead to infertility and lack of folliculogenesis.

== Differences between species ==
The use of mammalian species other than human is often used in research to learn more about human biology.

=== Sheep ===
Two breeds of sheep, Inverdale and Hanna, are naturally heterozygous carriers of point mutations in the BMP-15 gene. These point mutations result in higher ovulation rates and larger litter sizes than sheep strains with a wildtype BMP-15 genotype. This super-fertility was mimicked later through immunization of wildtype ewes against BMP-15 using various immunisation techniques. Sheep carrying homozygous alleles for the Inverdale and Hanna BMP-15 mutations are infertile, as they have streak ovaries and the primary stage of folliculogenesis is inhibited. These studies suggest that BMP-15 plays a vital role in the normal regulation of folliculogenesis and ovulation in sheep.

=== Mice ===
In mice, the BMP-15 homologue is not as physiologically important. Upon targeted deletion of a bmp15 exon, the mice presented with only subfertility in homozygotes and no clear aberrant phenotype in heterozygotes. The homozygous mutant mice did not suffer from reduced folliculogenesis or impacted follicle progression, unlike in the sheep homologue knockout experiments. The subfertility seen in the homozygous mutant phenotype was attributed to defective ovulation and reduced viability of embryos. Here it can be stated that BMP-15 is not as vital for normal female mouse fertility as it is for sheep.

=== Humans ===
Humans display a similar phenotype to the Inverdale/Hanna sheep in regards to female fertility. In women, a mutation in BMP-15 is linked to hypergonadotropic ovarian failure due to ovarian dysgenesis. In this case, the researchers were able to identify that the father of the two sisters displaying this mutation had no documented phenotype associated with the mutation, so BMP-15 appears to only affect females. In slight contrast to the reports on sheep, the women in this study were heterozygous for the BMP-15 mutation but exhibited streak ovaries, a phenotype very similar to the one seen in homozygous mutant ewes. The sisters presented with primary amenorrhea, showing that BMP-15 is also vital to normal human female fertility, concordant with the sheep model.

=== Current theory ===
The main theory for this stark difference between mammalian species relates to the number of follicles normally ovulated in each cycle by each species. Humans and sheep are mono-ovulatory, potentially explaining the difference in litter size observed in mutant individuals. As mice are poly-ovulatory, the role of BMP-15 in female mouse fertility may not be as obvious.

== Clinical relevance ==
Mutations within the gene for BMP-15 have been associated with reproductive complications in females, due to the X-linked nature of the protein. Due to its role in folliculogenesis, mutations can lead to sub-fertility through decreased or absent folliculogenesis. In combination with GDF-9, mutant BMP-15 is also associated with ovulation defects, premature ovarian failure and other reproductive pathologies.

BMP-15 defects have been implicated in female sterility, polyendocrine metabolic ovarian syndrome (PMOS), primary ovarian insufficiency (POI) and endometriosis. Women with PMOS have been noted to have higher levels of BMP-15, while missense mutations of the protein have been identified in females with POI.

Research has also found inherited mutant BMP-15 to be involved with the pathogenesis of hypergonadotropic ovarian failure. This condition develops due to BMP-15 role in folliculogenesis, and the errors that occur when a mutant gene is inherited. The protein is linked to familial ovarian dysgenesis which results in hypergonadotropic ovarian failure.

The importance of BMP-15 in ovulation and folliculogenesis has been highlighted by research into Turner syndrome, a chromosomal abnormality where females are missing a complete or partial X chromosome. Depending on the chromosomal mutation, BMP-15 gene dosage varies and impacts ovarian development in Turner syndrome patients. The gene is thus involved in determining the extent of the ovarian defects present in Turner syndrome.

BMP-15 is also present in animals and involved in reproduction, such as in mice and sheep. Reduced levels of BMP-15 in sheep have shown to increase ovulation, leading to larger litter sizes.
