= Multiple epidermal growth factor-like domains 8 =

Protein-coding gene in the species Homo sapiens

An Error has occurred retrieving Wikidata item for infobox

Megf8 also known as Multiple Epidermal Growth Factor-like Domains 8, is a protein coding gene that encodes a single pass membrane protein, known to participate in developmental regulation and cellular communication. It is located on chromosome 19 at the 49th open reading frame in humans (19q13.2). There are two isoform constructs known for MEGF8, which differ by a 67 amino acid indel. The isoform 2 splice version (analyzed throughout this page) is 2785 amino acids long, and predicted to be 296.6 kdal in mass. Isoform 1 is composed of 2845 amino acids and predicted to weigh 303.1 kdal. Using BLAST searches, orthologs were found primarily in mammals, but MEGF8 is also conserved in invertebrates and fishes, and rarely in birds, reptiles, and amphibians. A notably important paralog to multiple epidermal growth factor-like domains 8 is ATRNL1 (Attractin-like 1), which is also a single pass transmembrane protein, with several of the same key features and motifs as MEGF8, as indicated by Simple Modular Architecture Research Tool (SMART) which is hosted by the European Molecular Biology Laboratory located in Heidelberg, Germany. MEGF8 has been predicted to be a key player in several developmental processes, such as left-right patterning and limb formation. Currently, researchers have found MEGF8 SNP mutations to be the cause of Carpenter syndrome subtype 2.

== Gene ==
=== Evolution & Orthologs ===
A fairly highly conserved protein, MEGF8 has conserved orthologs from P. paniscus to N. vectensis. Orthologs are found in mammals, amphibians, fish, insects, crustaceans, and invertebrates. Organization of the data showed that as time since divergence between humans and orthologs increased, the sequence identity decreased.

Table 1: MEGF8 Orthologs
Genus/Species	Organism Common Name	Accession Number	Sequence Identity	Sequence Similarity	Length (AAs)
Pan Paniscus	Pygmy Chimpanzee	XP_003811808	99%	99%	2778
Bos Mutus	Yak	XP_005909034	79%	82%	2842
Orcinius Orca	Orca Whale	XP_004271289	93%	94%	2789
Trichechus manatus latirostris	Florida Manatee	XP_004388865	88%	89%	2708
Leptonychotes weddellii	Weddell Seal	XP_006748348	91%	92%	2068
Rattus norvegicus	Rat	NP_446080.1	88%	89%	2789
Mus musculus	Mouse	NP_001153872.1	89%	90%	2789
Ophiophagus hannah	King Cobra	ETE71721	63%	70%	404
Alligator mississippiensis	American Alligator	XP_006273703	63%	71%	2793
Alligator sinensis	Chinese alligator	XP_006038171	67%	75%	2465
Xenopus tropicalis	Western clawed frog	XP_002936442	56%	67%	2730
Neolamprologus brichardi	African Cichlid	XP_006808273	55%	67%	2813
Danio rerio	Zebra fish	XP_005158088	54%	66%	2870
IIctalurus punctatus	Channel Catfish	AHI50432	54%	77%	2875
Oryzias latipes	Japanese Rice Fish	XP_004078282	54%	67%	2952
Apis mellifera	Western Honey Bee	XP_006568067	31%	45%	2913
Ceratitis capitata	Mediterranean Fruit Fly	JAB95791	32%	45%	2959
Daphnia pulex	Common Water Flea	EFX84934	35%	48%	2888
Strongylocentrotus purpuratus	Purple Sea Urchin	XP_789561	37%	51%	194
Nematostella vectensis	Starlet Sea Anemone	XP_001635521	38%	51%	2534

=== Paralogs ===
MEGF8 has one known paralog: ATRNL1. The ATRNL1 protein is approximately half the length of MEGF8, and contains several of the same conserved domains, including the CUB domain and transmembrane sequence. ATRNL1 is found in many birds and amphibians, where MEGF8 is not found in any birds, and only one amphibian.

=== Promoters ===
Genomatix's ElDorado (http://www.genomatix.de/), a gene promoter database, predicted ten different possible promoters for megf8. The promoter having promoter ID number GXP_1262882 and transcript ID GXT_22531930, was predicted with the highest confidence. This promoter is located on the plus strand of chromosome 19, ranging from nucleotide 42829077 to 42830497, making it a 1421 nucleotide long sequence. The promoter sequence overlaps with the transcriptional start codon in the gene.

=== Transcription Factors ===
More than one hundred transcription factor binding sites were predicted to be found in the megf8 promoter region through Genomatix. The top twenty most confidently predicted factors include the following:

- Ccaat/Enhancer Binding Protein
- Vertebrate TATA binding protein factor
- CCAAT binding factors
- Activator-, mediator- and TBP-dependent core promoter element for RNA polymerase II transcription from TATA-less promoters
- Chorion-specific transcription factors with a GCM DNA binding domain
- Signal transducer and activator of transcription
- Heat shock factors (2 sites)
- GC-Box factors SP1/GC
- Estrogen response elements
- KRAB domain zinc finger protein 57
- Neuron-specific olfactory factor (2 sites)
- Nuclear respiratory factor 1
- RXR heterodimer binding sites
- GATA binding factors
- Nuclear receptor subfamily 2 factors
- Octamer binding protein
- EGR/nerve growth factor induced protein C & related factors
- Neuron-restrictive silencer factor

== Protein Architecture ==
=== Primary Structure ===
MEGF8 is composed of either 2845 amino acids (Isoform 1) or 2778 amino acids (Isoform 2). Isoform 2 undergoes a 67 amino acid removal from 700-766, which accounts for its shortened length; otherwise, the two isoforms are identical. Using SAPS, a Statistical Analysis of Protein Sequence software, amino acid bias was able to be determined. Isoform one is rich in cysteine and glycine, and deficient in isoleucine and lysine. Isoform 2 of MEGF8 was found to have very high levels of cysteine, moderately high levels of glycine, and low levels of isoleucine and lysine. The high levels of cysteine residues contributes to the numerous disulfide bonds found in the mature protein's folded structure. Overall, MEGF8 has a pH between 6.4 and 7.0, depending on the organism's sequence. Human MEGF8's pH is 6.4. This nearly neutral pH enables the protein to fold properly and inhibits denaturation. The twenty most conserved amino acids, found through a multiple sequence alignment of 20 orthologs, were found to be located in the CUB and transmembrane domains.

=== Secondary Structure ===
Prediction software PELE from UCSC Biology Workbench indicated that MEGF8 is primarily composed of beta-folded sheets, with occasional short alpha helix segments. PELE uses eight different prediction programs to compare and confirm predictions, enhancing the confidence level. The beta-folded sheets occur at many of the key domains, including the EGF-domains, kelch domains, and EGF-laminin domains. This information from PELE also corresponded with the secondary structure and 3D structure predictions made by PHYRE2

=== Predicted Key Domains & Features ===
MEGF8 is predicted to contain several different types of features, domains, and motifs that play a key role in the protein's function, structure, and location. These are listed in Table 1. Functions, found through SMART analysis, as well as NCBI Conserved Domains Search include:

- CUB domain: extracellular domain: present in proteins mostly known to be involved in development.
- Epidermal Growth Factor Domain: a short peptide with a distinctive motif of six cysteines, which is found in many different proteins of diverse functions
- EGF-like domain: contains several sub-families of different functions according to location and protein; not specified for MEGF8.
- Calcium EGF-like domain: Calcium-binding EGF-like domain, present in a large number of membrane-bound and extracellular (mostly animal) proteins. Many of these proteins require calcium for their biological function and calcium-binding sites have been found to be located at the N-terminus of particular EGF-like domains.
- Kelch motif: Galactose oxidase, central domain; Found to cause formation of ß propeller tertiary structure of the protein.
- Leucine Zipper: A motif found in regulatory proteins, as predicted by PSORT II
- Laminin EGF-like domain: laminins are the major noncollagenous components of basement membranes that mediate cell adhesion, growth migration, and differentiation; the laminin-type epidermal growth factor-like module occurs in tandem arrays; the domain contains 4 disulfide bonds (loops a-d) the first three resemble epidermal growth factor (EGF).
- PSI domain: domain found in plexins, semaphorins and integrins. Plexin are involved in the development of neural and epithelial tissues; semaphorins induce the collapse and paralysis of neuronal growth cones; and integrins may mediate adhesive or migratory functions of epithelial cells.

==== Predicted Domain & Motif Locations ====
Table 2: Predicted Key Features, Domains, & Motifs Found in MEGF8 Human Protein Found through the use of Simple Modular Architecture Research Tool for the Human MEGF8 Sequence, with the NCBI accession number BAA32469.2.
Feature, Domain, or Motif Name	Number in MEGF8	Amino Acid Location Range (1-2785)
Signal Peptide	1	1-34
CUB Domain	1	40-147
Epidermal Growth Factor (EGF) Domain	6	148-177; 180-210; 1057-1100; 2121-2160; 2162-2190; 2200-2240
D1k3ia Structural Domain	2	233-550; 1449-1801
Kelch Repeat	9	241-276; 340-388; 454-504; 519-575; 1450-1492; 1505-1552; 1724-1764; 1780-1820; 2239-2255
Leucine Zipper Pattern	1	1698-1719
PSI Domain	6	787-839; 889-931; 945-1013; 1864-1919; 2008-2058; 2060-2117
EGF_Ca Domain	1	1014-1055
EGF_Like Domain	4	1103-1148; 1346-1485; 2244-2317; 2320-2381
EGF_LAM Domain	1	1151-1199
Transmembrane Region	1	2588-2610

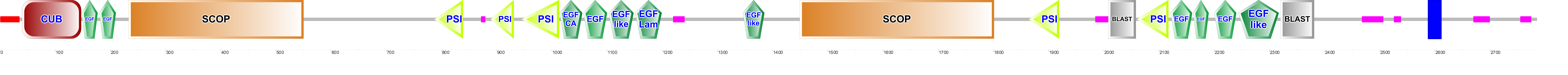
Scaled Map of MEGF8 Features along protein

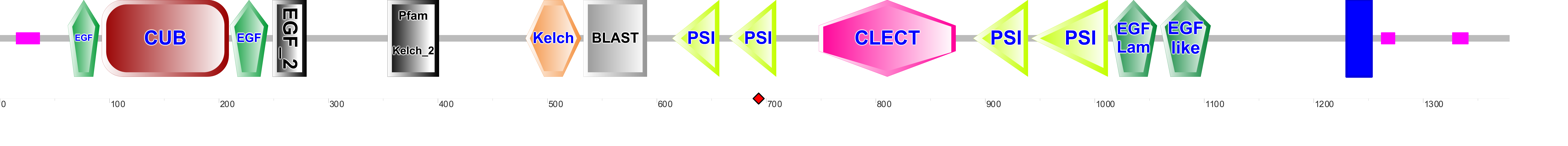
Human ATRNL1 (Paralog to MEGF8) Protein Feature Map

=== Tertiary Structure ===
One of the key attributes of MEGF8's tertiary structure is its 7-bladed beta propeller which is formed by the kelch motif found in its D1k3ia3 structural domain, which was identified by SCOP. SCOP also indicated that the beta-propeller in MEGF8 is a member of the galactose oxidase super family. Each of the seven blades are made up of a four stranded beta-folded motifs. It is also important to note that although many phosphorylation sites are predicted at high confidence, several other topographic predictions (i.e. disulfide bonds, glycosylation, other extracellular features), do not support these predictions.

==== Predicted Post Translational Modifications ====
Table 3: Key Predicted Post Translational Modifications Found in MEGF8 Human Protein
Feature	Number Predicted in MEGF8	Amino Acid Location Range (1-2785)	Source
Cysteine involved in Disulfide Bond	99+ Possible Sites	-	DISULFIND & UniProt
SUMOylation	3 (confidently)	K886; K1681; K1737	SUMOplot
Phosphorylation	116	-	NetPhos
Internal Repeats	1	CQCNGH 1144-1149 & 2313-2318	SAPS
N-linked Glycosylation	20	56; 223; 267; 427; 699; 749; 968; 987; 1054; 1140; 1210; 1539; 1908; 1929; 2006; 2153; 2168; 2340; 2778	NetNGlyc
Signal Peptide Cleavage	1	between amino acids 34 and 35	SignalP
Hydrophobic Domain	1	2588-2610	SAPS
Extracellular Domain	1	1- 2587	Phobius
Transmembrane Region	1	2588-2610	Phobius, SAPS, SMART
Intracellular Domain	1	2611-2785	Phobius, SMART

== Expression ==
MEGF8 is found to be expressed at high levels in cardiac myocytes and fetal brain tissue, according to GeoProfiles, from NCBI. This GeoProfile also indicated that MEGF8 was found to be at moderate to moderately low expression levels in all other tissues examined. NCBI GeoProfile data also provided the tissue expression graph for MEGF8 in humans, which is displayed to the right, further illustrating specific sites and levels of expression

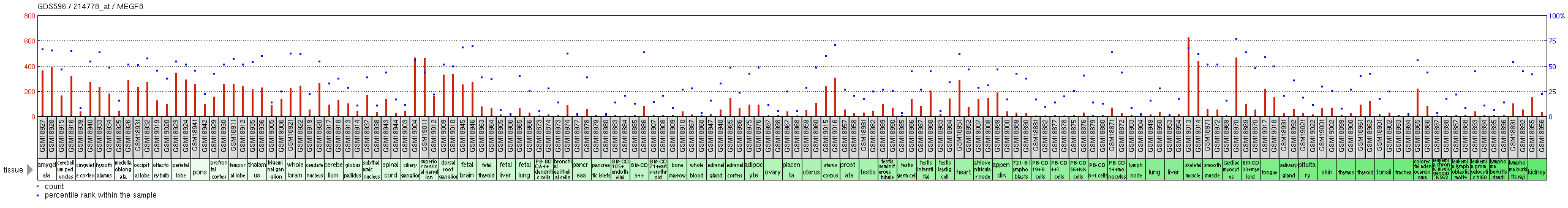
NCBI GeoProfile for MEGF8 Tissues Expression in Humans

=== Function and Mechanisms in Cellular Processes ===
==== Molecular Function ====
According to BioGPS gene ontology information, MEGF8 is an active participant in receptor activity, calcium ion binding, protein binding.

==== Role in Biological Processes ====
Analysis of gene ontology information by BioGPS was able to produce a list of biological processes in each of which MEGF8 plays a significant role:

- embryonic heart tube morphogenesis (GO:0003143)
- regulation of gene expression (GO:0010468)
- embryonic limb morphogenesis (GO:0030326)
- BMP signaling pathway (GO:0030509)
- limb morphogenesis (GO:0035108)
- cell migration involved in gastrulation (GO:0042074)
- embryonic skeletal system morphogenesis (GO:0048704)
- positive regulation of axon extension involved in axon guidance (GO:0048842)
- epiboly involved in gastrulation with mouth forming second (GO:0055113)
- embryonic heart tube left/right pattern formation (GO:0060971)
- left/right pattern formation (GO:0060972)
- determination of heart left/right asymmetry (GO:0061371)
- determination of digestive tract left/right asymmetry (GO:0071907)
- craniofacial suture morphogenesis (GO:0097094)
- fasciculation of sensory neuron axon (GO:0097155)

==== Putative Interactions ====
In the table below, all predicted interactions, except SMARCD3, are supported by two-hybrid screen experimental data. This information is supported by both NextProt database and IntAct database. The two interactions with the highest confidence value are also supported by materials found by text-mining in STRING. Together, it is with reasonably high confidence that the proteins in red are interacting with MEGF8, and with moderate confidence that the proteins in green interact with MEGF8. The confidence level for the proteins in blue is much lower, which may mean that the two-hybrid assay provided a false positive, or that they actually are interacting.

Table 4: Putative Protein Interactions with Human MEGF8
Predicted Interacting Protein	Confidence	Location	Description	Experimental/Text Support	Function	Source
GFI1B	Conf:0.866	Found in Endothelial & Erythroid	GFI1B is a growth factor independent 1B transcription repressor	Two-Hybrid (IntAct) Text-mining (STRING/OMIM)	Essential proto-oncogenic transcriptional regulator; Transcriptional repressor or activator depending on both promoter and cell type context; represses promoter activity of SOCS1 and SOCS3 and thus, may regulate cytokine signaling pathways.	IntAct, STRING, NextProt
ATN1	Conf: 0.538	Everywhere	Atrophin 1 (ATN1)	Two Hybrid Assay	Transcriptional corepressor. Recruits NR2E1 to repress transcription. Promotes vascular smooth cell (VSMC) migration and orientation	IntAct, STRING
ATXN7	Conf: 0.510	Mod-High Everywhere	Apinocerebellar ataxia type 7 protein (ATXN7)	Two Hybrid, Pull-Down	Acts as component of the STAGA transcription coactivator-HAT complex. Mediates the interaction of STAGA complex with the CRX and is involved in CRX-dependent gene activation. Necessary for microtubule cytoskeleton stabilization	Int Act, NextProt
CACNA1A	Conf: 0.510	Certain Brain Tissues	Calcium Channel, Voltage-Dependent, P/Q Type, Alpha 1A Subunit (Cav2.1)	Two Hybrid Assay, Pull-Down	Mediates the entry of calcium ions into excitable cells and are also involved in a variety of calcium-dependent processes, including muscle contraction, hormone or neurotransmitter release, gene expression, cell motility, cell division and cell death.	IntAct, NextProt
SMARCD3	Conf: 0.778	High Everywhere	SWI/SNF related, matrix associated, actin dependent regulator of chromatin, subfamily d, member (SMARCD3)	Text-mining (OMIM article for SMARCS3)	Plays a role in ATP dependent nucleosome remodeling by SMARCA4 containing complexes. Stimulates nuclear receptor mediated transcription	STRING
FIHB1	Conf: 0.370			Two Hybrid Pooling	Uncharacterized	IntAct, NextProt
Y3542	Conf: 0.370		(Q8CKF8 in UniProtKB)	Two Hybrid Pooling	Uncharacterized	IntAct, NextProt
ProW	Conf: 0.370			Two Hybrid Pooling	Uncharacterized	IntAct, NextProt

== Alternative Splicing, Mutations, & Phenotypic Impacts ==
=== Splice Variants ===
The four primary splice variants and their distinctions are described below (labels correspond to those in image below):

A: has spliced out Exon 13. Looking at the attached working conceptual translation, it can be seen that exon 3 does not code for any feature, domain, motif or other functional section of aa, and is likely therefore not key to the function of MEGF8 protein. This is the variant that corresponds to the splice model of the analyzed megf8.

B: Spliced out exons 1-6; these exons hold several key domains and motifs including the CUB domain, two PSI domains, a D1k3ia3 structural domain, and a kelch repeat. This may result in a misfolded protein without the structural segments, and inhibit participation in development events (loss of PSI and CUB). Still has signal and TMEM so may still be able to partially function

C: part of the D1k3ia3 structural domain remains in exon 29, but the kelch repeat has been excised, which could lead to structural issues. Also this variant contains almost 3 PSI domains, and an area of low complexity in exons 32-35, which may allow this variant to function in the cell, but no signal or TMEM to place in membrane so not a normal function

D: This variant is exons 36-40, excised 41, and a shortened 42 exon. It possesses EGF calcium domains and EGF/EGF-like domains. Loss of 41 will drastically alter the function as it possesses the TMEM segment. It depends on where 41 is lost and 42 is cleaved.

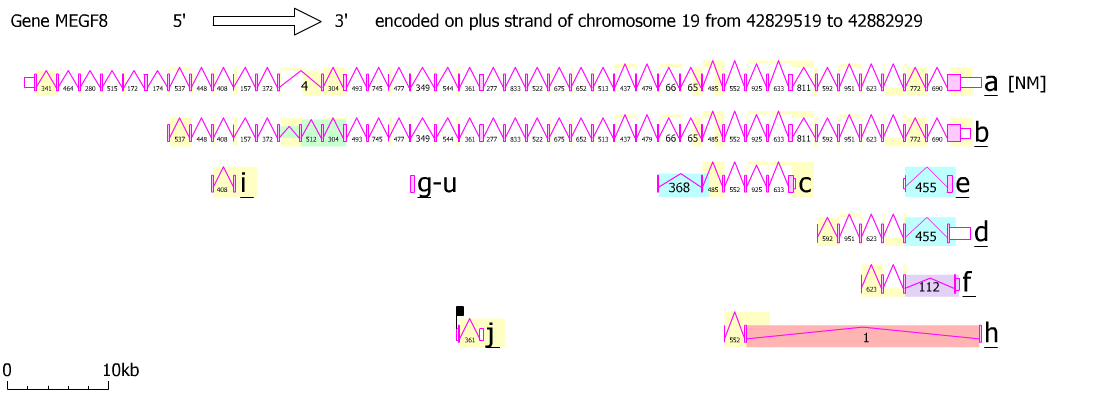
This diagram from AceView depicts the various forms of MEGF8 produced by alternative splicing

=== Common Mutations ===
==== SNPs ====
There are several SNPs, found through NCBI GeneView, that cause missense or silent mutations in MEGF8. However, three SNP mutations were identified as causes of Carpenter Syndrome 2 by Twigg et al. The three SNP mutations are: Gly199 to Arg; Arg1499 to His; Ser2367 to Gly. The article by Twigg includes a supplementary data set that shows a multiple sequence alignment of the regions surrounding the SNPs and the domain in which the SNP lies. The Gly199 to Arg mutation is located inside an EGF-domain; the Arg1499 to His mutation is located within a kelch domain in the 7-bladed beta-sheet propeller; the Ser2367 to Gly is located within an EGF-Laminin domain. These domain are important to maintaining a properly folded protein and its function.

==== Carpenter Syndrome 2 ====
Visit Carpenter syndrome for more extensive details related to the disease. Genetic mutations in MEGF8 have been found to be a principal cause of this rare genetic syndrome.

==== Adverse Phenotypic Consequences ====
Mutations in MEGF8 have been found to be linked to defective lateralization during development, as reported by Twigg et al. Common features of individuals with Carpenter Syndrome Subtype II include the following:

- Tower-shaped skull (craniosynostosis)
- Intellectual disability
- Polysyndactyly digits
- High birth weight
- Obesity in later life *congenital heart disease
- Umbilical hernia
- Cryptorchidism in males
- Genu valgum ("knock-knee")

=== Current Research ===
There is no research being done currently to develop treatment or cures for Carpenter Syndrome 2. Researchers are still striving to understand the cause of the point mutations in MEGF8 that result in this extremely rare genetic disease.
