= Factor in the germline alpha =

Protein found in humans

FIGLA

Identifiers
- Aliases: FIGLA, BHLHC8, FIGALPHA, POF6, folliculogenesis specific bHLH transcription factor
- External IDs: OMIM: 608697; MGI: 1349421; GeneCards: FIGLA

Gene location (Human)
Chr.	Chromosome 2 (human)
Band	2p13.3	Start	70,777,310 bp
Band	2p13.3	End	70,790,643 bp

Gene location (Mouse)
Chr.	Chromosome 6 (mouse)
Band	6|6 C3	Start	85,993,153 bp
Band	6|6 C3	End	85,997,978 bp
RNA expression pattern
Bgee	Human / Mouse (ortholog); Top expressed in: oocyte; secondary oocyte; testicle; gonad; body of pancreas; gastric mucosa; myometrium; abdominal wall; body of uterus; right ovary / Top expressed in: primary oocyte; embryo; ovarian follicle cell; secondary oocyte; secondary follicle of ovary; zygote; lens; primary follicle of ovary; spermatid; spermatocyte; More reference expression data
BioGPS	n/a
Gene ontology
Molecular function	RNA polymerase II cis-regulatory region sequence-specific DNA binding; sequence-specific DNA binding; DNA binding; DNA-binding transcription activator activity, RNA polymerase II-specific; transcription factor binding; protein dimerization activity; DNA-binding transcription factor activity, RNA polymerase II-specific
Cellular component	nucleus; transcription regulator complex
Biological process	multicellular organism development; cell differentiation; regulation of transcription, DNA-templated; transcription by RNA polymerase II; transcription, DNA-templated; positive regulation of transcription by RNA polymerase II; oocyte development; oogenesis
Sources:Amigo / QuickGO
Orthologs
Databases	NCBI: entry; OMA: entry
Species	Human	Mouse
Entrez	344018	26910
Ensembl	ENSG00000183733	ENSMUSG00000030001
UniProt	Q6QHK4	O55208
RefSeq (mRNA)	NM_001004311	NM_012013
RefSeq (protein)	NP_001004311	NP_036143
Location (UCSC)	Chr 2: 70.78 – 70.79 Mb	Chr 6: 85.99 – 86 Mb
PubMed search
- Wikidata
View/Edit Human	View/Edit Mouse

Factor in the germline alpha (FIGalpha), folliculogenesis-specific basic helix-loop-helix or transcription factor FIGa, is a protein that in humans is encoded by the FIGLA gene. The FIGLA gene is a germ cell-specific transcription factor preferentially expressed in oocytes that can be found on human chromosome 2 p13.3.

== Function ==
FIGLA encodes a protein that functions in postnatal oocyte-specific gene expression. The protein is a basic helix–loop–helix transcription factor that regulates multiple oocyte-specific genes, including genes involved in folliculogenesis, oocyte differentiation, and those that encode the zona pellucida. FIGLA is related to the zona pellucida genes ZP1, ZP2, and ZP3.

== Clinical significance ==
Mutations in the FIGLA gene are associated with premature ovarian failure. Premature ovarian failure is a genetic disorder that leads to hypergonadotropic ovarian failure and infertility. It is believed that premature ovarian failure in humans is caused by FIGLA haploninsuffciency, which disrupts the formation of the primordial follicles. This was observed in FIGLA mice knockouts which had diminished follicular endowment and accelerated oocyte loss throughout their reproductive life span. Women with mutations in their FIGLA were shown to have a form of premature ovarian failure. As well as the failure to form primordial follicles, knockout mice also lacked zona pellucida genes Zp1, Zp2, and ZP3 expression.
