= Forkhead box protein L2 =

Transcription factor gene of the FOX family

FOXL2

Identifiers
- Aliases: FOXL2, BPES, BPES1, PFRK, PINTO, POF3, forkhead box L2
- External IDs: OMIM: 605597; MGI: 1349428; GeneCards: FOXL2

Gene location (Human)
Chr.	Chromosome 3 (human)
Band	3q22.3	Start	138,944,224 bp
Band	3q22.3	End	138,947,137 bp

Gene location (Mouse)
Chr.	Chromosome 9 (mouse)
Band	9|9 E3.3	Start	98,837,341 bp
Band	9|9 E3.3	End	98,840,596 bp
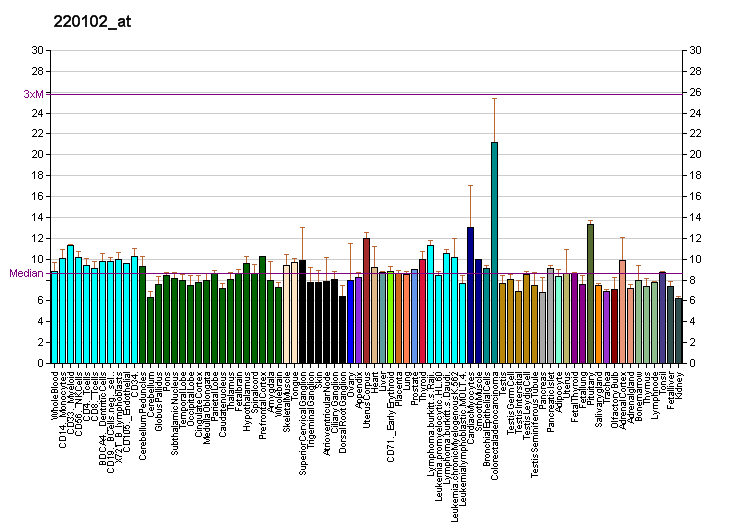
RNA expression pattern
Bgee	Human / Mouse (ortholog); Top expressed in: left ovary; stromal cell of endometrium; right ovary; gonad; canal of the cervix; decidua; testicle; left uterine tube; pituitary gland; right uterine tube / Top expressed in: membrana granulosa of ovarian follicle; cumulus cell; ovarian follicle cell; Stroma of ovary; gastrula; eyelid; urethra; male urethra; cervix; Cumulus oophorus; More reference expression data
BioGPS	More reference expression data
Gene ontology
Molecular function	DNA binding; sequence-specific DNA binding; DNA-binding transcription factor activity; DNA-binding transcription activator activity, RNA polymerase II-specific; cysteine-type endopeptidase regulator activity involved in apoptotic process; RNA polymerase II cis-regulatory region sequence-specific DNA binding; protein binding; estrogen receptor binding; ubiquitin conjugating enzyme binding; DNA-binding transcription factor activity, RNA polymerase II-specific
Cellular component	nucleus; intercellular bridge; nucleoplasm
Biological process	oocyte growth; apoptotic DNA fragmentation; regulation of transcription, DNA-templated; extraocular skeletal muscle development; embryonic eye morphogenesis; positive regulation of follicle-stimulating hormone secretion; negative regulation of transcription by RNA polymerase II; transcription by RNA polymerase II; transcription, DNA-templated; female gonad development; single fertilization; uterus development; positive regulation of transcription, DNA-templated; positive regulation of cysteine-type endopeptidase activity involved in apoptotic process; positive regulation of apoptotic process; ovarian follicle development; negative regulation of transcription, DNA-templated; female somatic sex determination; granulosa cell differentiation; positive regulation of luteinizing hormone secretion; positive regulation of transcription by RNA polymerase II; anatomical structure morphogenesis; cell differentiation; regulation of transcription by RNA polymerase II
Sources:Amigo / QuickGO
Orthologs
Databases	NCBI: entry; OMA: entry
Species	Human	Mouse
Entrez	668	26927
Ensembl	ENSG00000183770	ENSMUSG00000050397
UniProt	P58012	O88470
RefSeq (mRNA)	NM_023067	NM_012020
RefSeq (protein)	NP_075555	NP_036150
Location (UCSC)	Chr 3: 138.94 – 138.95 Mb	Chr 9: 98.84 – 98.84 Mb
PubMed search
- Wikidata
View/Edit Human	View/Edit Mouse

Forkhead box protein L2 is a protein that in humans is encoded by the FOXL2 gene.

== Function ==
FOXL2 (OMIM 605597) is a transcription factor belonging to the forkhead box (FOX) superfamily, characterized by the forkhead box/winged-helix DNA-binding domain. FOXL2 plays an important role in ovarian development and function. In postnatal ovaries FOXL2 regulates granulosa cell differentiation and supports the growth of the pre-ovulatory follicles during adult life. In addition, the FOXL2 protein will prevent the formation of testes by suppressing expression of SOX9. In mice, FOXL2 is also expressed in pituitary cells where it is required for FSH expression.

== Regulation ==
FOXL2 has several post-translational modifications that modulate its stability, subcellular localization and pro-apoptotic activity. By a yeast-two-hybrid screening, 10 novel protein partners of FOXL2 were discovered. The interactions were confirmed by co-immunoprecipitation experiments between FOXL2 and CXXC4 (IDAX), CXXC5 (RINF/WID), CREM, GMEB1 (P96PIF), NR2C1 (TR2), SP100, RPLP1, BAF (BANF1), XRCC6 (KU70) and SIRT1.

== Clinical significance ==
=== Sex determination ===
FOXL2 is involved in sex determination. FOXL2 knockout in mature mouse ovaries appears to cause the ovary's somatic cells to transdifferentiate to the equivalent cell types ordinarily found in the testes. Polled Intersex Syndrome in goats is caused by a biallelic loss-of-function in FOXL2 transcription and leads to in utero female-to-male sex-reversal.

=== Eyebrow thickness ===
Several SNPs (Single Variant Polymorphisms) in the genomic region 3q23 overlapping the forkhead box L2 (FOXL2) were found associated with eyebrow thickness. In Europeans, East Asians, and South Asians, the derived allele is above ~90% frequency, and in Africans, it is above ~75%. Native Americans, particularly Peruvians, have a relatively high frequency of the homozygous ancestral allele, which significantly decreases eyebrow thickness. All primates and archaic humans share the ancestral allele.

=== Blepharophimosis–ptosis–epicanthus inversus syndrome ===
Mutations in this gene are a cause of blepharophimosis, ptosis, epicanthus inversus syndrome and/or premature ovarian failure (POF) 3. Predicting the occurrence of POF based on the nature of the missense mutations in FOXL2 was a medical challenge. However, a correlation between the transcriptional activity of FOXL2 variants and the type of BPES was found. Moreover, by studying the effects of natural and artificial mutations in the forkhead domain of FOXL2, a clear correlation between the orientation of amino-acid side chains in the DNA-binding domain and transcriptional activity is founded, providing the first (in silico) predictive tool of the effects of FOXL2 missense mutations.

=== Adult granulosa cell tumors ===
A missense mutation in the FOXL2 gene, C134W, is typically found in adult granulosa cell tumors but not in other ovarian cancers nor in juvenile granulosa cell tumors.

=== Endometriosis ===
In addition to ovarian expression of FOXL2, there have been recent studies to suggest that overexpression of FOXL2 has been implicated in endometriosis in addition to activin A.

=== Other deregulations ===
One study has found that FOXL2 is required for SF-1-induced ovarian AMH regulation by interactions between FOXL2 protein and SF-1; a mutated FOXL2 could not interact with SF-1 normally and thus could not regulate ovarian AMH as normal.

In a knockout study in mice, the granulosa cells of the ovaries failed to undergo the squamous-to-cuboidal transition, which led to the arrest of folliculogenesis.

== See also ==
- FOX proteins
