= Growth differentiation factor 9 =

Protein-coding gene in the species Homo sapiens

GDF9

Identifiers
- Aliases: GDF9, entrez:2661, growth differentiation factor 9, POF14
- External IDs: OMIM: 601918; MGI: 95692; GeneCards: GDF9

Gene location (Human)
Chr.	Chromosome 5 (human)
Band	5q31.1	Start	132,861,181 bp
Band	5q31.1	End	132,866,884 bp

Gene location (Mouse)
Chr.	Chromosome 11 (mouse)
Band	11 B1.3|11 31.94 cM	Start	53,321,850 bp
Band	11 B1.3|11 31.94 cM	End	53,328,731 bp
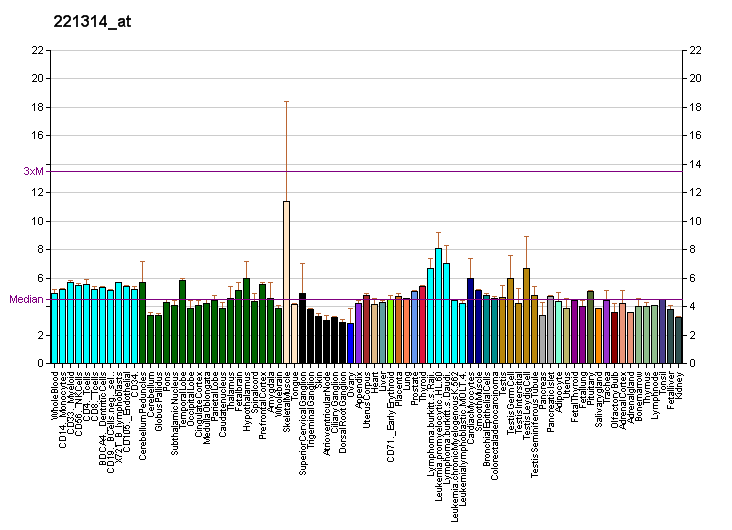
RNA expression pattern
Bgee	Human / Mouse (ortholog); Top expressed in: oocyte; secondary oocyte; testicle; gonad; right testis; left testis; right uterine tube; ganglionic eminence; tibialis anterior muscle; islet of Langerhans / Top expressed in: secondary oocyte; primary oocyte; zygote; egg cell; embryo; tibiofemoral joint; embryo; morula; morula; right ventricle; More reference expression data
BioGPS	More reference expression data
Gene ontology
Molecular function	transforming growth factor beta receptor binding; cytokine activity; growth factor activity
Cellular component	cytoplasm; extracellular region; extracellular space
Biological process	regulation of apoptotic process; positive regulation of pathway-restricted SMAD protein phosphorylation; oocyte growth; regulation of MAPK cascade; transforming growth factor beta receptor signaling pathway; SMAD protein signal transduction; female gamete generation; negative regulation of cell growth; BMP signaling pathway; cell development; positive regulation of cell population proliferation; regulation of progesterone secretion; regulation of signaling receptor activity
Sources:Amigo / QuickGO
Orthologs
Databases	NCBI: entry; OMA: entry
Species	Human	Mouse
Entrez	2661	14566
Ensembl	ENSG00000164404	ENSMUSG00000018238
UniProt	O60383	Q07105
RefSeq (mRNA)	NM_001288824; NM_001288825; NM_001288826; NM_001288827; NM_001288828 NM_005260	NM_008110
RefSeq (protein)	NP_001275753; NP_001275754; NP_001275755; NP_001275756; NP_001275757 NP_005251	NP_032136
Location (UCSC)	Chr 5: 132.86 – 132.87 Mb	Chr 11: 53.32 – 53.33 Mb
PubMed search
- Wikidata
View/Edit Human	View/Edit Mouse

Growth/differentiation factor 9 (GDF-9) is a protein that in humans is encoded by the GDF9 gene.

Growth factors synthesized by ovarian somatic cells (granulosa cells) directly affect oocyte growth and function. Growth differentiation factor 9 (GDF-9) is expressed in oocytes and is thought to be required for ovarian folliculogenesis. GDF9 is a member of the transforming growth factor beta (TGF-β) superfamily.

Growth differentiation factor 9 (GDF-9) is an oocyte derived growth factor in the transforming growth factor β (TGF-β) superfamily. It is highly expressed in the oocyte and has a pivotal influence on the surrounding somatic cells, particularly granulosa, cumulus and theca cells. Paracrine interactions between the developing oocyte and its surrounding follicular cells is essential for the correct progression of both the follicle and the oocyte. GDF9 is essential for the overall process of folliculogenesis, oogenesis and ovulation and thus plays a major role in female fertility.

== Function ==
=== Signaling pathway ===
GDF9 acts through two receptors on the cells surrounding the oocyte, it binds to bone morphogenic protein receptor 2 (BMPRII) and downstream to this utilizes the TGF-β receptor type 1 (ALK5). Ligand receptor activation allows the downstream phosphorylation and activation of SMAD proteins. SMAD proteins are transcription factors found in vertebrates, insects and nematodes, and are the intercellular substrates of all TGF-β molecules. GDF9 specifically activates SMAD2 and SMAD3 which form a complex with SMAD4, a common partner of all SMAD proteins, that is then able to translocate to the nucleus to regulate gene expression.

=== Role in folliculogenesis ===
==== Early follicle development ====
In many mammalian species GDF9 is essential for early follicular development through its direct action on the granulosa cells allowing proliferation and differentiation The deletion of GDF9 results in decreased ovary size, halted follicular development at the stage of the primary follicle and the absence of any corpus lutea. The proliferative ability of granulosa cells is significantly reduced whereby no more than a single layer of granulosa cells is able to surround and thus support the developing oocyte. Any somatic cell formation after the primary layer is atypical and asymmetrical. Normally the follicle becomes atretic and degenerates although this does not occur emphasizing the abnormality of these supporting cells. GDF9 deficiency is further linked with the up regulation of inhibin. The normal expression of GDF9 allows the downregulation of inhibin a and thus promotes the ability of the follicle to progress past the primary stage of development.

In vitro exposure of mammalian ovarian tissue to GDF9 promotes primary follicle progression. GDF9 stimulates growth of preantral follicles by preventing granulosa cell apoptosis. This may occur through increased follicle stimulating hormone (FSH) receptor expression or be a result of post-receptor signaling.

Some sheep breeds show a range of fertility phenotypes due to eight single nucleotide polymorphisms (SNP) across the coding region of GDF9. A SNP in the Gdf9 gene resulting in a non conservative amino acid change was identified, whereby ewes homozygous for the SNP were infertile and completely lacked any follicle growth.

==== Late follicle development ====
Typical of later stages of follicle development is the appearance of cumulus cells. GDF9 causes the expansion of cumulus cells, a characteristic process in normal follicular development. GDF9 induces hyaluronanic synthase 2 (Has2) and suppresses urokinase plasminogen activator (uPA) mRNA synthesis in granulosa cells. This allows an extracellular matrix rich in hyaluronic acid, allowing the expansion of cumulus cells. Silencing of GDF9 expression results in the absence of cumulus cell expansion, this highlights the integral role of GDF9 signaling in altering granulosa cell enzymes and therefore allowing cumulus cell expansion in late stages of folliculogenesis.

=== Role in oogenesis and ovulation ===
==== Role in oogenesis ====
A lack of GDF9 causes pathophysiological alterations in the oocyte itself in addition to severe follicular abnormality; oocytes reach normal size and form a zona pellucida although organelles become clustered and cortical granules do not form. In GDF9 deficient oocytes the meiotic ability is significantly altered, where less than half will proceed metaphase 1 or 2 and a large percentage of oocytes have abnormal germinal vesicle breakdown. As cumulus cells surround the oocyte during development and remain with the oocyte once it is ovulated, GDF9 expression in cumulus cells is important in allowing an ideal oocyte microenvironment. The altered phenotype observed in GDF9 deficient oocytes likely results from the lack off somatic cell input in later stages of folliculogenesis.

==== Role in ovulation ====
GDF9 is required just prior to the surge of luteinizing hormone (LH), a key event responsible for ovulation. Prior to the LH surge, GDF9 supports the metabolic function of cumulus cells, allowing glycolysis and cholesterol biosynthesis. Cholesterol is a precursor of many essential steroid hormones such as progesterone. Progesterone levels rise significantly post ovulation to support the early stages of embryogenesis. In preovulatory follicles, GDF9 promotes the production of progesterone via the stimulation of the prostaglandin- EP2 receptor signaling pathway.

=== Synergistic interaction ===
Bone morphogenetic protein 15 (BMP15) is highly expressed in the oocyte and the surrounding follicular cells contributing greatly to folliculogenesis and oogenesis. Like GDF9, BMP15 belongs to the TGF-β superfamily. Differences in the synergistic action of BMP15 and GDF9 appear to be species dependent. BMP15 and GDF9 act in an additive manner to increase mitotic proliferation in sheep granulosa cells, although the same effect is not observed in bovine granulosa cells. The silencing of ‘’Bmp15’’ in mice results in partial fertility but normal histological appearance of the ovary. Although, when this is combined with the silencing of one allele of ‘’Gdf9’’, mice are completely infertile due to insufficient folliculogenesis and altered cumulus cell morphology. Mice with this genome also fail to release oocytes resulting in trapped oocytes in the corpus lutea. This phenotype is absent in ‘’Gdf9’’ silenced mice and only present a small population of ‘’Bmp15’’ silenced mice. This reveals the synergistic relationship of GDF9 and BMP15 whereby the silencing of both genes results in more severe outcome then either of the genes alone. It is thought that any co operative effects of GDF9 and BMP15 are modulated through the BMPRII receptor.

GDF9 plays an important role in the development of primary follicles in the ovary. It has a critical role in granulosa cell and theca cell growth, as well as in differentiation and maturation of the oocyte.

GDF9 has been connected to differences in ovulation rate and in premature cessation of ovary function, therefore has a significant role in fertility.

The cell surface receptor through which GDF9 generates a signal is the bone morphogenetic protein type II receptor (BMPR2).

== Clinical significance ==
=== Mutations in GDF9 ===
GDF9 mutations are present in women with premature ovarian failure, in addition to mothers of dizygotic twins. Three particular missense mutations GDF9 ^{P103S}, GDF9 ^{P374L} and GDF9^{R454C} have been found, although GDF9 ^{P103S} is present in women with dizygotic twins as well as women with premature ovarian failure. Given the same mutation is linked with a poly ovulatory phenotype and the failure of ovulation, these mutations are thought to alter the rate of ovulation, rather than specifically increasing or decreasing the rate. Most of these mutations are located in the pro-region of the gene that encodes GDF9, an area essential for the dimerization and hence activation of the encoded protein.

=== Link with polyendocrine metabolic ovarian syndrome (PMOS) ===
Polyendocrine metabolic ovarian syndrome (PMOS) accounts for approximately 90% of anovulation infertility, affecting 5-10% of woman of reproductive age. In women with PMOS, GDF9 mRNA is decreased in all stages of follicular development compared to women without PMOS. In particular, levels of GDF9 increase as the follicle develops from primordial stages to more mature stages. Women with PMOS have considerably lower expression of GDF9 in primordial, primary and secondary stages of folliculogenesis. GDF9 expression is not only reduced in women with PMOS but also delayed. Despite these facts the exact link of GDF9 with PMOS is not well established.
