= DMRT1 =

Protein-coding gene in humans

Identifiers
- Aliases: DMRT1, CT154, DMT1, doublesex and mab-3 related transcription factor 1
- External IDs: OMIM: 602424; MGI: 1354733; GeneCards: DMRT1
Available structures
PDB	Ortholog search: PDBe RCSB
PDB	List of PDB id codes 4YJ0

Gene location (Human)
Chr.	Chromosome 9 (human)
Band	9p24.3	Start	841,690 bp
Band	9p24.3	End	969,090 bp

Gene location (Mouse)
Chr.	Chromosome 19 (mouse)
Band	19|19 B	Start	25,482,982 bp
Band	19|19 B	End	25,581,693 bp
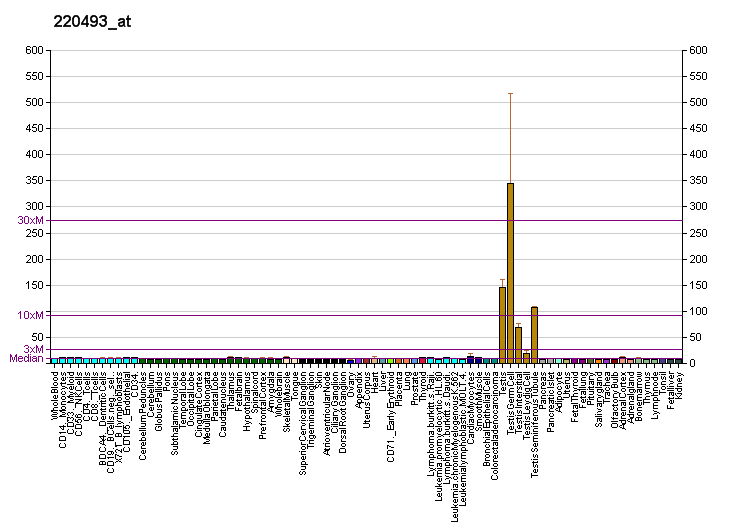
RNA expression pattern
Bgee	Human / Mouse (ortholog); Top expressed in: gonad; testicle; buccal mucosa cell; right testis; left testis; olfactory zone of nasal mucosa; germ cell; male germ cell; placenta; thyroid gland / Top expressed in: Gonadal ridge; seminiferous tubule; epithelium of seminiferous tubule of testis; Sertoli cell; spermatogonium; spermatid; morula; morula; embryo; spermatocyte; More reference expression data
BioGPS	More reference expression data
Gene ontology
Molecular function	DNA binding; sequence-specific DNA binding; RNA polymerase II transcription regulatory region sequence-specific DNA binding; DNA-binding transcription activator activity, RNA polymerase II-specific; chromatin binding; metal ion binding; protein heterodimerization activity; cis-regulatory region sequence-specific DNA binding; DNA-binding transcription factor activity; protein homodimerization activity; identical protein binding; DNA-binding transcription factor activity, RNA polymerase II-specific
Cellular component	cytoplasm; nucleus
Biological process	cell differentiation; intracellular signal transduction; male gonad development; regulation of transcription, DNA-templated; regulation of nodal signaling pathway; Sertoli cell differentiation; positive regulation of meiosis I; negative regulation of transcription by RNA polymerase II; transcription by RNA polymerase II; male sex determination; negative regulation of meiotic nuclear division; Sertoli cell development; oocyte development; transcription, DNA-templated; multicellular organism development; developmental process involved in reproduction; male germ cell proliferation; male sex differentiation; cell morphogenesis; spermatogenesis; positive regulation of mitotic nuclear division; positive regulation of male gonad development; germ cell migration; positive regulation of transcription by RNA polymerase II; sex differentiation
Sources:Amigo / QuickGO
Orthologs
Databases	NCBI: entry; OMA: entry
Species	Human	Mouse
Entrez	1761	50796
Ensembl	ENSG00000137090	ENSMUSG00000024837
UniProt	Q9Y5R6	Q9QZ59
RefSeq (mRNA)	NM_021951; NM_001363767	NM_015826
RefSeq (protein)	NP_068770; NP_001350696	NP_056641
Location (UCSC)	Chr 9: 0.84 – 0.97 Mb	Chr 19: 25.48 – 25.58 Mb
PubMed search
- Wikidata
View/Edit Human	View/Edit Mouse

Doublesex and mab-3 related transcription factor 1, also known as DMRT1, is a protein which in humans is encoded by the DMRT1 gene.

== Gene ==
In humans, the DMRT1 gene is located at the end of chromosome 9. This gene is found in a cluster with two other members of the gene family.

In birds, DMRT1 is located on the Z chromosome and male sexual development is determined by dosage of this gene.

== Structure ==
DMRT1 belongs to a gene family characterized by a zinc finger-like DNA-binding motif known as the DM domain. The DM domain is an ancient, conserved component of the vertebrate sex-determining pathway that is also a key regulator of male development in flies and nematodes, and is found to be the key sex-determining factor in birds.

The majority of DMRT1 protein is located in the testicular cord and Sertoli cells, with a small amount present in germ cells.

== Function ==
DMRT1 is a dose-sensitive transcription factor that regulates Sertoli cells and germ cells.

Two copies of the DMRT1 gene are required for normal sexual development. The gene is critical for male sex determination; in its absence, female developmental pathways predominate and male characteristics are reduced or absent.

When DMRT1 is knocked out in mice, changes occur in both Sertoli and germ cells soon after formation of the gonadal ridge. The principal defects associated with DMRT1 knockout include developmental arrest, excess proliferation of germ cells, and failure to undergo meiosis, mitosis, or migration. Thus, the knockout model shows that loss of DMRT1 is associated with incomplete germ cell development leading to infertility, abnormal testicular formation, and/or feminization of the affected individual.

Induced knockout of DMRT1 in adult male mice has been found to cause transdifferentiation of somatic cells in the testis to the equivalent cell types ordinarily found in the ovary.

Conversely, conditional expression of DMRT1 in the gonad of female mice caused apparent transdifferentiation of ovarian somatic (granulosa) cells to the equivalent male cell type (Sertoli).

== Clinical significance ==
Defective testicular development and XY feminization occur when this gene is hemizygous.

Loss of one copy of DMRT1 most commonly occurs in chromosome 9p deletion, which causes abnormal testicular formation and feminization.
