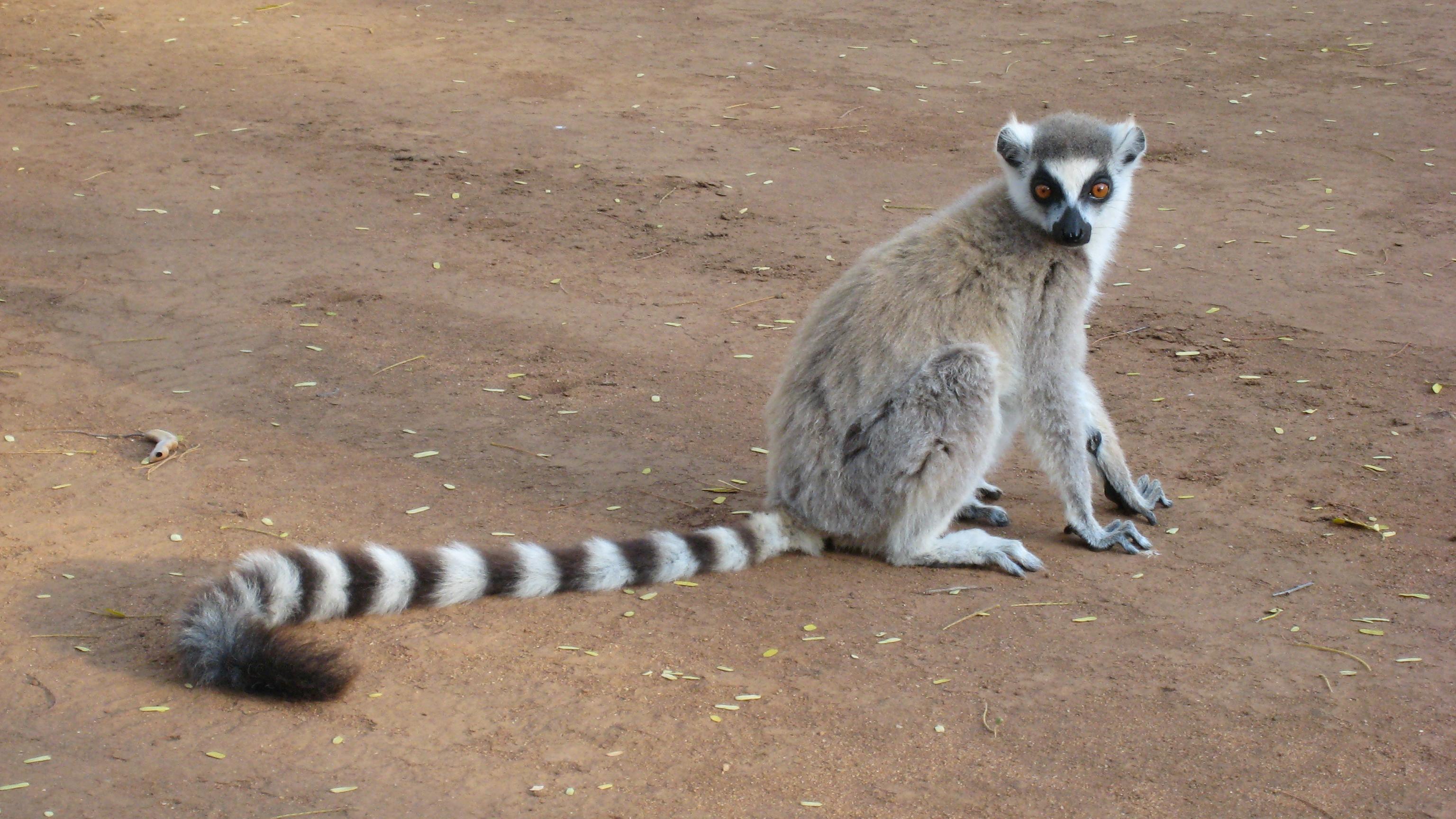
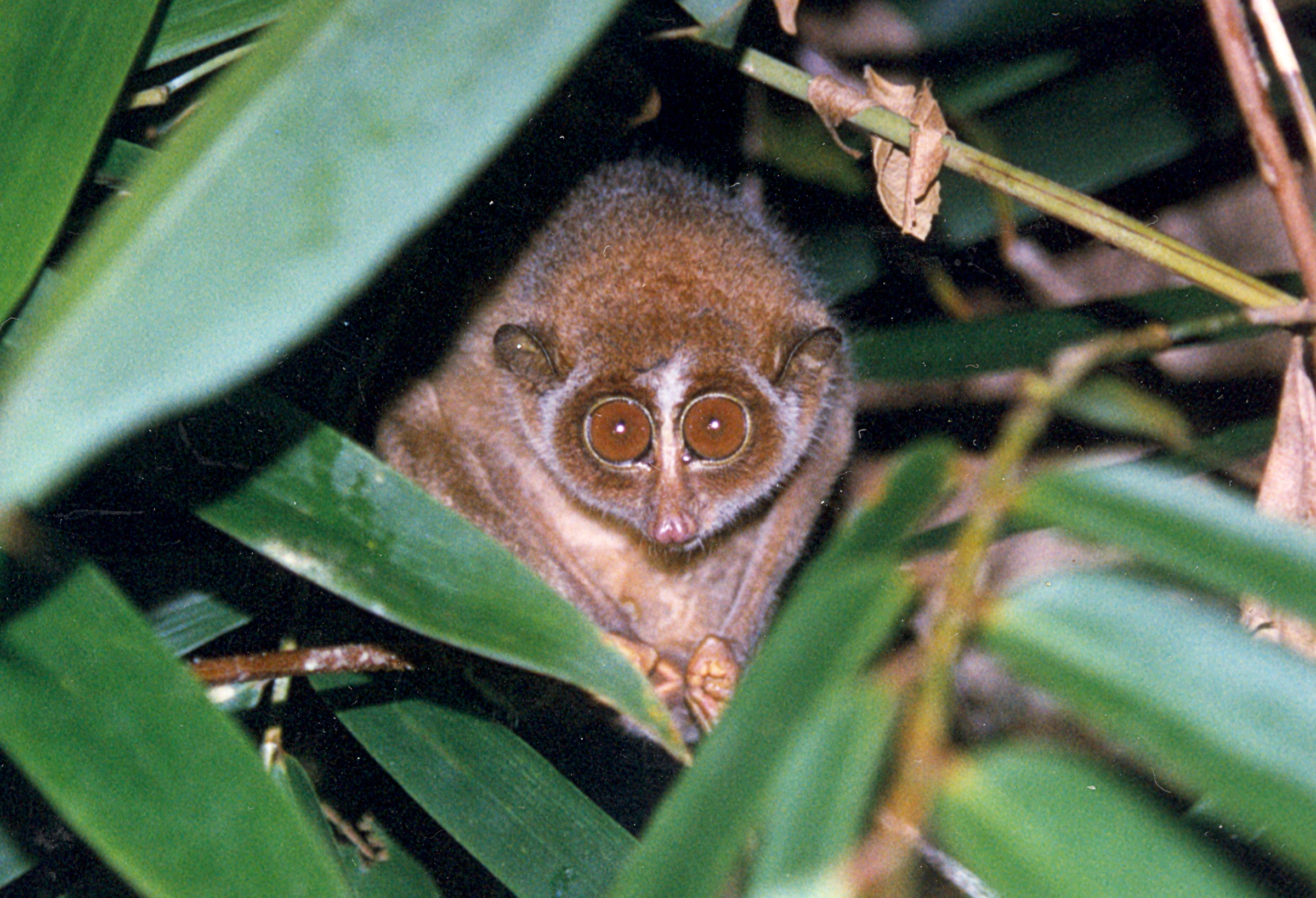
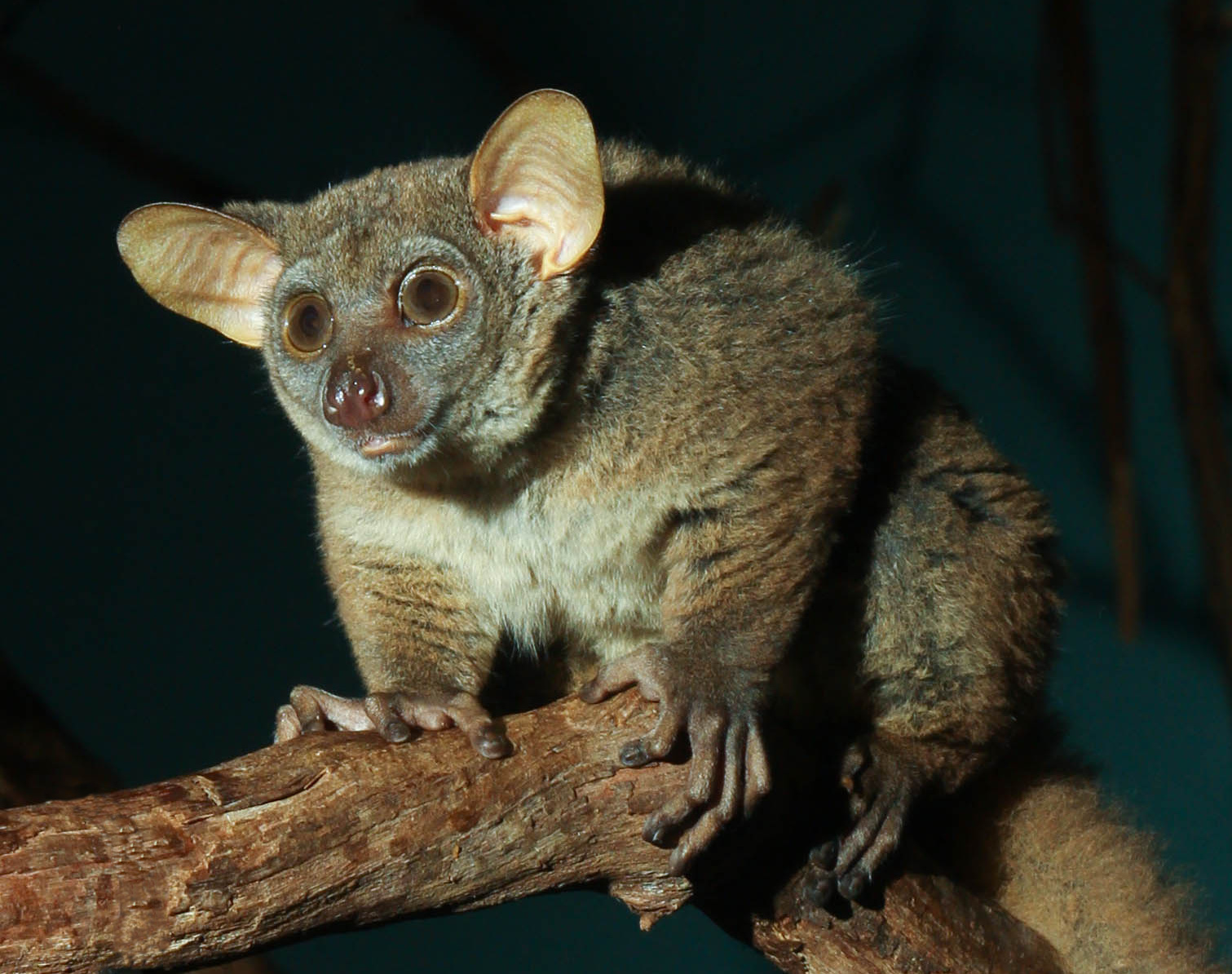
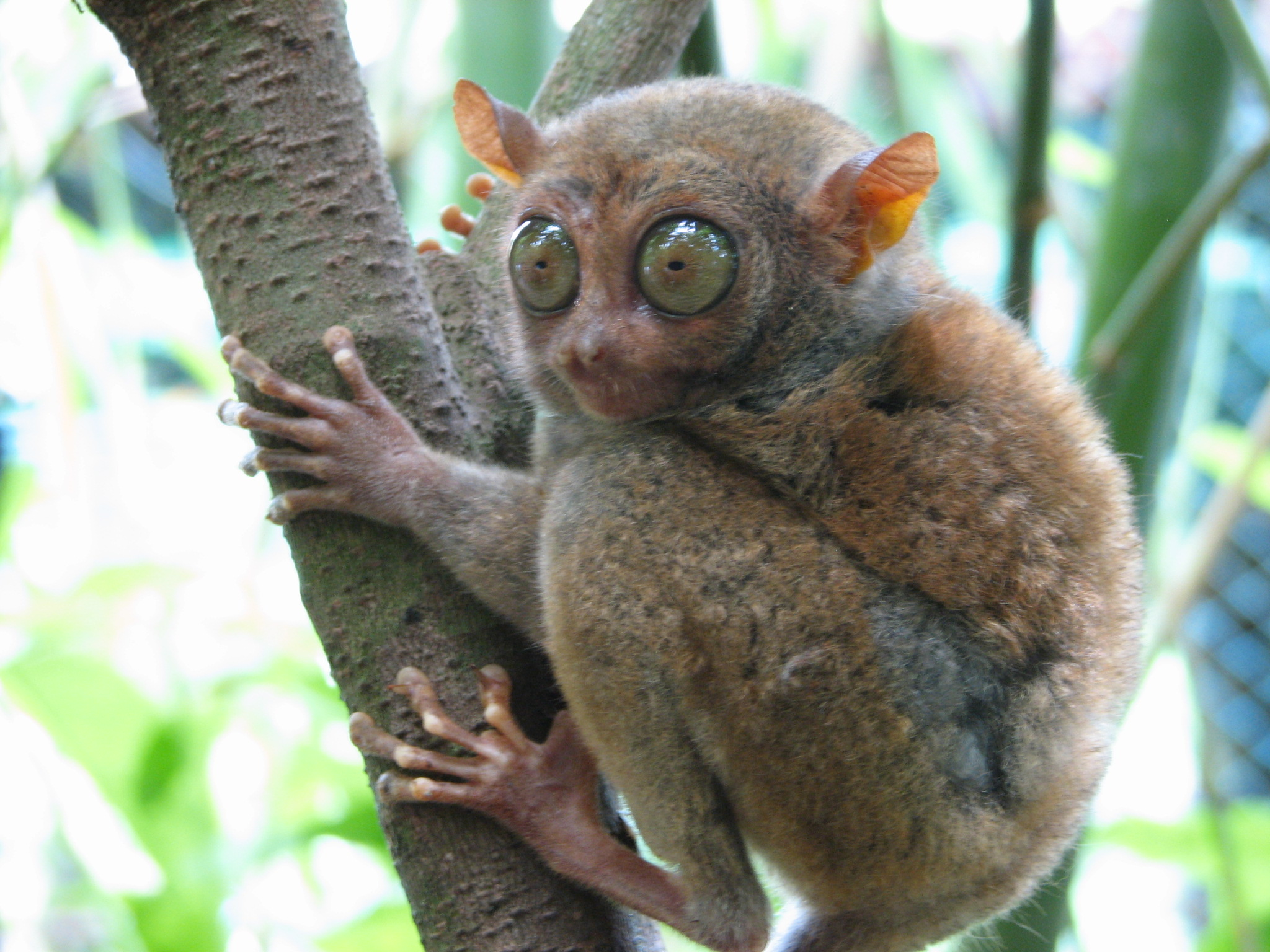
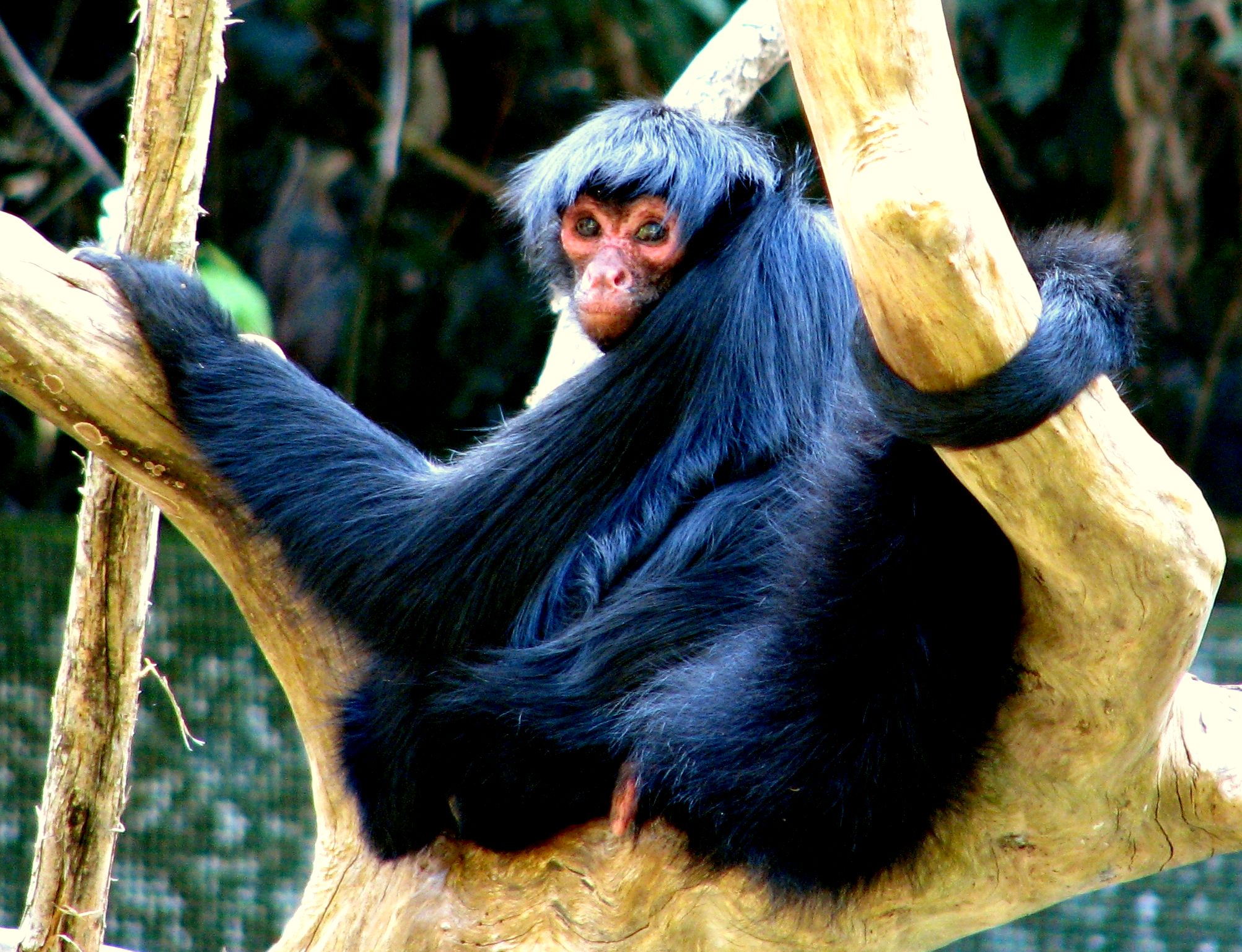
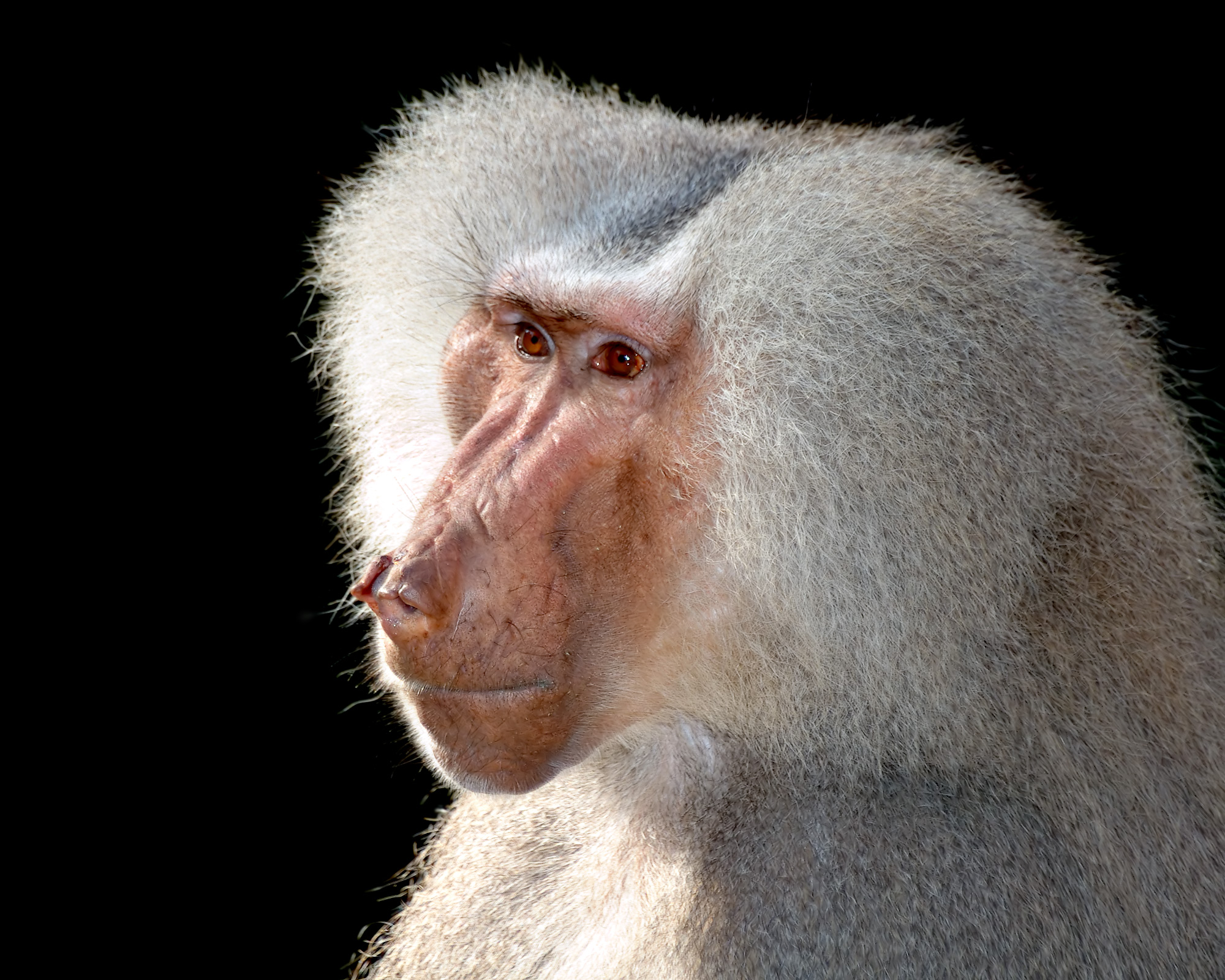
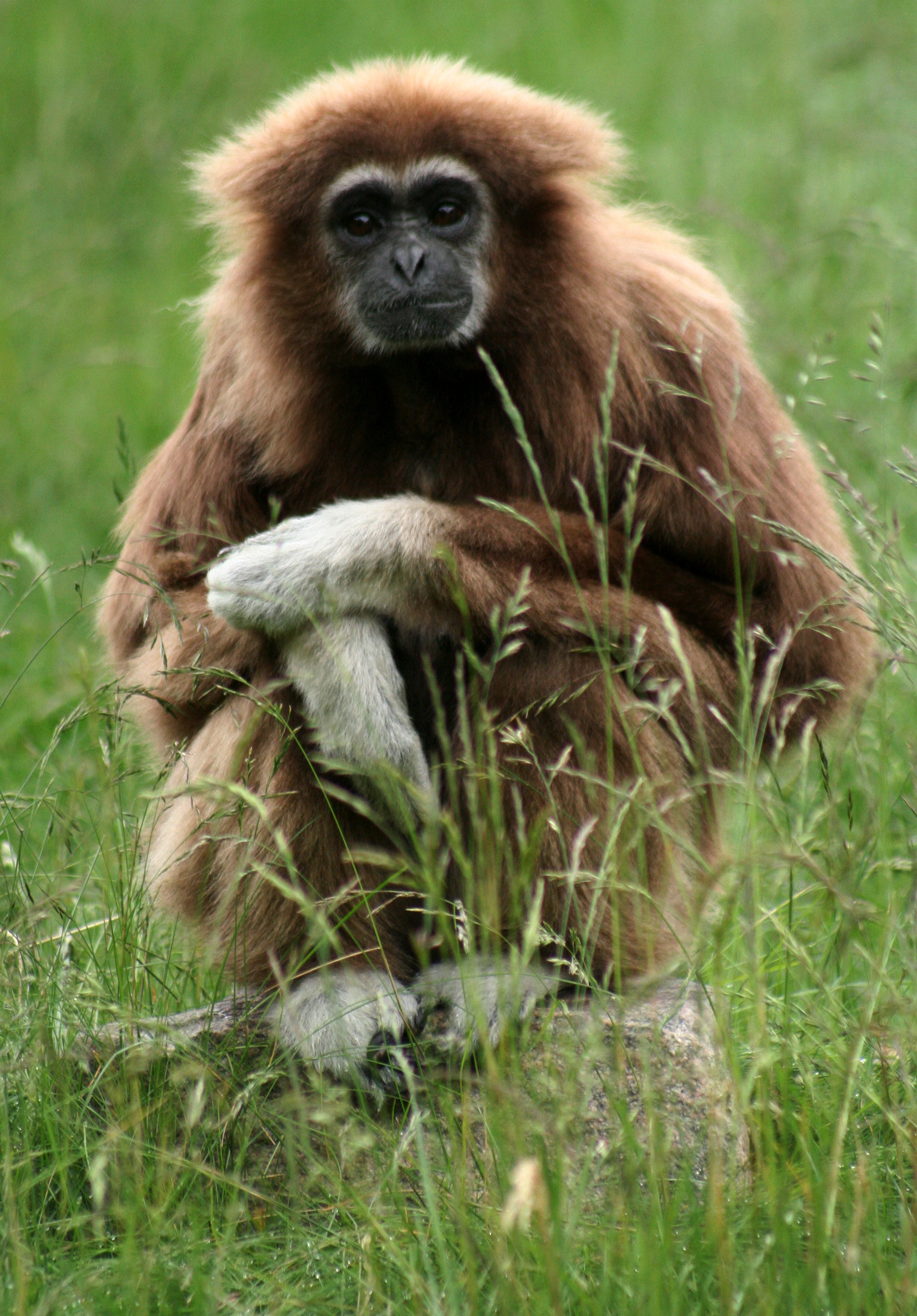
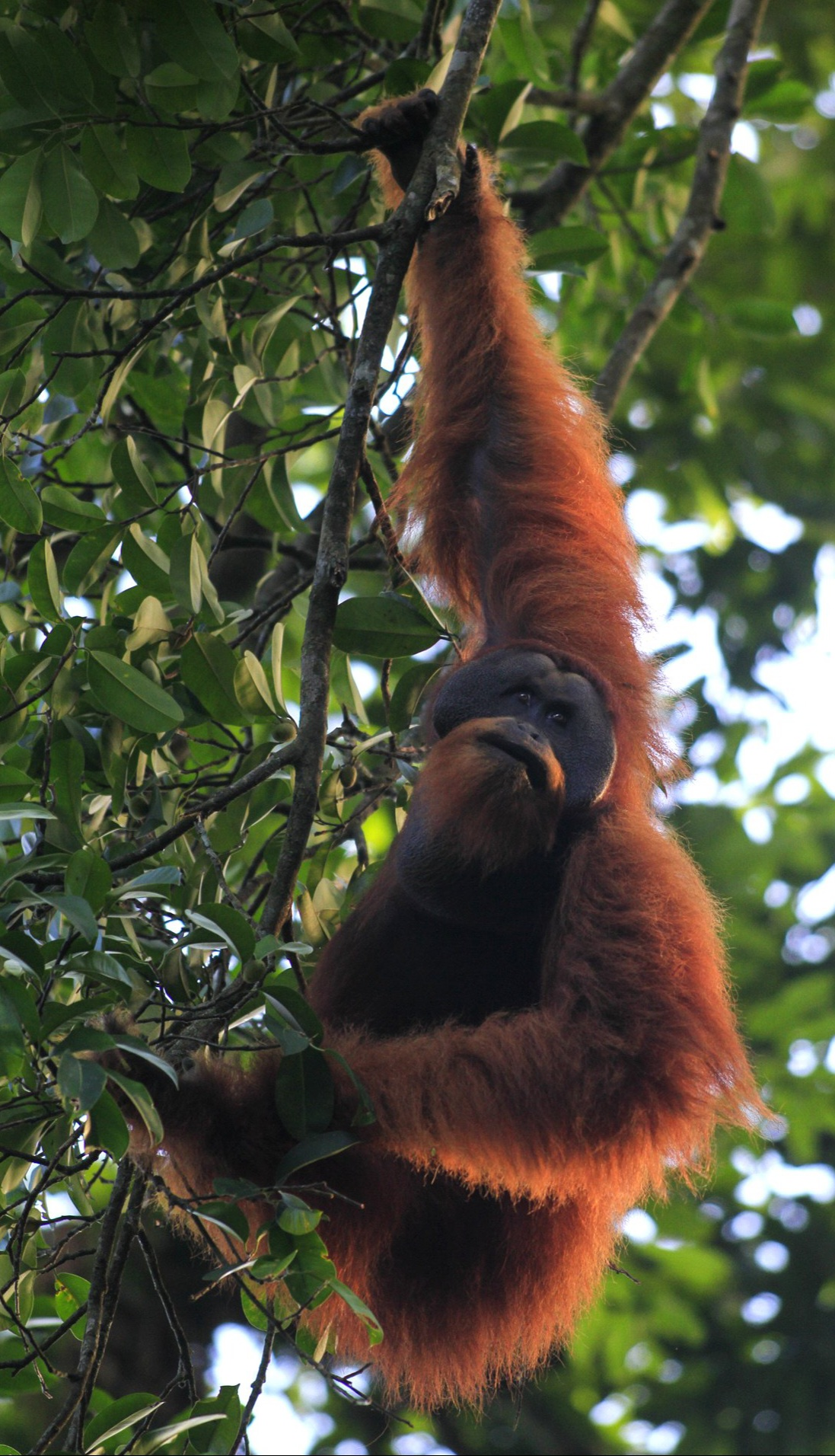
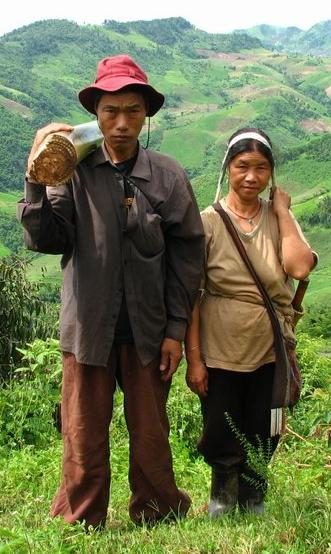
- Ring-tailed lemur Red slender loris Northern greater galago Philippine tarsier Black spider monkey Hamadryas baboon Lar gibbon Sumatran orangutan Humans

Scientific classification
- Kingdom: Animalia
- Phylum: Chordata
- Class: Mammalia
- Clade: Pan-Primates
- Order: Primates; Linnaeus, 1758

Suborders
- Strepsirrhini; Haplorhini; †Altiatlasius
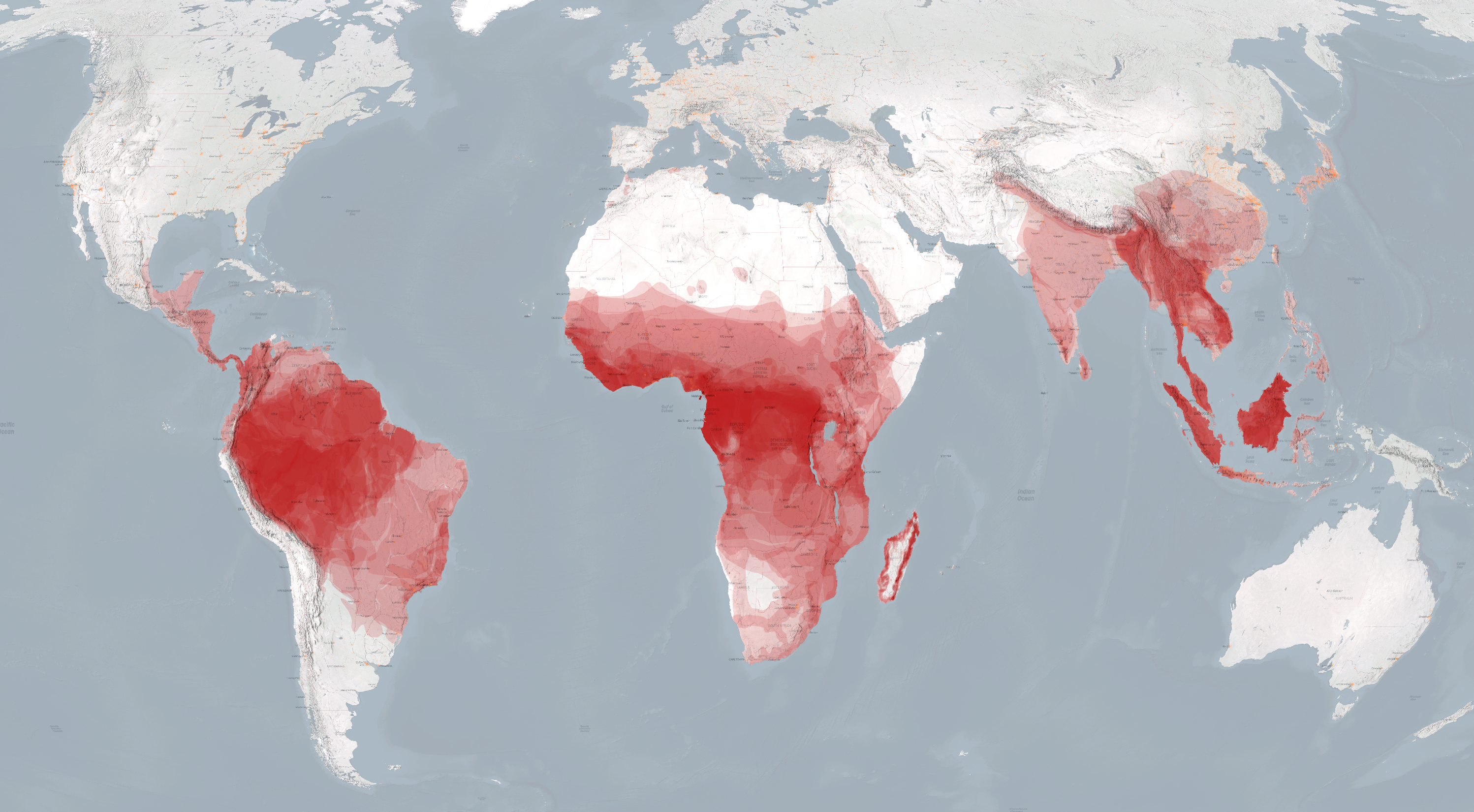
- Range and density of non-human primates.

Synonyms
- Plesiadapiformes (cladistically including crown primates)

= Primate =

Primates Temporal range: Early Paleocene to Present 65.9–0 Ma (Suspected Late Cretaceous origins based on molecular clock)

Order of mammals

Primates is an order of mammals, which is further divided into the strepsirrhines, which include lemurs, galagos, and lorisids; and the haplorhines, which include tarsiers and simians (monkeys and apes). Primates arose 74–63 million years ago first from small terrestrial mammals, which adapted for life in tropical forests: many primate characteristics represent adaptations to the challenging environment among tree tops, including large brain sizes, binocular vision, color vision, vocalizations, shoulder girdles allowing a large degree of movement in the upper limbs, and opposable thumbs (in most but not all) that enable better grasping and dexterity. Primates range in size from Madame Berthe's mouse lemur, which weighs 30 g (1 oz), to the eastern gorilla, weighing over 200 kg (440 lb). There are 376–524 species of living primates, depending on which classification is used. New primate species continue to be discovered: over 25 species were described in the 2000s, 36 in the 2010s, and six in the 2020s.

Primates have large brains (relative to body size) compared to other mammals, as well as an increased reliance on visual acuity at the expense of the sense of smell, which is the dominant sensory system in most mammals. These features are more developed in monkeys and apes, and noticeably less so in lorises and lemurs. Some primates, including gorillas, humans and baboons, are primarily ground-dwelling rather than arboreal, but all species have adaptations for climbing trees. Arboreal locomotion techniques used include leaping from tree to tree and swinging between branches of trees (brachiation); terrestrial locomotion techniques include walking on two hindlimbs (bipedalism) and modified walking on four limbs (quadrupedalism) via knuckle-walking.

Primates are among the most social of all animals, forming pairs or family groups, uni-male harems, and multi-male/multi-female groups. Non-human primates have at least four types of social systems, many defined by the amount of movement by adolescent females between groups. Primates have slower rates of development than other similarly sized mammals, reach maturity later, and have longer lifespans. Primates are also the most cognitively advanced animals, with humans (genus Homo) capable of creating complex languages and sophisticated civilizations, while non-human primates have been recorded using tools. They may communicate using facial and hand gestures, smells and vocalizations.

Close interactions between humans and non-human primates (NHPs) can create opportunities for the transmission of zoonotic diseases, especially virus diseases including herpes, measles, ebola, rabies and hepatitis. Thousands of non-human primates are used in research around the world because of their psychological and physiological similarity to humans. About 60% of primate species are threatened with extinction. Common threats include deforestation, forest fragmentation, monkey drives, and primate hunting for use in medicines, as pets, and for food. Large-scale tropical forest clearing for agriculture most threatens primates.

== Etymology and classification ==
=== Common names ===
The English name primates is derived from Old French or French primat, from a noun use of Latin prīmās (genitive prīmātis, stem prīmāt-) 'one of the first, principal; chief, excellent, noble', from prīmus 'first'. The name was given by Carl Linnaeus because he thought this the "highest" order of animals. The relationships among the different groups of primates were not clearly understood until relatively recently, so the commonly used terms are somewhat confused. For example, ape has been used either as an alternative for monkey or for any tailless, relatively humanoid or human-like primate.

Sir Wilfrid Le Gros Clark was one of the primatologists who developed the idea of trends in primate evolution and the methodology of arranging the living members of an order into an "ascending series" leading to humans. Commonly used names for groups of primates such as prosimians, monkeys, lesser apes, and great apes reflect this methodology. According to our current understanding of the evolutionary history of the primates, several of these groups are paraphyletic, or rather they do not include all the descendants of a common ancestor.

In contrast with Clark's methodology, modern classifications typically identify (or name) only those groupings that are monophyletic; that is, such a named group includes all the descendants of the group's common ancestor.

The cladogram below shows one possible classification sequence of the living primates, with common (traditional) name groupings on the right:

- Primatomorpha
  - Dermoptera
  - Primates
    - Strepsirrhini
      - Lemuriformes (Note: Although the monophyletic relationship between lemurs and lorisoids is widely accepted, their clade name is not. The term "lemuriform" is used here because it derives from one popular taxonomy that clumps the clade of toothcombed primates into one infraorder and the extinct, non-toothcombed adapiforms into another, both within the suborder Strepsirrhini. However, another popular alternative taxonomy places the lorisoids in their own infraorder, Lorisiformes.)
        - lemurs (superfamily Lemuroidea)
        - lorises and allies (superfamily Lorisoidea)
    - Haplorhini
      - Tarsiiformes
        tarsiers (superfamily Tarsioidea)
      - Simiiformes
        - New World monkeys (parvorder Platyrrhini)
        - Catarrhini
          - Old World monkeys (superfamily Cercopithecoidea)
          - Hominoidea
            - gibbons (family Hylobatidae)
            - Hominidae
              - orangutans (subfamily Ponginae)
              - Homininae
                - gorillas (tribe Gorillini)
                - Hominini
                  - humans (g. Homo)
                  - chimpanzees, bonobos (g. Pan)

- Prosimians contain two monophyletic groups (the suborder Strepsirrhini, or lemurs, lorises and allies, as well as the tarsiers of the suborder Haplorhini); it is a paraphyletic grouping because it excludes the Simiiformes, which also are descendants of the common ancestor Primates.
- Monkeys comprise two monophyletic groups, New World monkeys and Old World monkeys, but is paraphyletic because it excludes hominoids, superfamily Hominoidea, also descendants of the common ancestor Simiiformes.
- Apes as a whole, and the great apes, are paraphyletic if the terms are used such that they exclude humans.

Thus, the members of the two sets of groups, and hence names, do not match, which causes problems in relating scientific names to common (usually traditional) names. Consider the superfamily Hominoidea: In terms of the common names on the right, this group consists of apes and humans and there is no single common name for all the members of the group. One remedy is to create a new common name, in this case hominoids. Another possibility is to expand the use of one of the traditional names. For example, in his 2005 book, the vertebrate palaeontologist Benton wrote, "The apes, Hominoidea, today include the gibbons and orangutan ... the gorilla and chimpanzee ... and humans"; thereby Benton was using apes to mean hominoids. In that case, the group heretofore called apes must now be identified as the non-human apes.

As of 2021, there is no consensus as to whether to accept traditional (that is, common), but paraphyletic, names or to use monophyletic names only; or to use 'new' common names or adaptations of old ones. Both competing approaches can be found in biological sources, often in the same work, and sometimes by the same author. Thus, Benton defines apes to include humans, then he repeatedly uses ape-like to mean 'like an ape rather than a human'; and when discussing the reaction of others to a new fossil he writes of "claims that Orrorin ... was an ape rather than a human".

=== Classification ===
In 1758, Carl Linnaeus established Order Primates in the tenth edition of his book Systema Naturae, for the genera Homo (humans), Simia (other apes and monkeys), Lemur (prosimians) and Vespertilio (bats). In the first edition of the same book (1735), he had used the name Anthropomorpha for Homo, Simia and Bradypus (sloths). In 1839, Henri Marie Ducrotay de Blainville, following Linnaeus and aping his nomenclature, established the orders Secundates (including the suborders Chiroptera, Insectivora and Carnivora), Tertiates (or Glires) and Quaternates (including Gravigrada, Pachydermata and Ruminantia), but these new taxa were not accepted.

Before Anderson and Jones introduced the classification of Strepsirrhini and Haplorhini in 1984, (followed by McKenna and Bell's 1997 work Classification of Mammals: Above the species level), Primates was divided into two superfamilies: Prosimii and Anthropoidea. Prosimii included all of the prosimians: Strepsirrhini plus the tarsiers. Anthropoidea contained all of the simians.

== Phylogeny and genetics ==
- Euarchontoglires
  - Glires
    - Rodentia (rodents)
    - Lagomorpha (rabbits, hares, pikas)
  - Euarchonta
    - Scandentia (treeshrews)
    - Primatomorpha
      - Dermoptera (colugos)
      - Primates
        - †Plesiadapiformes
        - crown primates

Order Primates is part of the clade Euarchontoglires, which is nested within the clade Eutheria of Class Mammalia. Recent molecular genetic research on primates, colugos, and treeshrews has shown that the two species of colugos are more closely related to primates than to treeshrews, even though treeshrews were at one time considered primates. These three orders make up the clade Euarchonta. The combination of this clade with the clade Glires (composed of Rodentia and Lagomorpha) forms the clade Euarchontoglires. Variously, both Euarchonta and Euarchontoglires are ranked as superorders. Some scientists consider Dermoptera to be a suborder of Primates and use the suborder Euprimates for the "true" primates.

=== Evolutionary history ===
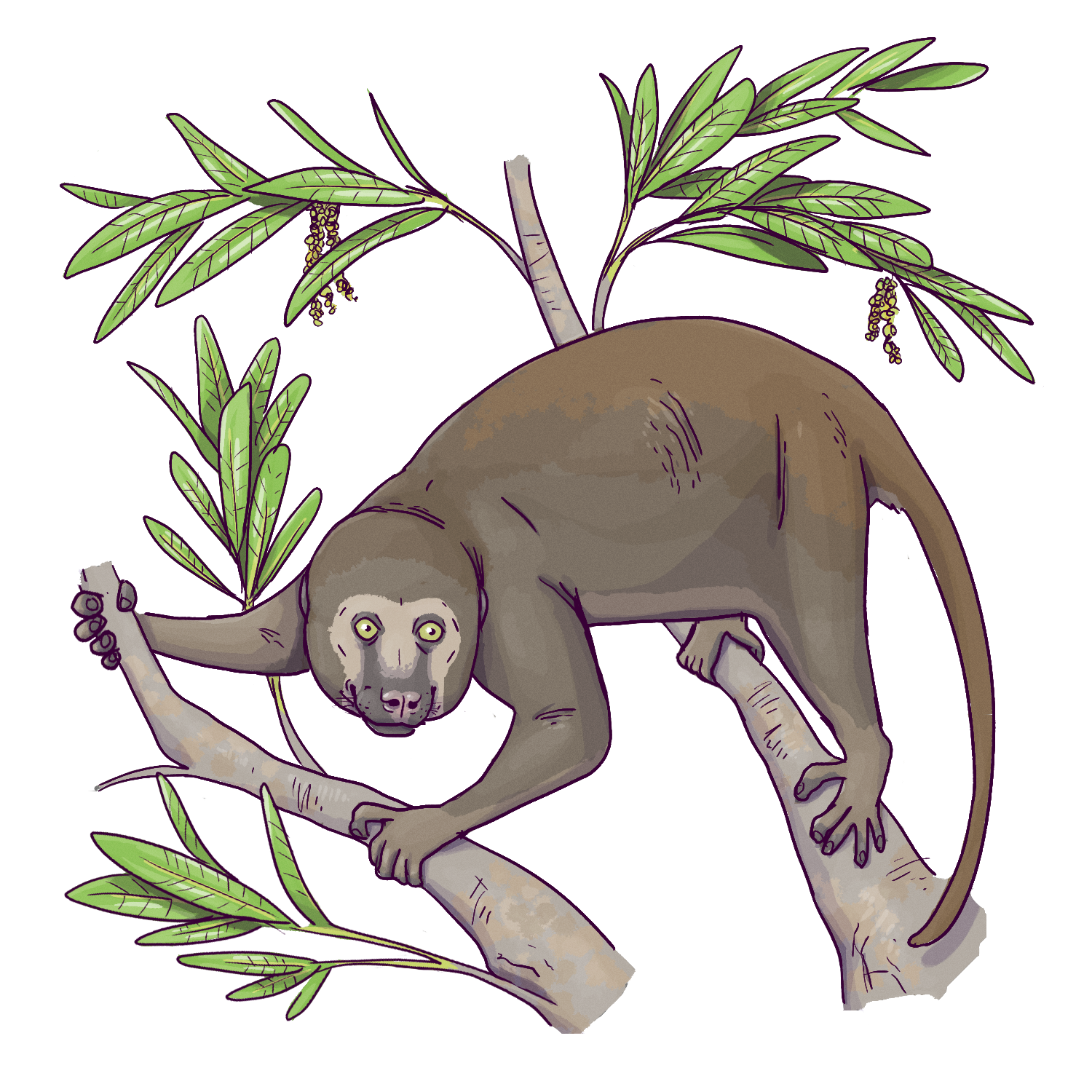
Restoration of Adapis, an early adapiform primate related to lemurs that lived during the Paleogene

Some molecular clock studies, have estimated the origin of the primate branch around 85 mya. However, other studies have placed the origin of the order closer to the Cretaceous–Paleogene boundary, around 74–63 (mya). The earliest possible primate/proto-primate may be Purgatorius, which dates back to Early Paleocene of North America ~66mya. The oldest known primates from the fossil record date to the Late Paleocene of Africa, c.57 mya (Altiatlasius) or the Paleocene-Eocene transition in the northern continents, c. 55 mya (Cantius, Donrussellia, Altanius, Plesiadapis and Teilhardina).

By modern cladistic reckoning, the order Primates is monophyletic. The suborder Strepsirrhini, the "wet-nosed" primates, is generally thought to have split off from the primitive primate line about 63 mya, although earlier dates are also supported. The seven strepsirrhine families are the five related lemur families and the two remaining families that include the lorisids and the galagos. Older classification schemes wrap Lepilemuridae into Lemuridae and Galagidae into Lorisidae, yielding a four-one family distribution instead of five-two as presented here. During the Eocene, most of the northern continents were dominated by two groups, the adapiforms and the omomyids. The former are considered members of Strepsirrhini, but did not have a toothcomb like modern lemurs; recent analysis has demonstrated that Darwinius masillae fits into this grouping. The latter was closely related to tarsiers, monkeys, and apes. How these two groups relate to extant primates is unclear. Omomyids perished about 30 mya, while adapiforms survived until about 10 mya.

According to genetic studies, the lemurs of Madagascar diverged from the lorisoids approximately 75 mya. These studies, as well as chromosomal and molecular evidence, also show that lemurs are more closely related to each other than to other strepsirrhine primates. However, Madagascar split from Africa 160 mya and from India 90 mya. To account for these facts, a founding lemur population of a few individuals is thought to have reached Madagascar from Africa via a single rafting event between 50 and 80 mya. Other colonization options have been suggested, such as multiple colonizations from Africa and India, but none are supported by the genetic and molecular evidence.

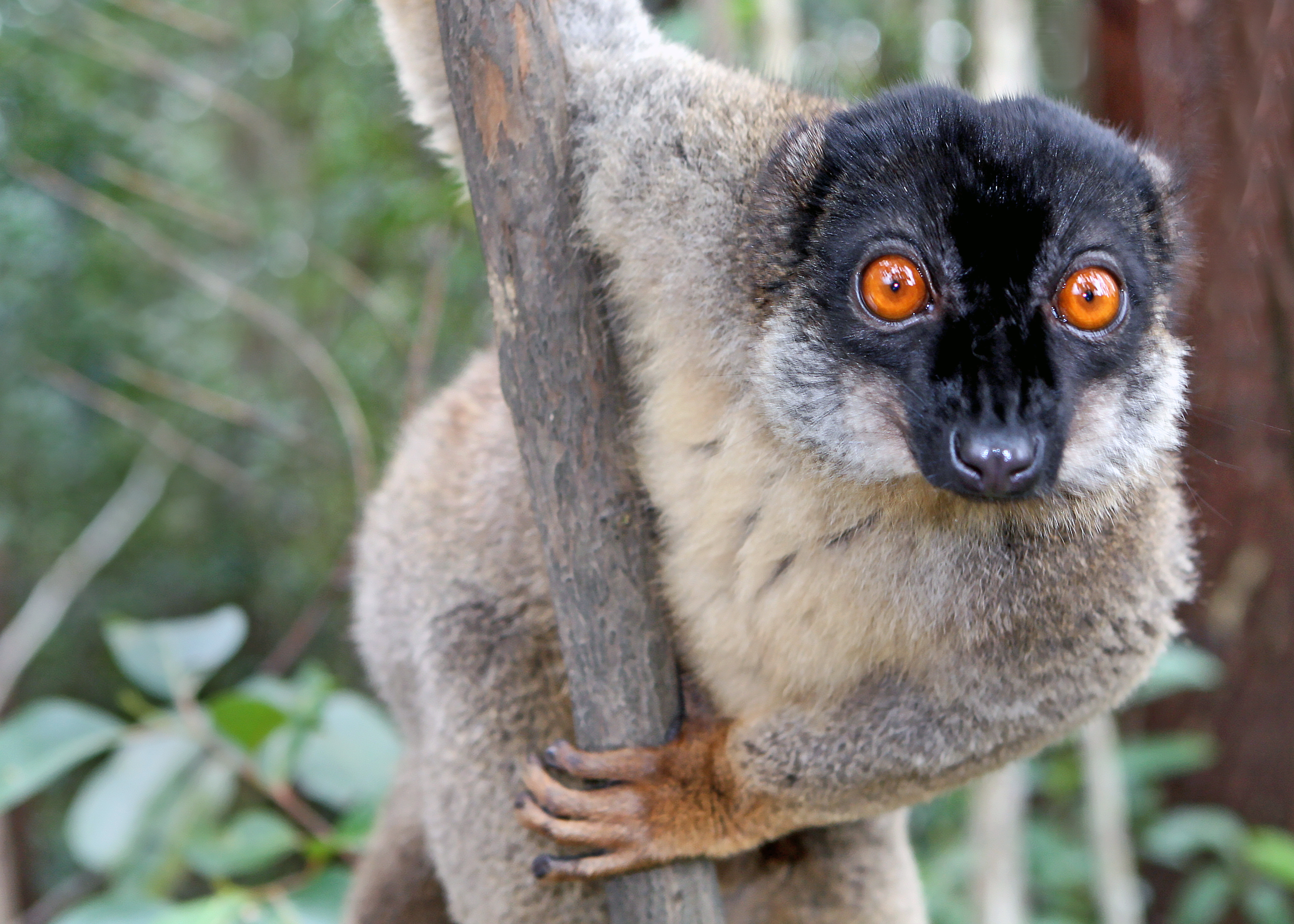
Common brown lemur, a strepsirrhine primate

Until recently, the aye-aye has been difficult to place within Strepsirrhini. Theories had been proposed that its family, Daubentoniidae, was either a lemuriform primate (meaning its ancestors split from the lemur line more recently than lemurs and lorises split) or a sister group to all the other strepsirrhines. In 2008, the aye-aye family was confirmed to be most closely related to the other Malagasy lemurs, likely having descended from the same ancestral population that colonized the island.

Suborder Haplorhini, the simple-nosed or "dry-nosed" primates, is composed of two sister clades. Prosimian tarsiers in the family Tarsiidae (monotypic in its own infraorder Tarsiiformes), represent the most basal division, originating about 58 mya. The earliest known haplorhine skeleton, that of 55 MA old tarsier-like Archicebus, was found in central China, supporting an already suspected Asian origin for the group. The infraorder Simiiformes (simian primates, consisting of monkeys and apes) emerged about 40 mya, possibly also in Asia; if so, they dispersed across the Tethys Sea from Asia to Africa soon afterwards. There are two simian clades, both parvorders: Catarrhini, which developed in Africa, consisting of Old World monkeys, humans and the other apes, and Platyrrhini, which developed in South America, consisting of New World monkeys. A third clade, which included the eosimiids, developed in Asia, but became extinct millions of years ago.

As in the case of lemurs, the origin of New World monkeys is unclear. Molecular studies of concatenated nuclear sequences have yielded a widely varying estimated date of divergence between platyrrhines and catarrhines, ranging from 33 to 70 mya, while studies based on mitochondrial sequences produce a narrower range of 35 to 43 mya. The anthropoid primates possibly traversed the Atlantic Ocean from Africa to South America during the Eocene by island hopping, facilitated by Atlantic Ocean ridges and a lowered sea level. Alternatively, a single rafting event may explain this transoceanic colonization. Due to continental drift, the Atlantic Ocean was not nearly as wide at the time as it is today. Research suggests that a small 1 kg (2.2 lb) primate could have survived 13 days on a raft of vegetation. Given estimated current and wind speeds, this would have provided enough time to make the voyage between the continents.

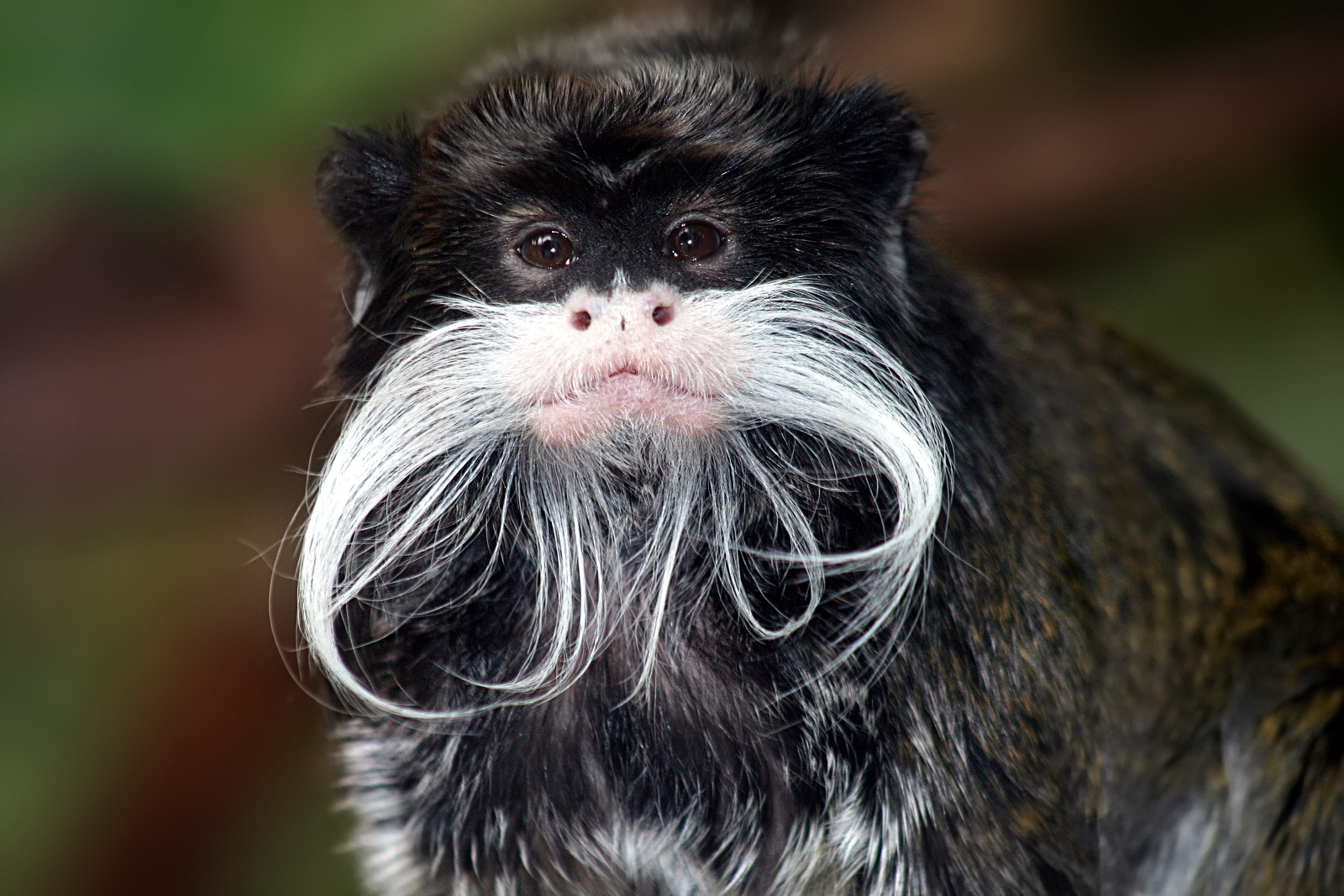
Emperor tamarin, a New World monkey

Apes and monkeys spread from Africa into Europe and Asia starting in the Miocene. Soon after, the lorises and tarsiers made the same journey. The first hominin fossils were discovered in northern Africa and date back 5–8 mya. Old World monkeys disappeared from Europe about 1.8 mya. Molecular and fossil studies generally show that modern humans originated in Africa 100,000–200,000 years ago.

Although primates are well studied in comparison to other animal groups, several new species have been discovered recently, and genetic tests have revealed previously unrecognised species in known populations. Primate Taxonomy listed about 350 species of primates in 2001; the author, Colin Groves, increased that number to 376 for his contribution to the third edition of Mammal Species of the World (MSW3). However, publications since the taxonomy in MSW3 was compiled in 2003 have pushed the number to 522 species, or 708 including subspecies.

=== Hybrids ===
Primate hybrids usually arise in captivity, but there have also been examples in the wild. Hybridization occurs where two species' range overlap to form hybrid zones; hybrids may be created by humans when animals are placed in zoos or due to environmental pressures such as predation. Intergeneric hybridizations, hybrids of different genera, have also been found in the wild. Although they belong to genera that have been distinct for several million years, interbreeding still occurs between the gelada and the hamadryas baboon.

=== Clones ===
On 24 January 2018, scientists in China reported in the journal Cell the creation of two crab-eating macaque clones, named Zhong Zhong and Hua Hua, using the complex DNA transfer method that produced Dolly the sheep, for the first time.

== Anatomy and physiology ==
=== Head ===
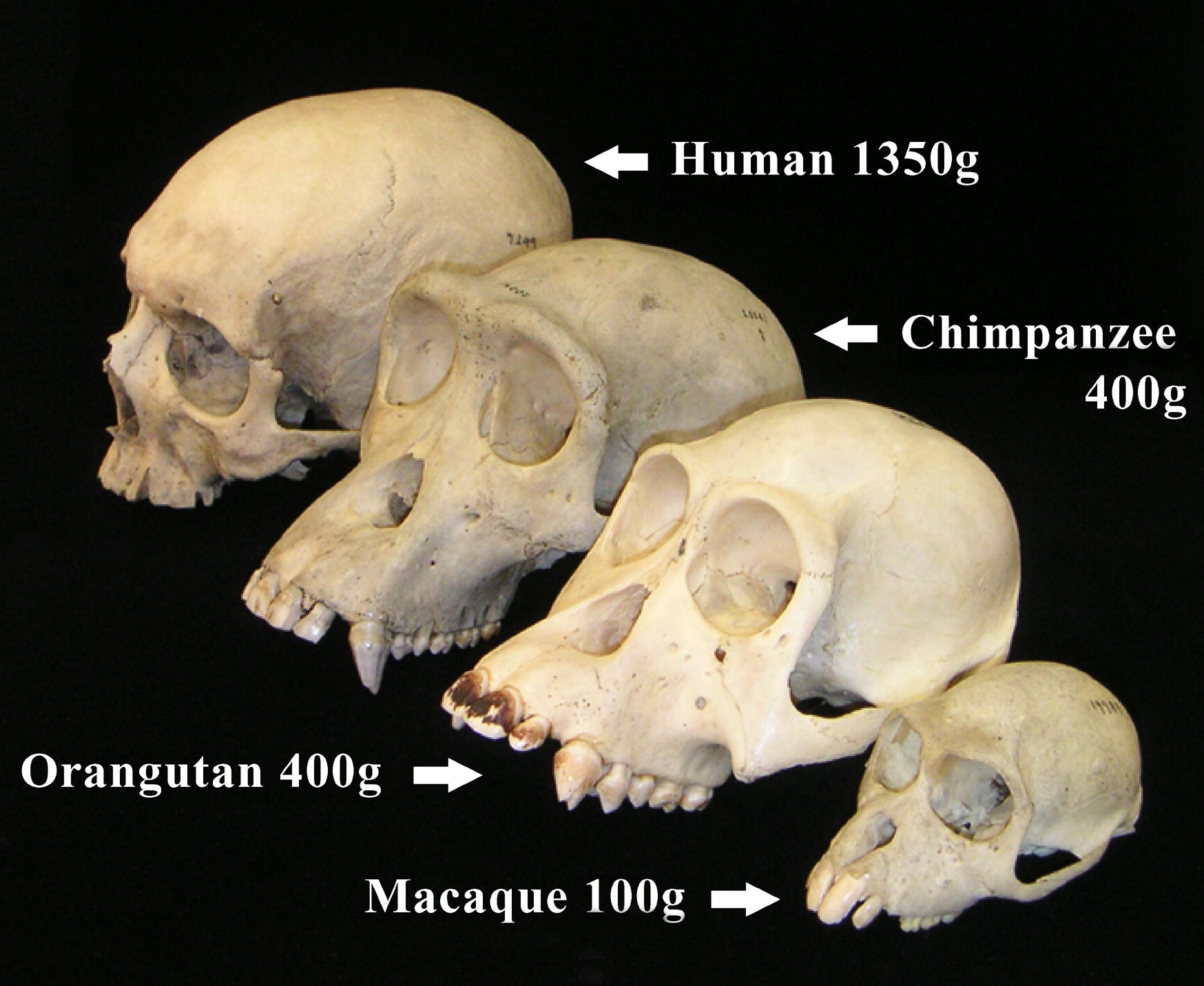
Primate skulls showing postorbital bar, and increasing brain sizes

The primate skull has a large, domed cranium, which is particularly prominent in anthropoids. The cranium protects the large brain, a distinguishing characteristic of this group. The endocranial volume (the volume within the skull) is three times greater in humans than in the greatest nonhuman primate, reflecting a larger brain size. The mean endocranial volume is 1,201 cubic centimeters in humans, 469 cm^{3} in gorillas, 400 cm^{3} in chimpanzees and 397 cm^{3} in orangutans. The primary evolutionary trend of primates has been the elaboration of the brain, in particular the neocortex (a part of the cerebral cortex), which is involved with sensory perception, generation of motor commands, spatial reasoning, conscious thought and, in humans, language. While other mammals rely heavily on their sense of smell, the arboreal life of primates has led to a tactile, visually dominant sensory system, a reduction in the olfactory region of the brain and increasingly complex social behavior. The visual acuity of humans and other hominids is exceptional; they have the most acute vision known among all vertebrates, with the exception of certain species of predatory birds.

Primates have forward-facing eyes on the front of the skull; binocular vision allows accurate distance perception, useful for the brachiating ancestors of all great apes. A bony ridge above the eye sockets reinforces weaker bones in the face, which are put under strain during chewing. Strepsirrhines have a postorbital bar, a bone around the eye socket, to protect their eyes; in contrast, the higher primates, haplorhines, have evolved fully enclosed sockets.

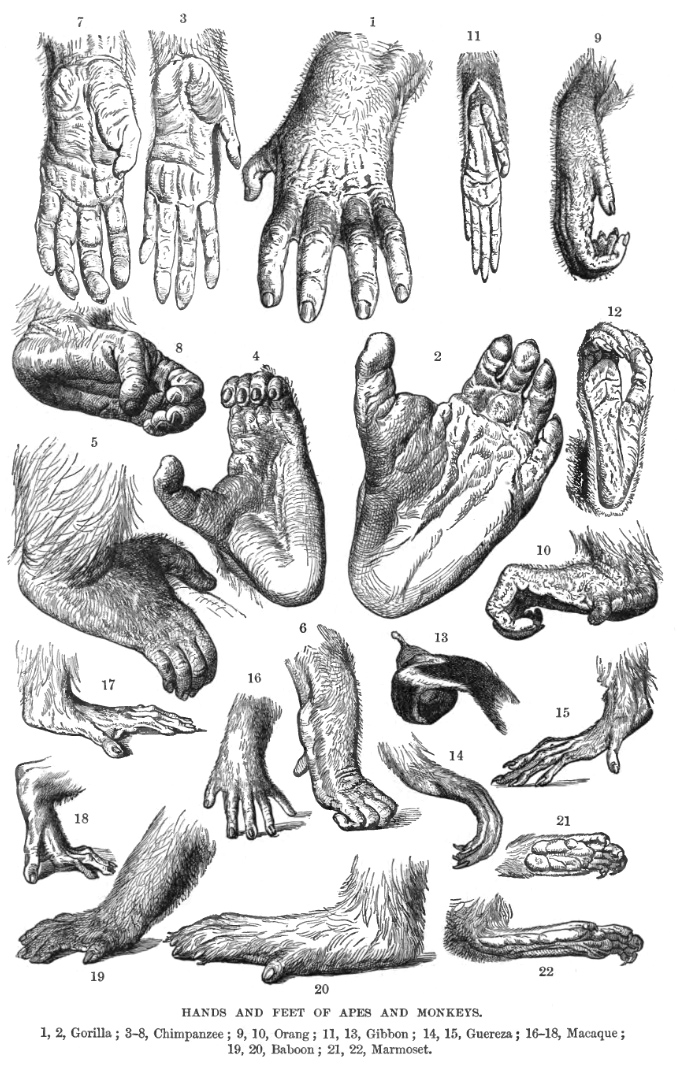
An 1893 drawing of the hands and feet of various primates

Primates show an evolutionary trend towards a reduced snout. Technically, Old World monkeys are distinguished from New World monkeys by the structure of the nose, and from apes by the arrangement of their teeth. In New World monkeys, the nostrils face sideways; in Old World monkeys, they face downwards. Dental pattern in primates vary considerably; although some have lost most of their incisors, all retain at least one lower incisor. In most strepsirrhines, the lower incisors form a toothcomb, which is used in grooming and sometimes foraging. Old World monkeys have eight premolars, compared with 12 in New World monkeys. The Old World species are divided into apes and monkeys depending on the number of cusps on their molars: monkeys have four, apes have five - although humans may have four or five. The main hominid molar cusp (hypocone) evolved in early primate history, while the cusp of the corresponding primitive lower molar (paraconid) was lost. Prosimians are distinguished by their immobilized upper lips, the moist tip of their noses and forward-facing lower front teeth.

=== Body ===
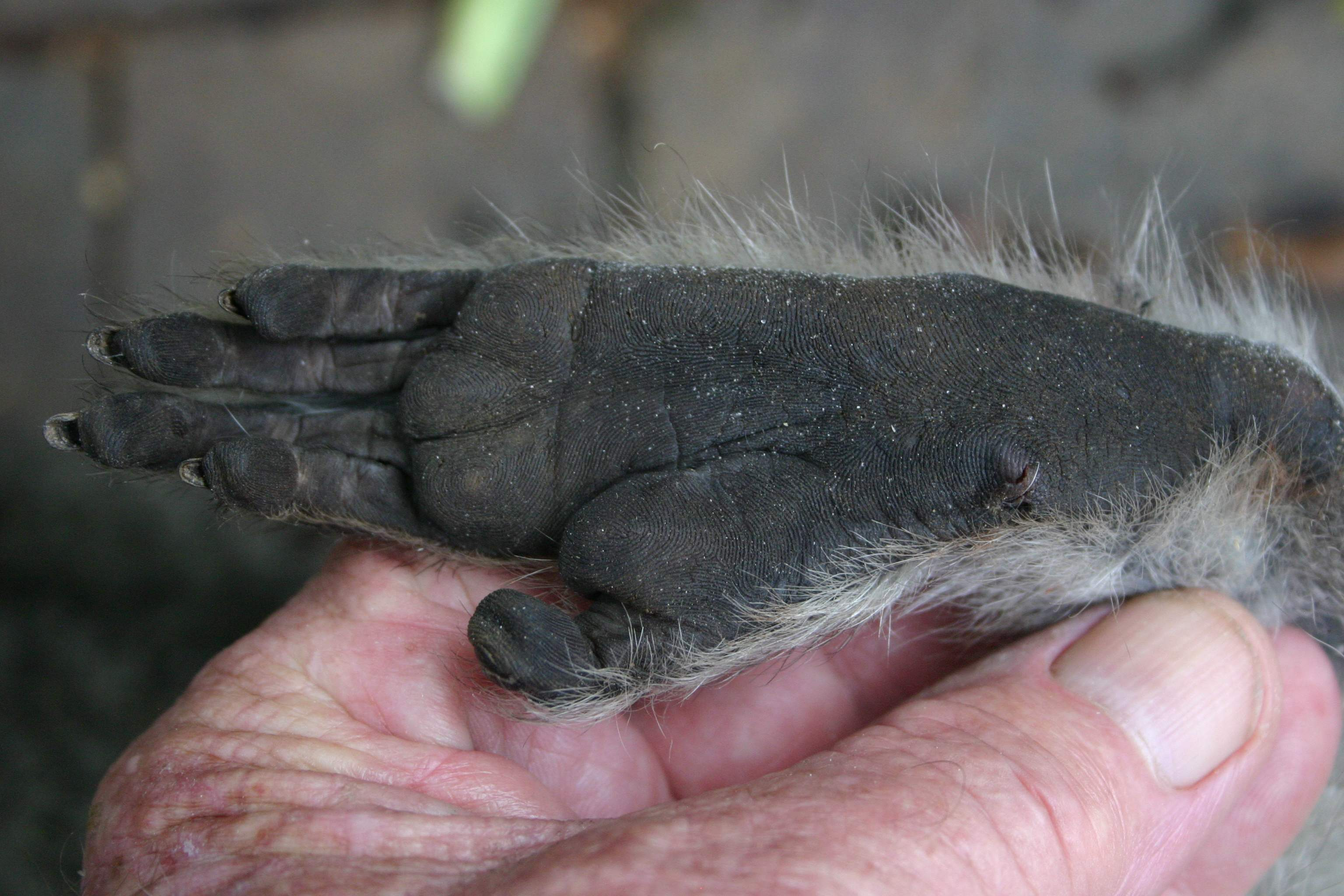
Vervet hindfoot showing fingerprint ridges on the sole

Primates generally have five digits on each limb (pentadactyly), with a characteristic type of keratin fingernail on the end of each finger and toe. The bottom sides of the hands and feet have sensitive pads on the fingertips. Most have opposable thumbs, a characteristic primate feature most developed in humans, though not limited to this order (opossums and koalas, for example, also have them). Thumbs allow some species to use tools. In primates, the combination of opposing thumbs, short fingernails (rather than claws) and long, inward-closing fingers is a relict of the ancestral practice of gripping branches, and has, in part, allowed some species to develop brachiation (swinging by the arms from tree limb to tree limb) as a significant means of locomotion. Prosimians have clawlike nails on the second toe of each foot, called toilet-claws, which they use for grooming.

The primate collar bone is a prominent element of the pectoral girdle; this allows the shoulder joint broad mobility. Compared to Old World monkeys, apes have more mobile shoulder joints and arms due to the dorsal position of the scapula, broad ribcages that are flatter front-to-back, a shorter, less mobile spine, and with lower vertebrae greatly reduced - resulting in tail loss in some species. Prehensile tails are found in the New World atelids, including the howler, spider, woolly spider, woolly monkeys; and in capuchins. Male primates have a low-hanging penis and testes descended into a scrotum.

=== Sexual dimorphism ===
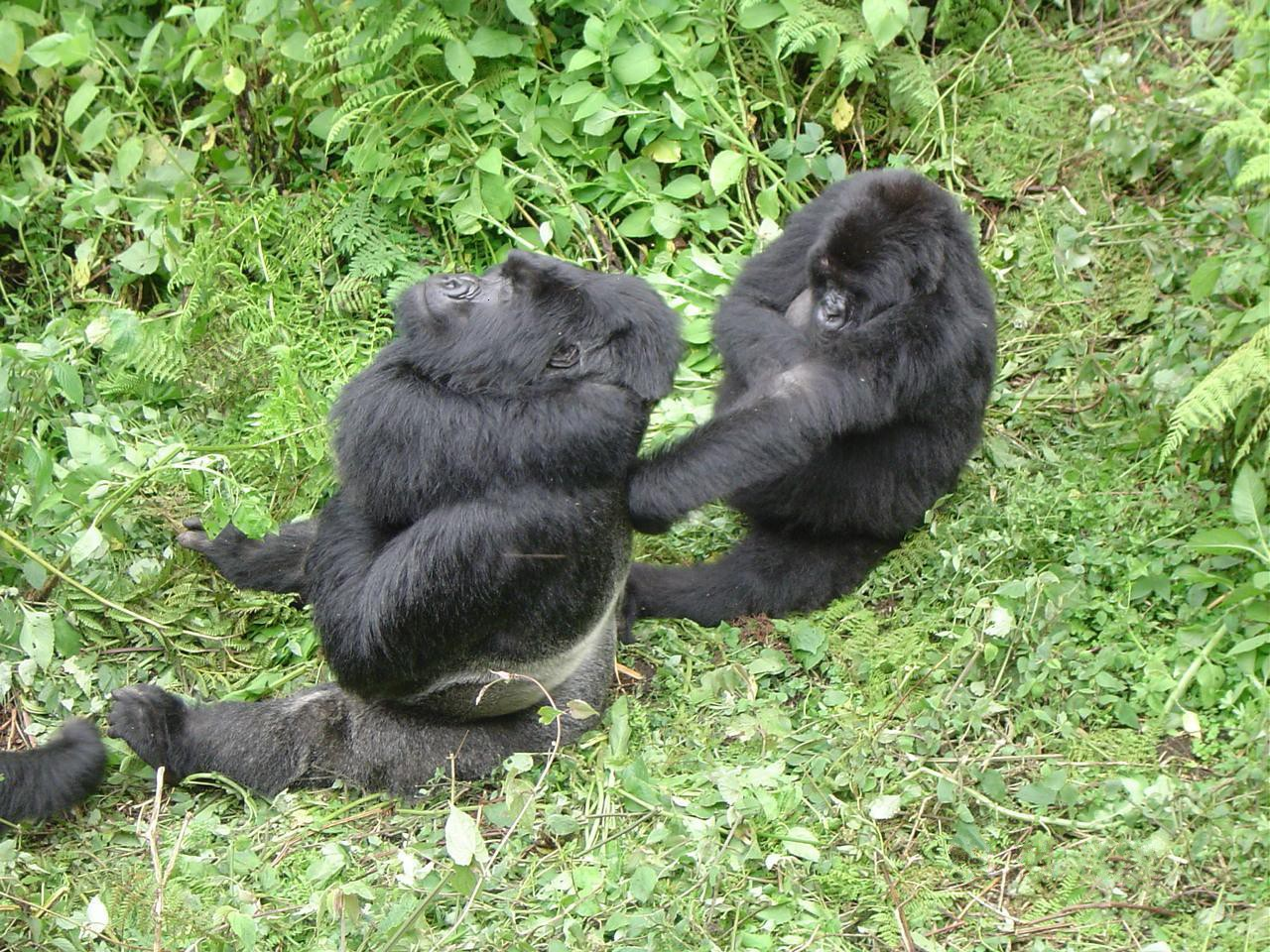
Distinct sexual size dimorphism can be seen between the male and female gorilla.

Sexual dimorphism is often exhibited in simians, though to a greater degree in Old World species (apes and some monkeys) than New World species. Recent studies involve comparing DNA to examine both the variation in the expression of the dimorphism among primates and the fundamental causes of sexual dimorphism. Primates usually have dimorphism in body mass and canine tooth size along with pelage and skin color. The dimorphism can be attributed to and affected by different factors, including mating system, size, habitat and diet.

Comparative analyses have generated a more complete understanding of the relationship between sexual selection, natural selection, and mating systems in primates. Studies have shown that dimorphism is the product of changes in both male and female traits. Ontogenetic scaling, where relative extension of a common growth trajectory occurs, may give some insight into the relationship between sexual dimorphism and growth patterns. Some evidence from the fossil record suggests that there was convergent evolution of dimorphism, and some extinct hominids probably had greater dimorphism than any living primate.

=== Locomotion ===
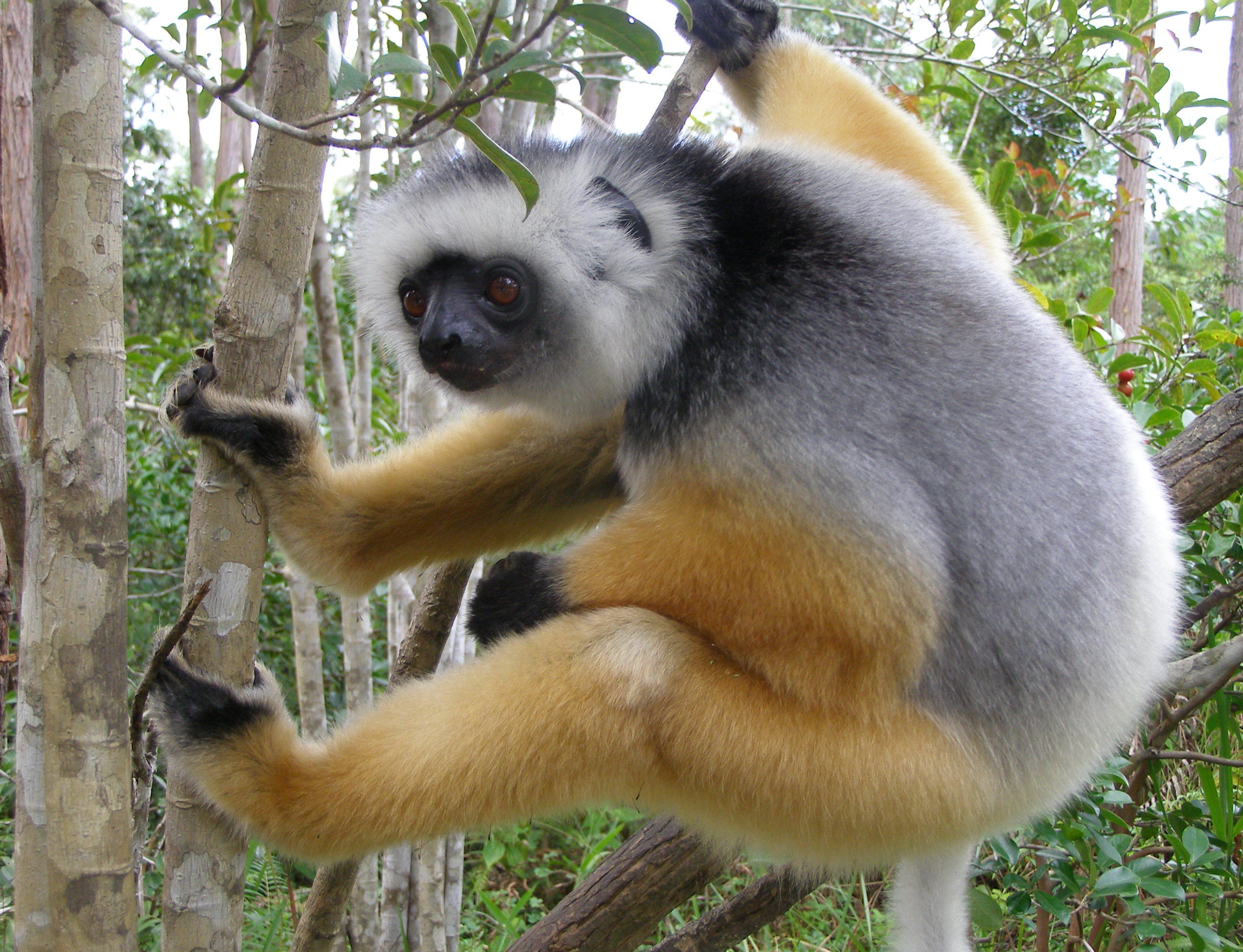
Diademed sifaka, a lemur that is a vertical clinger and leaper

Primate species move by brachiation, bipedalism, leaping, arboreal and terrestrial quadrupedalism, climbing, knuckle-walking or by a combination of these methods. Several prosimians are primarily vertical clingers and leapers. These include many bushbabies, all indriids (i.e., sifakas, avahis and indris), sportive lemurs, and all tarsiers. Other prosimians are arboreal quadrupeds and climbers. Some are also terrestrial quadrupeds, while some are leapers. Most monkeys are both arboreal and terrestrial quadrupeds and climbers. Gibbons, muriquis and spider monkeys all brachiate extensively, with gibbons sometimes doing so in remarkably acrobatic fashion. Woolly monkeys also brachiate at times. Orangutans use a similar form of locomotion called quadramanous climbing, in which they use their arms and legs to carry their heavy bodies through the trees. Chimpanzees and gorillas knuckle walk, and can move bipedally for short distances. Although numerous species, such as australopithecines and early hominids, have exhibited fully bipedal locomotion, humans are the only extant species with this trait.

=== Vision ===
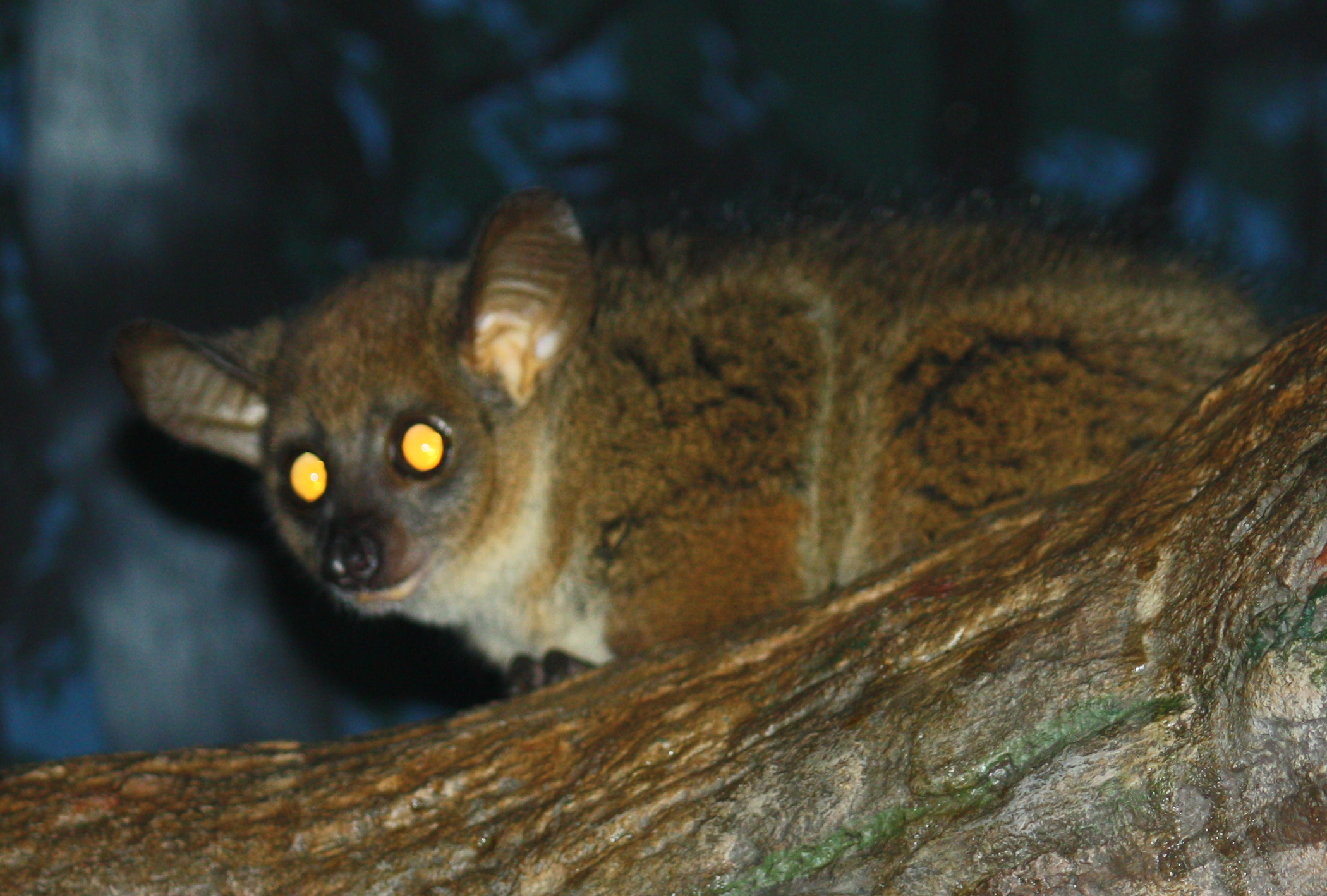
The tapetum lucidum of a northern greater galago, typical of Lemuriformes, reflects the light of the photographer's flash.

The evolution of color vision in primates is unique among most eutherian mammals. While the remote vertebrate ancestors of the primates possessed three color vision (trichromaticism), the nocturnal, warm-blooded, mammalian ancestors lost one of three cones in the retina during the Mesozoic era. Fish, reptiles and birds are therefore trichromatic or tetrachromatic, while all mammals, with the exception of some primates and marsupials, are dichromats or monochromats (totally color blind). Nocturnal primates, such as the night monkeys and bush babies, are often monochromatic. Catarrhines are routinely trichromatic due to a gene duplication of the red-green opsin gene at the base of their lineage, 30 to 40 million years ago. Platyrrhines, on the other hand, are trichromatic in a few cases only. Specifically, individual females must be heterozygous for two alleles of the opsin gene (red and green) located on the same locus of the X chromosome. Males, therefore, can only be dichromatic, while females can be either dichromatic or trichromatic. Color vision in strepsirrhines is not as well understood; however, research indicates a range of color vision similar to that found in platyrrhines.

Like catarrhines, howler monkeys (a family of platyrrhines) show routine trichromatism that has been traced to an evolutionarily recent gene duplication. Howler monkeys are one of the most specialized leaf-eaters of the New World monkeys; fruits are not a major part of their diets, and the type of leaves they prefer to consume (young, nutritive, and digestible) are detectable only by a red-green signal. Field work exploring the dietary preferences of howler monkeys suggests that routine trichromaticism was selected by environment.

== Behavior ==
=== Social systems ===
Richard Wrangham stated that social systems of primates are best classified by the amount of movement by females occurring between groups. He proposed four categories:

- Female transfer systems – females move away from the group in which they were born. Females of a group will not be closely related whereas males will have remained with their natal groups, and this close association may be influential in social behavior. The groups formed are generally quite small. This organization can be seen in chimpanzees, where the males, who are typically related, will cooperate in defense of the group's territory. Evidence of this social system (called patrilocal residence when used by the Anthropology) has also been found among Neanderthal remains in Spain and in remains of Australopithecus and Paranthropus robustus groups in southern Africa. Among New World Monkeys, spider monkeys and muriquis use this system.

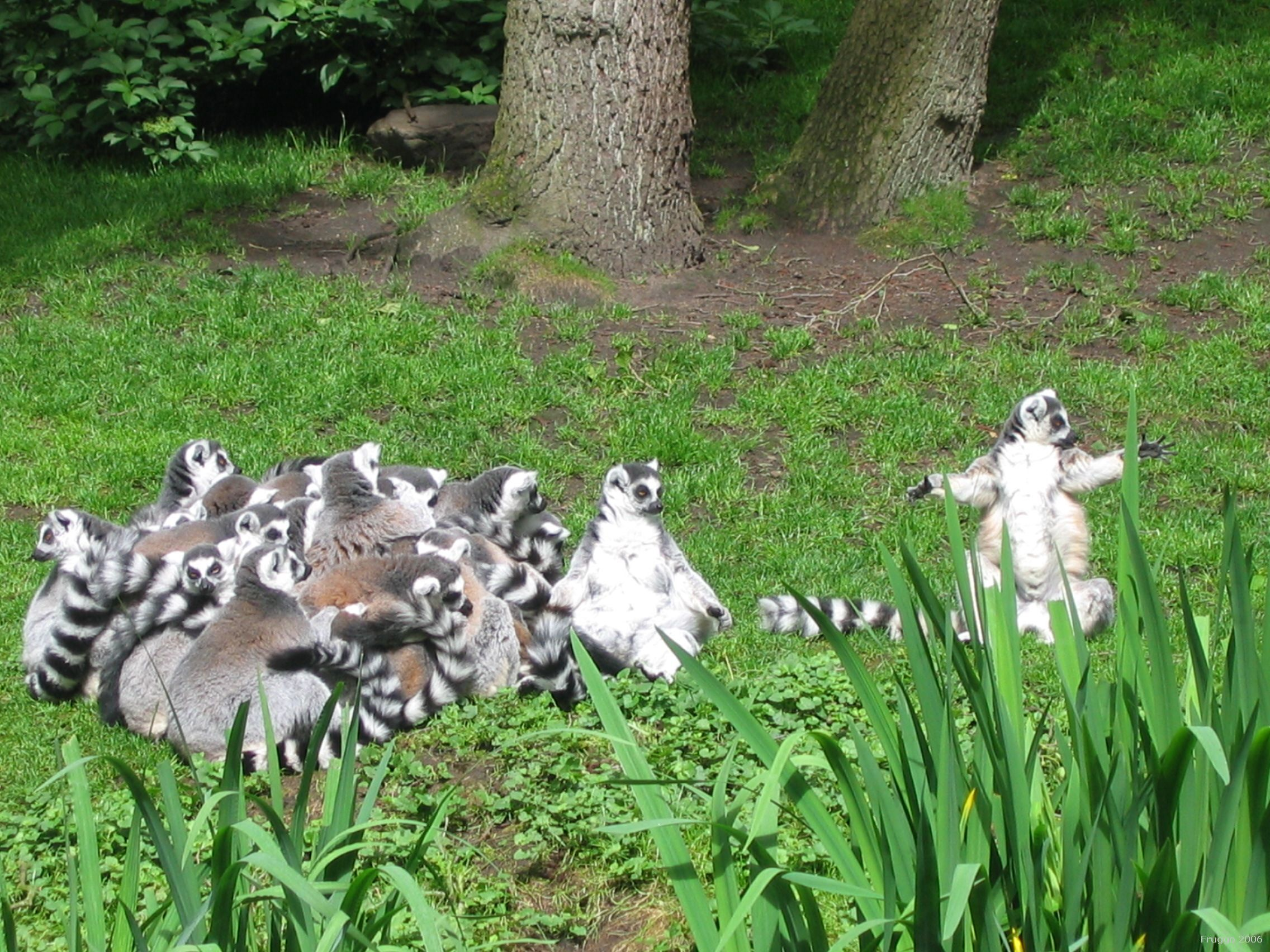
A social huddle of ring-tailed lemurs. The two individuals on the right exposing their white ventral surface are sunning themselves.

- Male transfer systems – while the females remain in their natal groups, the males will emigrate as adolescents. Group sizes are usually larger. This system is common among the ring-tailed lemur, capuchin monkeys and cercopithecine monkeys.
- Monogamous species – a male–female bond, sometimes accompanied by a juvenile offspring. There is shared responsibility of parental care and territorial defense. The offspring leaves the parents' territory during adolescence. Indri, lariang tarsiers, Callitrichidae monkeys and gibbons use this system, although "monogamy" in this context does not necessarily mean absolute sexual fidelity. These species do not live in larger groups.
- Solitary species – males and females live in overlapping home ranges. This type of organization is found in lorises, galagos, mouse lemurs, aye-ayes and orangutans.

Other systems are known to occur as well. For example, with howler monkeys and gorillas both the males and females typically transfer from their natal group on reaching sexual maturity, resulting in groups in which neither the males nor females are typically related. Some prosimians, colobine monkeys and callitrichid monkeys also use this system.

The transfer of females or males from their native group is likely an adaptation for avoiding inbreeding. An analysis of breeding records of captive primate colonies representing numerous different species indicates that the infant mortality of inbred young is generally higher than that of non-inbred young. This effect of inbreeding on infant mortality is probably largely a result of increased expression of deleterious recessive alleles (see Inbreeding depression).

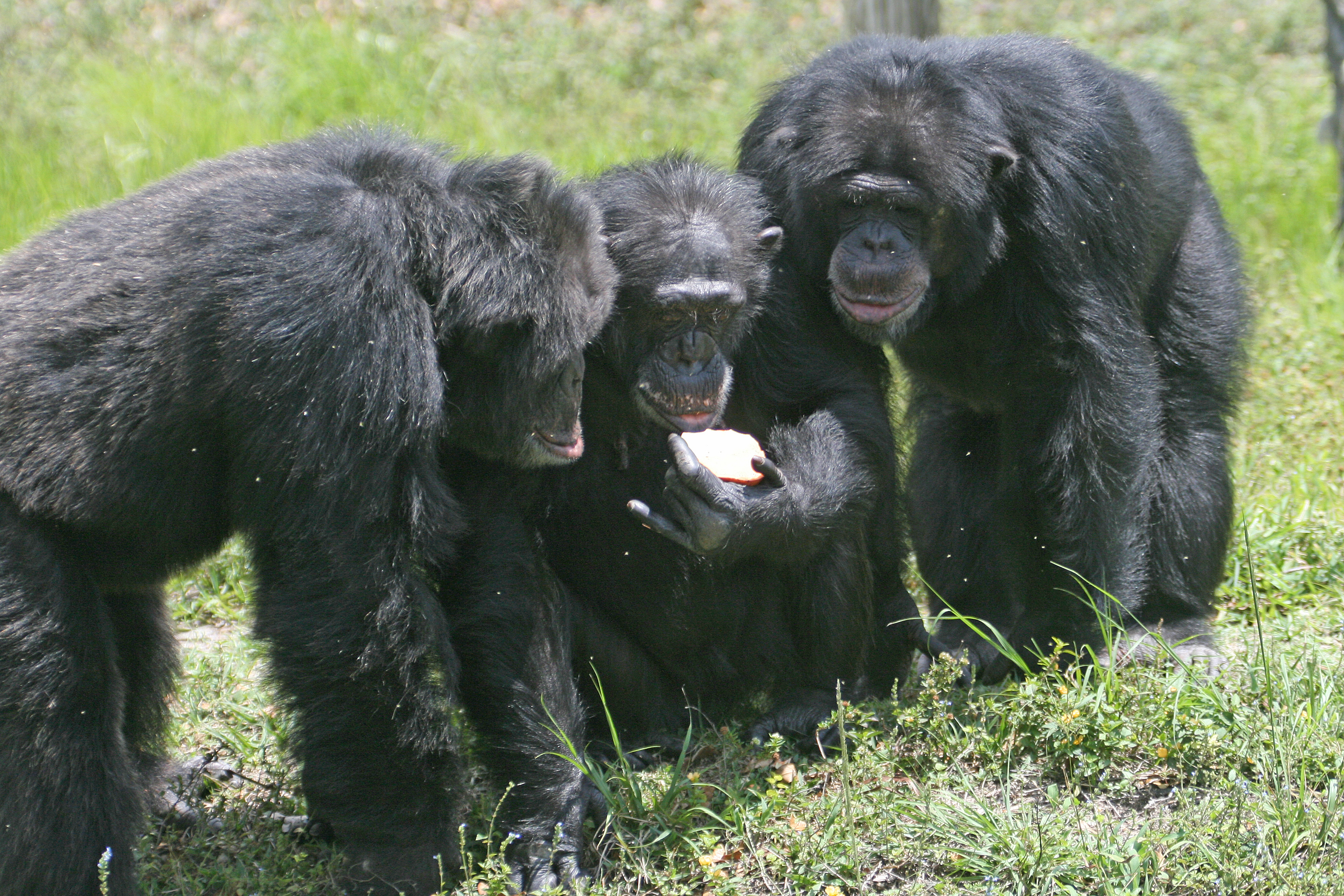
Chimpanzees are social great apes.

Primatologist Jane Goodall, who studied in the Gombe Stream National Park, noted fission-fusion societies in chimpanzees. There is fission when the main group splits up to forage during the day, then fusion when the group returns at night to sleep as a group. This social structure can also be observed in the hamadryas baboon, spider monkeys and the bonobo. The gelada has a similar social structure in which many smaller groups come together to form temporary herds of up to 600 monkeys. Humans also form fission-fusion societies. In hunter-gatherer societies, humans form groups which are made up of several individuals that may split up to obtain different resources.

These social systems are affected by three main ecological factors: distribution of resources, group size, and predation. Within a social group there is a balance between cooperation and competition. Cooperative behaviors in many primates species include social grooming (removing skin parasites and cleaning wounds), food sharing, and collective defense against predators or of a territory. Aggressive behaviors often signal competition for food, sleeping sites or mates. Aggression is also used in establishing dominance hierarchies.

In November 2023, scientists reported, for the first time, evidence that groups of primates, particularly bonobos, are capable of cooperating with each other.

=== Interspecific associations ===
Several species of primates are known to associate in the wild. Some of these associations have been extensively studied. In the Tai Forest of Africa, several species coordinate anti-predator behavior. These include the Diana monkey, Campbell's mona monkey, lesser spot-nosed monkey, western red colobus, king colobus (western black and white colobus), and sooty mangabey, which coordinate anti-predator alarm calls. Among the predators of these monkeys is the common chimpanzee.

The red-tailed monkey associates with several species, including the western red colobus, blue monkey, Wolf's mona monkey, mantled guereza, black crested mangabey and Allen's swamp monkey. Several of these species are preyed upon by the common chimpanzee.

In South America, squirrel monkeys associate with capuchin monkeys. This may have more to do with foraging benefits to the squirrel monkeys than anti-predation benefits.

=== Mating systems ===
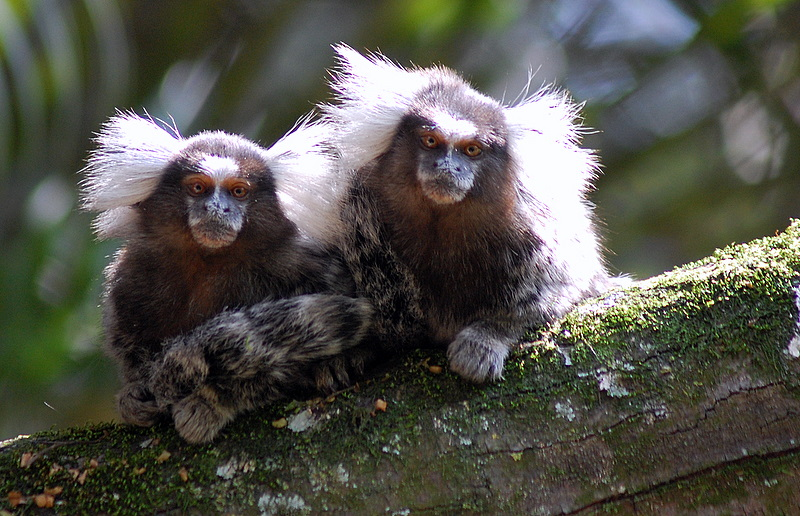
Two common marmosets, the species lives in monogamous pairs

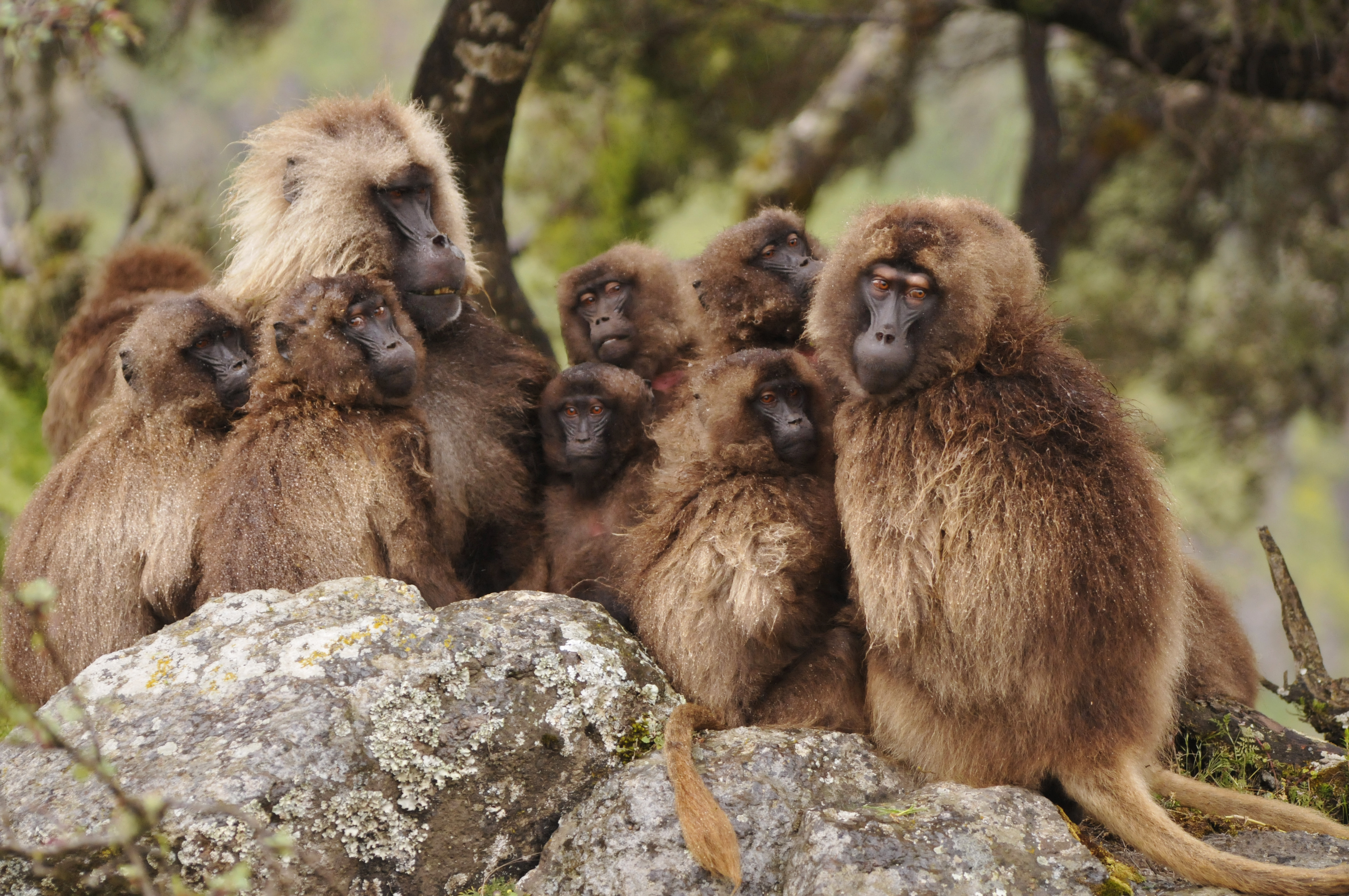
Gelada harem: one male and multiple females

The mating systems of primates vary between monogamy, polyandry, polygyny and polygynandry. In monogamous species, adult males and females form long-lasting pair bonds. Compared to other systems, there is little competition for mating rights and males and females tend to be similar in size. Polyandry, which involves groups consisting of single females mating with multiple males, may arise as a secondary mating system in monogamous species. In the brown-mantled tamarin, a female may breed with one or two males. Polyandry may have developed due to the high frequency of twin births, which require more help in raising.

Polygynous species include gorillas, Hanuman langurs, geladas, hamadryas baboons, proboscis monkeys, and golden snub-nosed monkeys, where one male mates with multiple females within a harem or one-male unit. Sexual dimorphism tends to be higher in these species and males may also develop prominent secondary sex characteristics. In the patriarchal hamadryas baboon, the males aggressively herd females into their groups and violently discipline those that wander. By contrast, in gelada society, which is based on female kinship, a male is dependent on the support of the females in his unit and cannot impose on them. Polygynous males must defend their harems from rivals, who may try to take over.

In some species, such as ring-tailed lemurs, sifakas, macaques, most baboons, mangabeys, squirrel monkeys, woolly monkeys, spider monkeys, woolly spider monkeys, chimpanzees and bonobos, both males and females mate with multiple partners. Polygynandry occurs in multimale-multifemale groups, and since females mate many times before conception, males have large testicles for sperm competition. Males may exist in a dominance hierarchy and those at the top will try to monopolize access to the females. Consortships may occur in some species but these are short-term. In solitary-living species, males and females mate with partners whose home ranges they overlap with. This is known as a 'dispersed' mating system.

Genetic evidence indicates that humans were predominantly polygynous for most of their existence as a species, but that this began to shift during the Neolithic, when monogamy started becoming widespread concomitantly with the transition from nomadic to sedentary societies. Most modern human societies consist of monogamous marriages, but allow for polygyny, particularly for those of a high status.

=== Sexual behavior ===
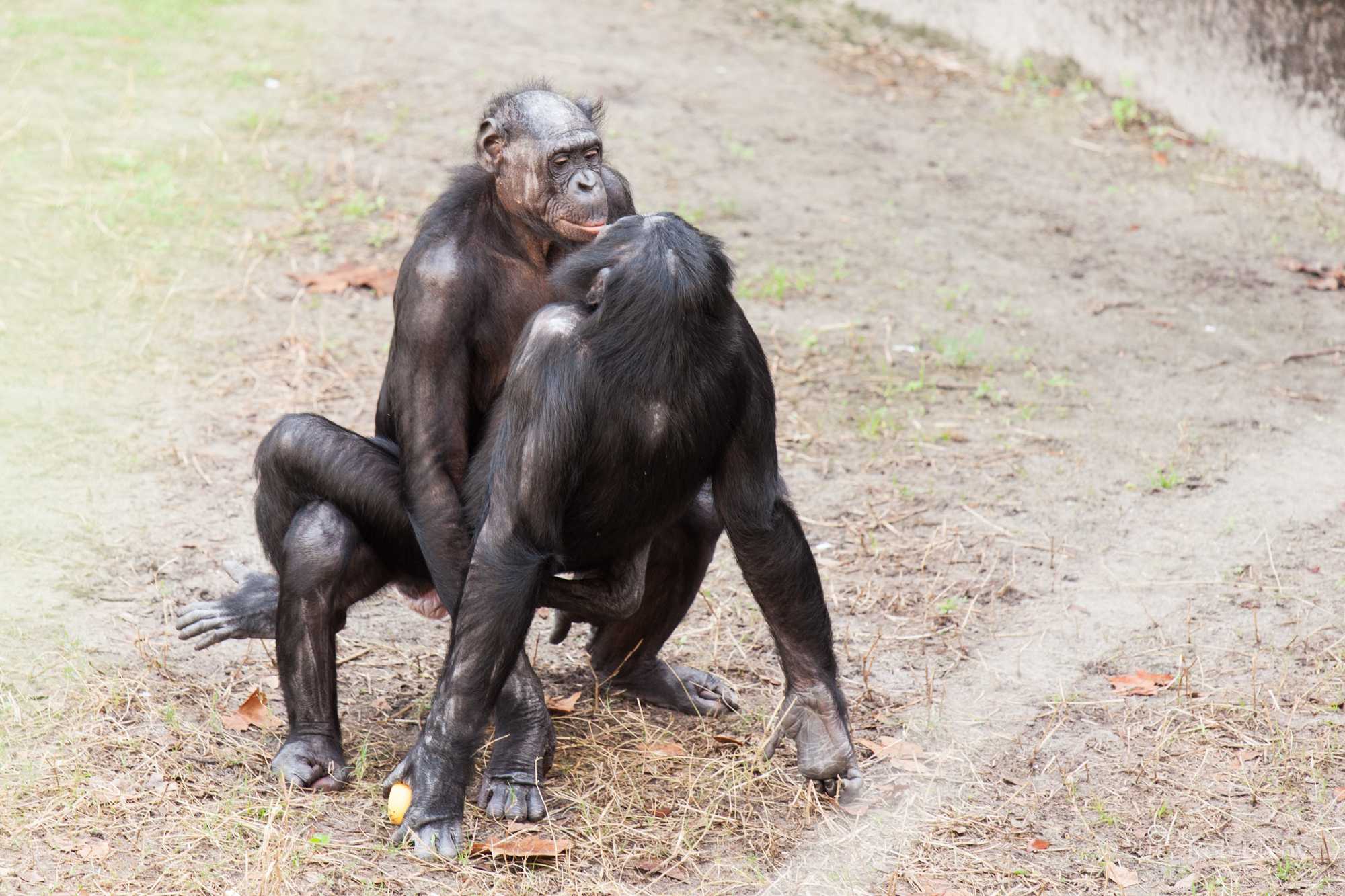
Bonobos mating, Jacksonville Zoo and Gardens

Female primates may signal to the male their receptiveness though various displays including eye-contact, tongue-clicking and presenting of the rump. Female lemurs, lorises and galagos will position themselves in the lordosis pose while female chimpanzees, bonobos and some Old World monkeys develop sexual swellings on the rump. Copulation in primates typically involves the males mounting the females from behind, as with most mammals. Belly-to-belly copulation has been recorded in apes, both gibbons and the great apes. Human sex positions are modifications of these two positions.

Primates may engage in sexual activity as part of social bonding; including homosexual behaviour. Such behavior play an important role in bonobo society in particular. female bonobos engage in mutual genital-rubbing behavior, possibly to bond socially with each other, thus forming a female nucleus of bonobo society. The bonding among females enables them to dominate most of the males.

=== Life history ===
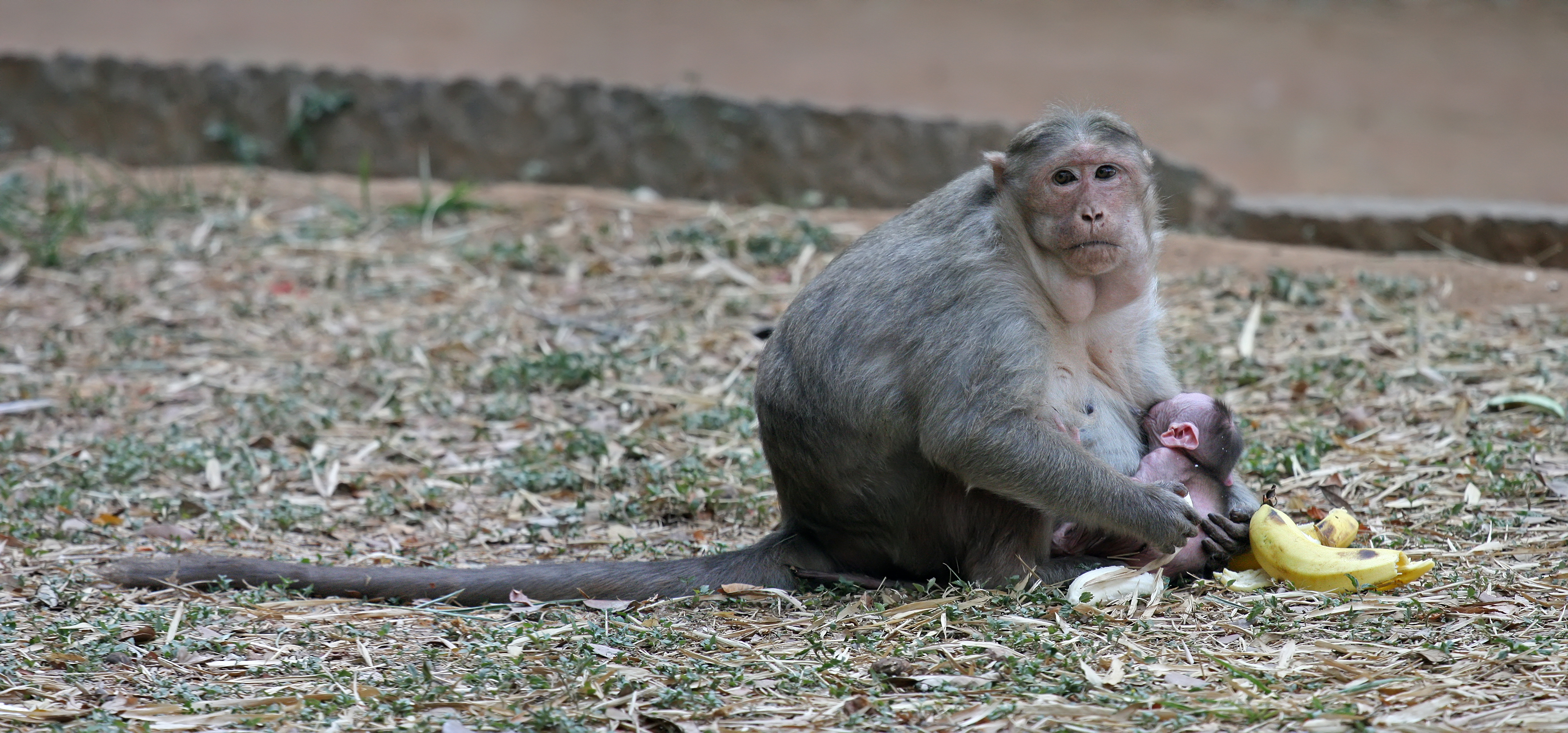
A crab-eating macaque breastfeeding her baby

Primates have slower rates of development than other mammals. All primate infants are breastfed by their mothers (with the exception of some human cultures and various zoo raised primates which are fed formula) and rely on them for grooming and transportation. In some species, infants are protected and transported by males in the group, particularly males who may be their fathers. Other relatives of the infant, such as siblings and aunts, may participate in its care as well. Most primate mothers cease ovulation while breastfeeding an infant; once the infant is weaned the mother can reproduce again. This often leads to weaning conflict with infants who attempt to continue breastfeeding. Primates have a longer juvenile period between weaning and sexual maturity than other mammals of similar size.

Infanticide is common in polygynous species such as gray langurs and gorillas. Adult males may kill dependent offspring that are not theirs so the female will return to estrus and thus they can sire offspring of their own. Social monogamy in some species may have evolved to combat this behavior. Polygynandry may also lessen the risk of infanticide since paternity becomes uncertain.

Some primates such as galagos and New World monkeys use tree-holes for nesting, and park juveniles in leafy patches while foraging. Other primates follow a strategy of "riding", i.e. carrying individuals on the body while feeding. Adults may construct or use nesting sites, sometimes accompanied by juveniles, for the purpose of resting, a behavior which has developed secondarily in the great apes. During the juvenile period, primates are more susceptible than adults to predation and starvation; they gain experience in feeding and avoiding predators during this time. They learn social and fighting skills, often through playing. Primates, especially females, have longer lifespans than other similarly sized mammals, this may be partially due to their slower metabolisms. Late in life, female catarrhine primates appear to undergo a cessation of reproductive function known as menopause; other groups are less studied.

=== Diet and feeding ===
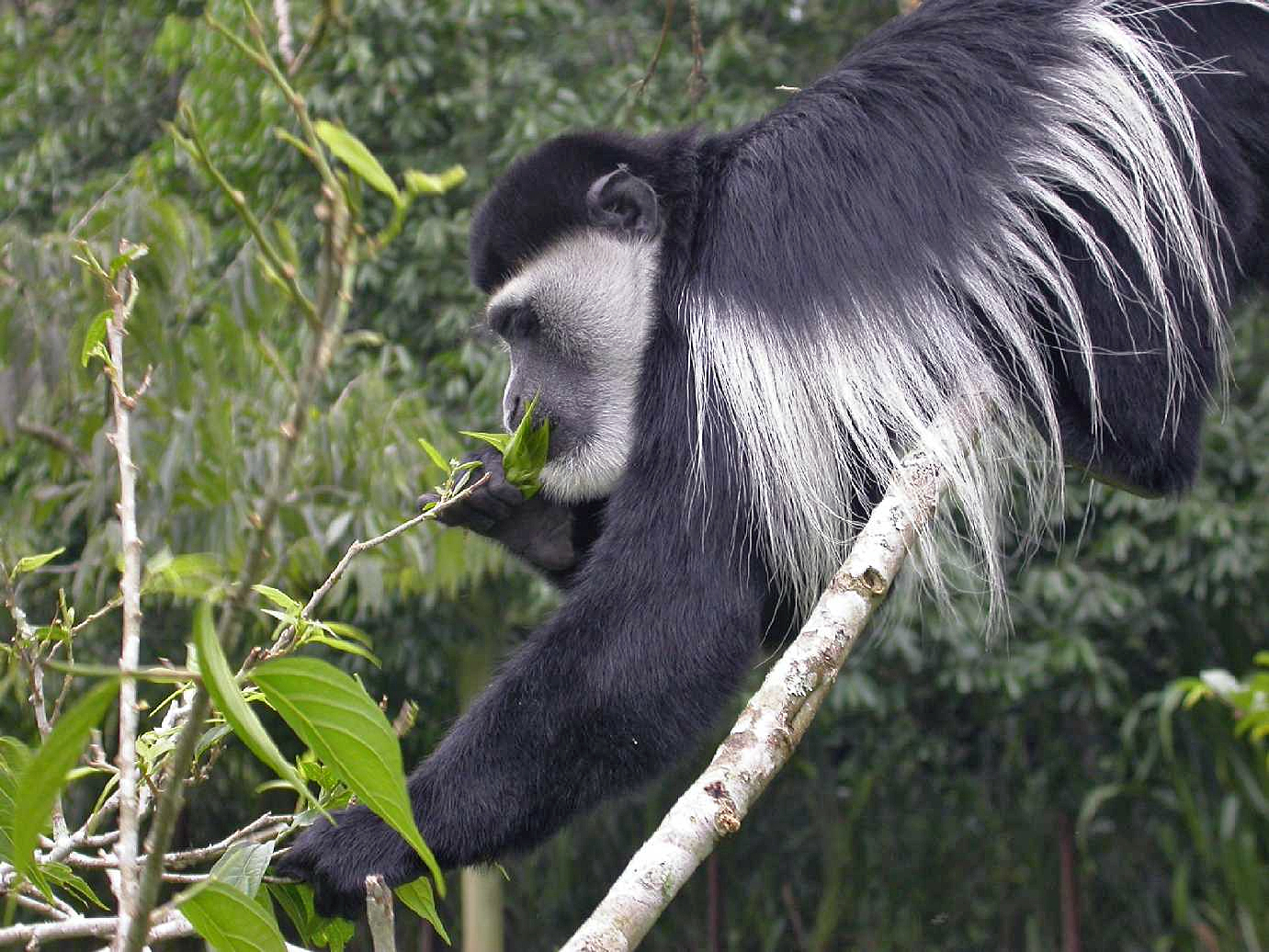
Leaf eating mantled guereza

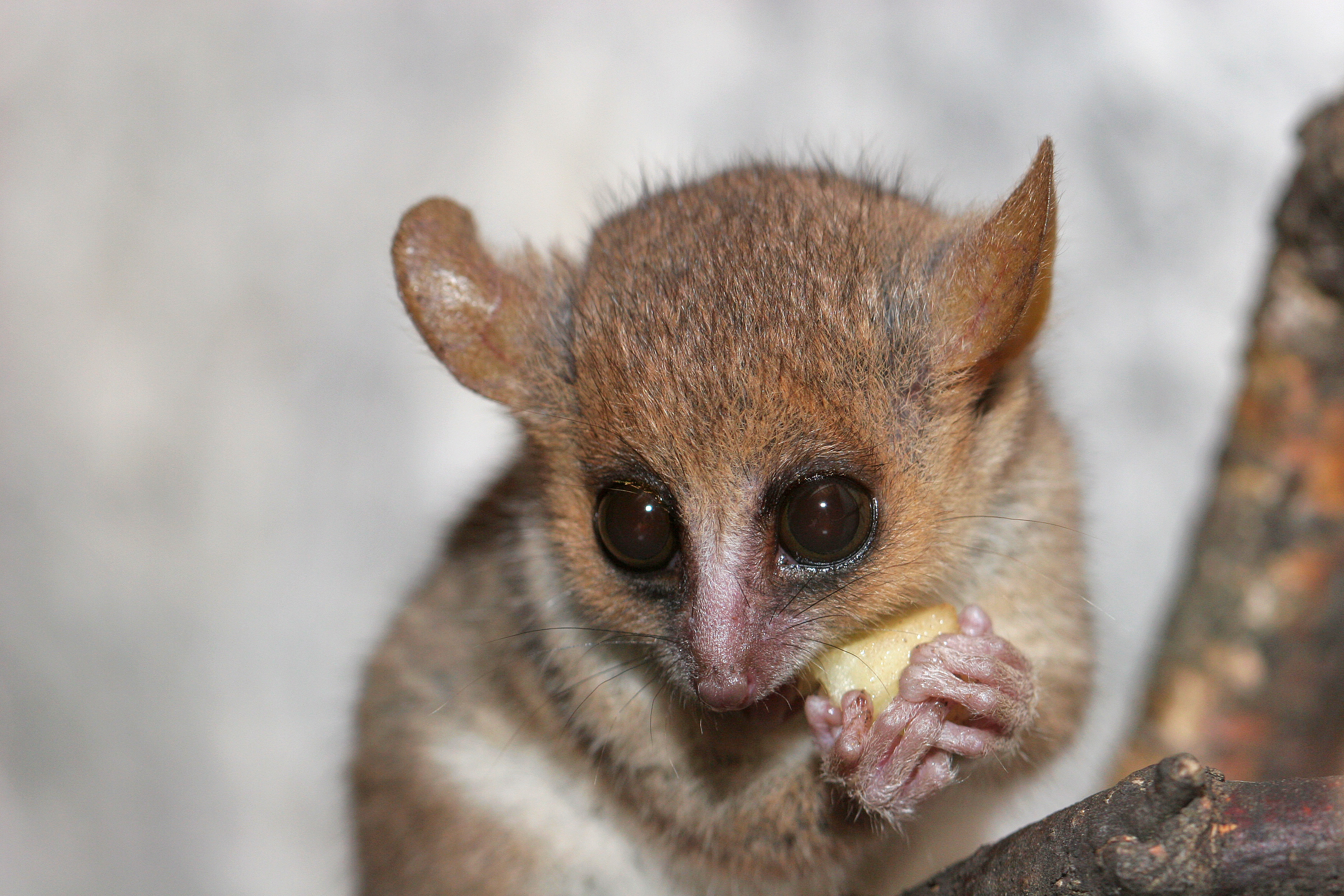
A mouse lemur eating fruit

Primates exploit a variety of food sources. It has been said that many characteristics of modern primates, including humans, derive from an early ancestor's practice of taking most of its food from the tropical canopy. Most primates include fruit in their diets to obtain easily digested nutrients including carbohydrates and lipids for energy. Primates in the suborder Strepsirrhini (non-tarsier prosimians) are able to synthesize vitamin C, like most other mammals, while primates of the suborder Haplorhini (tarsiers, monkeys and apes) have lost this ability, and require the vitamin in their diet.

Many primates have anatomical specializations that enable them to exploit particular foods, such as fruit, leaves, gum or insects. For example, leaf eaters such as howler monkeys, black-and-white colobuses and sportive lemurs have extended digestive tracts which enable them to absorb nutrients from leaves that can be difficult to digest. Marmosets, which are gum eaters, have strong incisor teeth, enabling them to open tree bark to get to the gum, and claws rather than nails, enabling them to cling to trees while feeding. The aye-aye combines rodent-like teeth with a long, thin middle finger to fill the same ecological niche as a woodpecker. It taps on trees to find insect larvae, then gnaws holes in the wood and inserts its elongated middle finger to pull the larvae out. Some species have additional specializations. For example, the grey-cheeked mangabey has thick enamel on its teeth, enabling it to open hard fruits and seeds that other monkeys cannot. The gelada is the only primate species that feeds primarily on grass.

==== Hunting ====
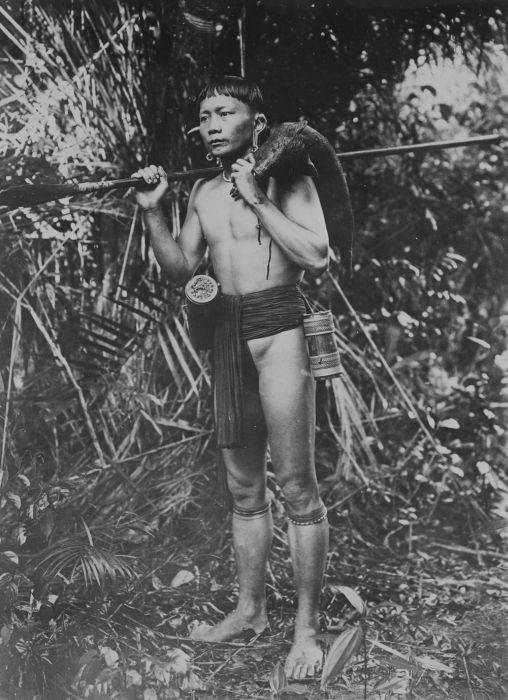
Humans have traditionally hunted prey for subsistence.

Tarsiers are the only extant obligate carnivorous primates, exclusively eating insects, crustaceans, small vertebrates and snakes (including venomous species). Capuchin monkeys can exploit many different types of plant matter, including fruit, leaves, flowers, buds, nectar and seeds, but also eat insects and other invertebrates, bird eggs, and small vertebrates such as birds, lizards, squirrels and bats.

The common chimpanzee eats an omnivorous frugivorous diet. It prefers fruit above all other food items and even seeks out and eats them when they are not abundant. It also eats leaves and leaf buds, seeds, blossoms, stems, pith, bark and resin. Insects and meat make up a small proportion of their diet, estimated as 2%. The meat consumption includes predation on other primate species, such as the western red colobus monkey. The bonobo is an omnivorous frugivore – the majority of its diet is fruit, but it supplements this with leaves, meat from small vertebrates, such as anomalures, flying squirrels and duikers, and invertebrates. In some instances, bonobos have been shown to consume lower-order primates.

Until the development of agriculture approximately 10,000 years ago, Homo sapiens employed a hunter-gatherer method as their sole means of food collection. This involved combining stationary food sources (such as fruits, grains, tubers, and mushrooms, insect larvae and aquatic mollusks) with wild game, which must be hunted and killed in order to be consumed. It has been proposed that humans have used fire to prepare and cook food since the time of Homo erectus. Around ten thousand years ago, humans developed agriculture, which substantially altered their diet. This change in diet may also have altered human biology; with the spread of dairy farming providing a new and rich source of food, leading to the evolution of the ability to digest lactose in some adults.

=== As prey ===
Predators of primates include various species of carnivorans, birds of prey, reptiles, and other primates. Even gorillas have been recorded as prey. Predators of primates have diverse hunting strategies and as such, primates have evolved several different antipredator adaptations including crypsis, alarm calls and mobbing. Several species have separate alarm calls for different predators such as air-borne or ground-dwelling predators. Predation may have shaped group size in primates as species exposed to higher predation pressures appear to live in larger groups.

=== Communication ===
Indri lemur wailing
Indri lemur wailing, ogg/Vorbis format.

Howler monkey roaring
Howler monkey roaring, ogg/Vorbis format.

Vervet monkey alarm call
Vervet monkey alarm call, ogg/Vorbis format.

Siamang singing
Siamang singing, ogg/Vorbis format.

Communication can be affected by several different factors including sex, age, size, social role, and even habitat. In different environments, calls need to have a different amount of power in order to travel great distances or push through varying thickness of brush. Discrete signal systems may occur in locations with closed habitats like dense forests. The vocalizations evolved to take place in these habitats are intended to travel long distances without misunderstanding due to a lack of visual cues from facial structures. In juxtaposition, graded signal systems occur in more open habitats with continuous acoustic variation where “face-to-face” interactions are more likely to assist in the communication. Body size also impacts the range of vocalizations, when a species is larger, its vocal tract will have a positive correlation with its acoustic parameters. This would greatly affect species with intense sexual dimorphism, as males are larger in the species, they may not be able to produce the higher pitched shrills or calls the females produce.

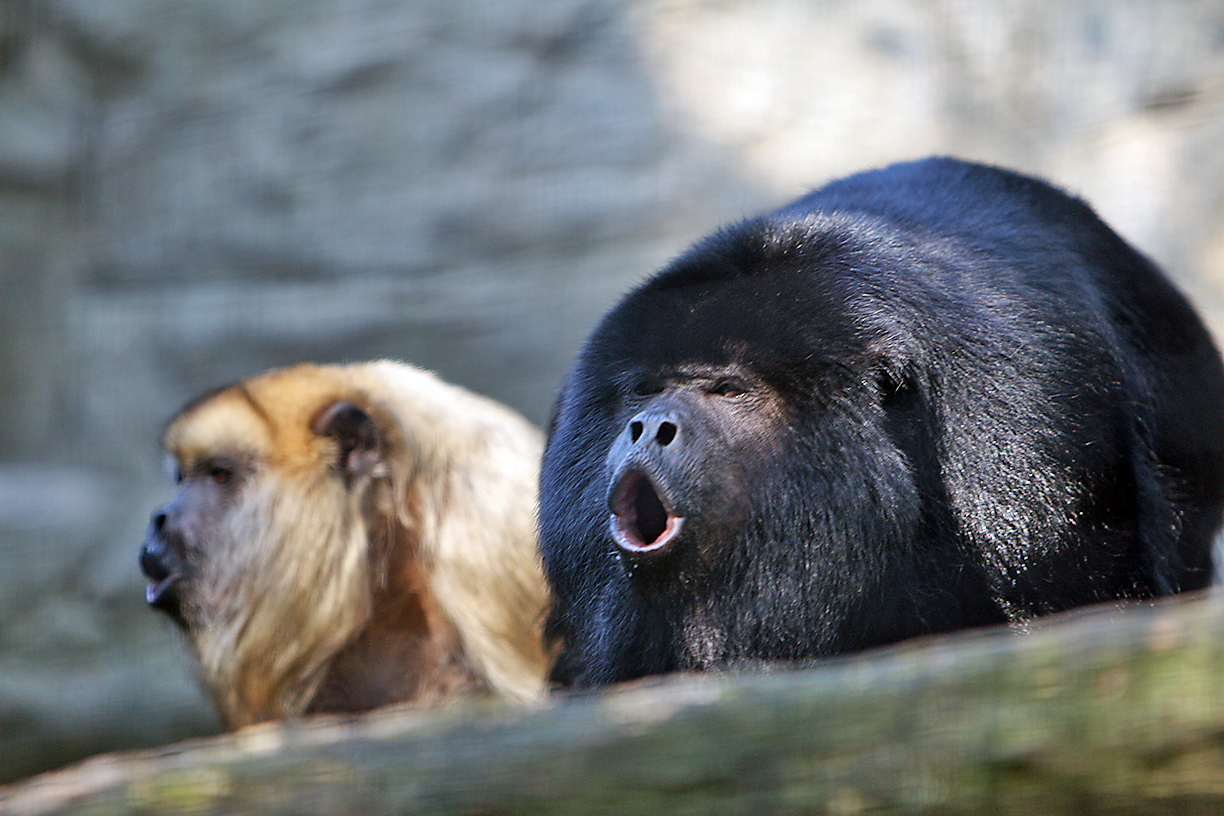
A pair of black howler monkeys vocalizing

Lemurs, lorises, tarsiers, and New World monkeys rely on olfactory signals for many aspects of social and reproductive behavior. Specialized glands are used to mark territories with pheromones, which are detected by the vomeronasal organ; this process forms a large part of the communication behavior of these primates. In Old World monkeys and apes this ability is mostly vestigial, having regressed as trichromatic eyes evolved to become the main sensory organ. Primates also use vocalizations, gestures, and facial expressions to convey psychological state. Facial musculature is very developed in primates, particularly in monkeys and apes, allowing for complex facial communication. Like humans, chimpanzees can distinguish the faces of familiar and unfamiliar individuals. Hand and arm gestures are also important forms of communication for great apes and a single gesture can have multiple functions. Chest-beating in male gorillas is a form of visual and non-vocal sound communication that serves to show fitness to both rivals and females.

Primates are a particularly vocal group of mammals. Indris and black-and-white ruffed lemurs make distinctive, loud songs and choruses which maintain territories and act as alarm calls. The Philippine tarsier, has a high-frequency limit of auditory sensitivity of approximately 91 kHz with a dominant frequency of 70 kHz, among the highest recorded for any terrestrial mammal. For Philippine tarsiers, these ultrasonic vocalizations might represent a private channel of communication that subverts detection by predators, prey and competitors, enhances energetic efficiency, or improves detection against low-frequency background noise. Male howler monkeys are among the loudest land mammals as their roars can be heard up to 4.8 km (3.0 mi), and relate to intergroup spacing, territorial protection and possibly mate-guarding. Male and female siamangs both possess inflatable pouches in the throat with which pair -bonds use to sing "duets" to each other. The vervet monkey gives a distinct alarm call for each of at least four different predators, and the reactions of other monkeys vary according to the call. Furthermore, many primate species including chimpanzees, Campbell's mona monkeys or Diana monkeys have been shown to combine vocalizations in sequences, suggesting syntax may not be uniquely humans as previously thought but rather evolutionary ancient, and its origins may be deeply rooted in the primate lineage.

Consonant- and vowel-like sounds exist in some orangutan calls and they maintain their meaning over great distances. The time range for the evolution of human language and/or its anatomical prerequisites extends, at least in principle, from the phylogenetic divergence of Homo (2.3 to 2.4 million years ago) from Pan (5 to 6 million years ago) to the emergence of full behavioral modernity some 50,000–150,000 years ago. Few dispute that Australopithecus probably lacked vocal communication significantly more sophisticated than that of great apes in general.

=== Intelligence and cognition ===
Primates have advanced cognitive abilities: some make tools and use them to acquire food and for social displays; some can perform tasks requiring cooperation, influence and rank; they are status conscious, manipulative and capable of deception; they can recognise kin and conspecifics; and they can learn to use symbols and understand aspects of human language including some relational syntax and concepts of number and numerical sequence. Research in primate cognition explores problem solving, memory, social interaction, a theory of mind, and numerical, spatial, and abstract concepts. Comparative studies show a trend towards higher intelligence going from prosimians to New World monkeys to Old World monkeys, and significantly higher average cognitive abilities in the great apes. However, there is a great deal of variation in each group (e.g., among New World monkeys, both spider and capuchin monkeys have scored highly by some measures), as well as in the results of different studies.

==== Tool use and manufacture by non-human primates ====
Chimpanzees using twigs to dip for ants

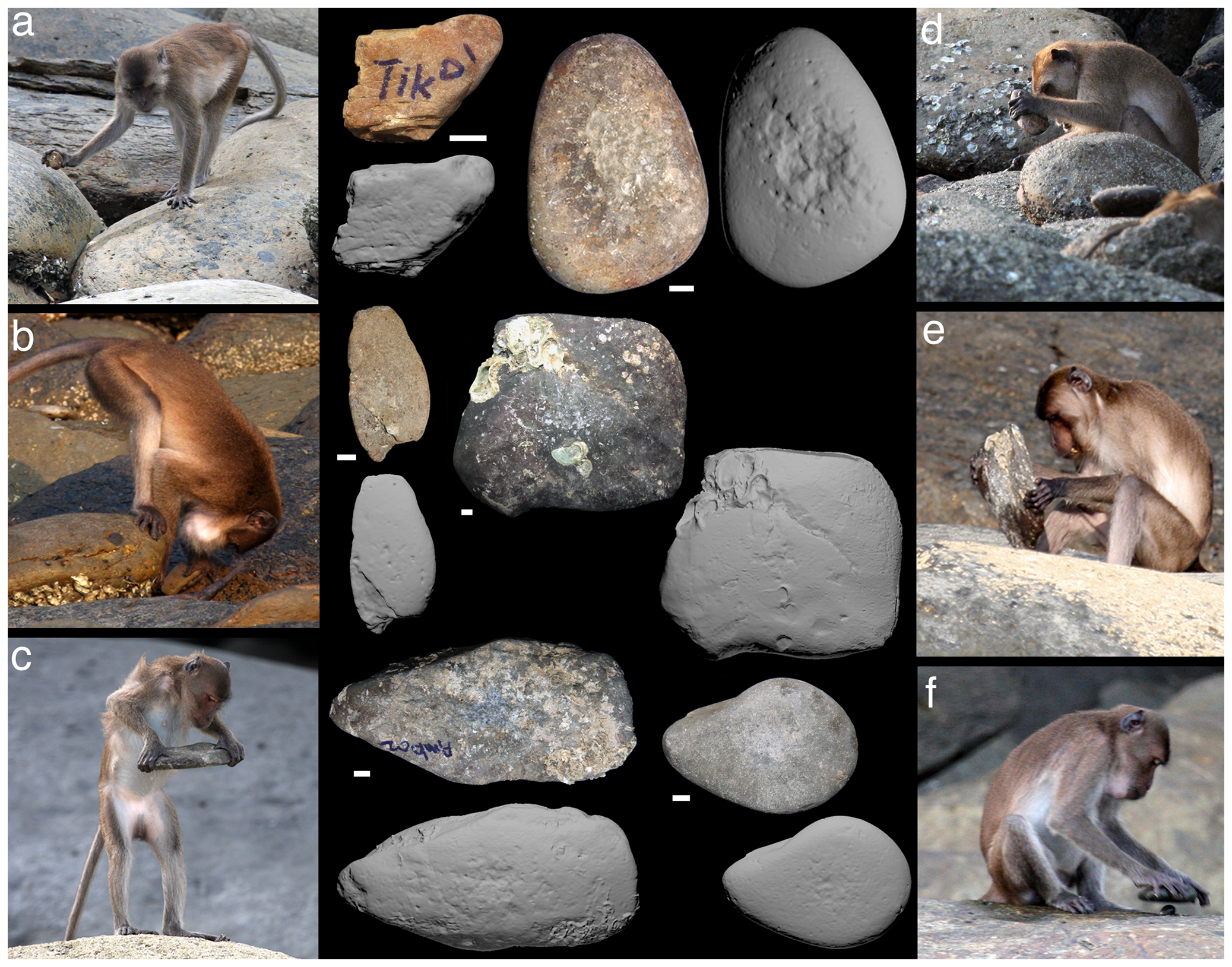
Crab-eating macaques with stone tools

In 1960, Jane Goodall observed a chimpanzee poking pieces of grass into a termite mound and then raising the grass to his mouth. After he left, Goodall approached the mound and repeated the behaviour because she was unsure what the chimpanzee was doing. She found that the termites bit onto the grass with their jaws. The chimpanzee had been using the grass as a tool to "fish" or "dip" for termites. There are more limited reports of the closely related bonobo using tools in the wild; it has been claimed they rarely use tools in the wild although they use tools as readily as chimpanzees when in captivity. It has been reported that females, both chimpanzee and bonobo, use tools more avidly than males. Orangutans in Borneo scoop catfish out of small ponds. Over two years, anthropologist Anne Russon observed orangutans learning to jab sticks at catfish to scare them out of the ponds and in to their waiting hands. There are few reports of gorillas using tools in the wild. An adult female western lowland gorilla used a branch as a walking stick apparently to test water depth and to aid her in crossing a pool of water. Another adult female used a detached trunk from a small shrub as a stabilizer during food gathering, and another used a log as a bridge.

Soon after her initial discovery of tool use, Goodall observed other chimpanzees picking up leafy twigs, stripping off the leaves and using the stems to fish for insects. This change of a leafy twig into a tool was a major discovery. Prior to this, scientists thought that only humans manufactured and used tools, and that this ability was what separated humans from other animals. Chimpanzees have also been observed making "sponges" out of leaves and moss that suck up water. Sumatran orangutans have been observed making and using tools. They will break off a tree branch that is about 30 cm long, snap off the twigs, fray one end and then use the stick to dig in tree holes for termites. In the wild, mandrills have been observed to clean their ears with modified tools. Scientists filmed a large male mandrill at Chester Zoo (UK) stripping down a twig, apparently to make it narrower, and then using the modified stick to scrape dirt from underneath its toenails. Captive gorillas have made a variety of tools.

The first direct observation of a non-ape primate using a tool in a wild environment occurred in 1988. Primatologist Sue Boinski watched an adult male white-faced capuchin beat a fer-de-lance snake to death with a dead branch. The black-striped capuchin was the first non-ape primate for which routine tool use was documented in the wild; individuals were observed cracking nuts by placing them on a stone anvil and hitting them with another large stone. In Thailand and Myanmar, crab-eating macaques use stone tools to open nuts, oysters and other bivalves, and various types of sea snails. Chacma baboons use stones as weapons; stoning by these baboons is done from the rocky walls of the canyon where they sleep and retreat to when they are threatened. Stones are lifted with one hand and dropped over the side whereupon they tumble down the side of the cliff or fall directly to the canyon floor.

Although they have not been observed to use tools in the wild, lemurs in controlled settings have been shown to be capable of understanding the functional properties of the objects they had been trained to use as tools, performing as well as tool-using haplorhines.

== Ecology ==
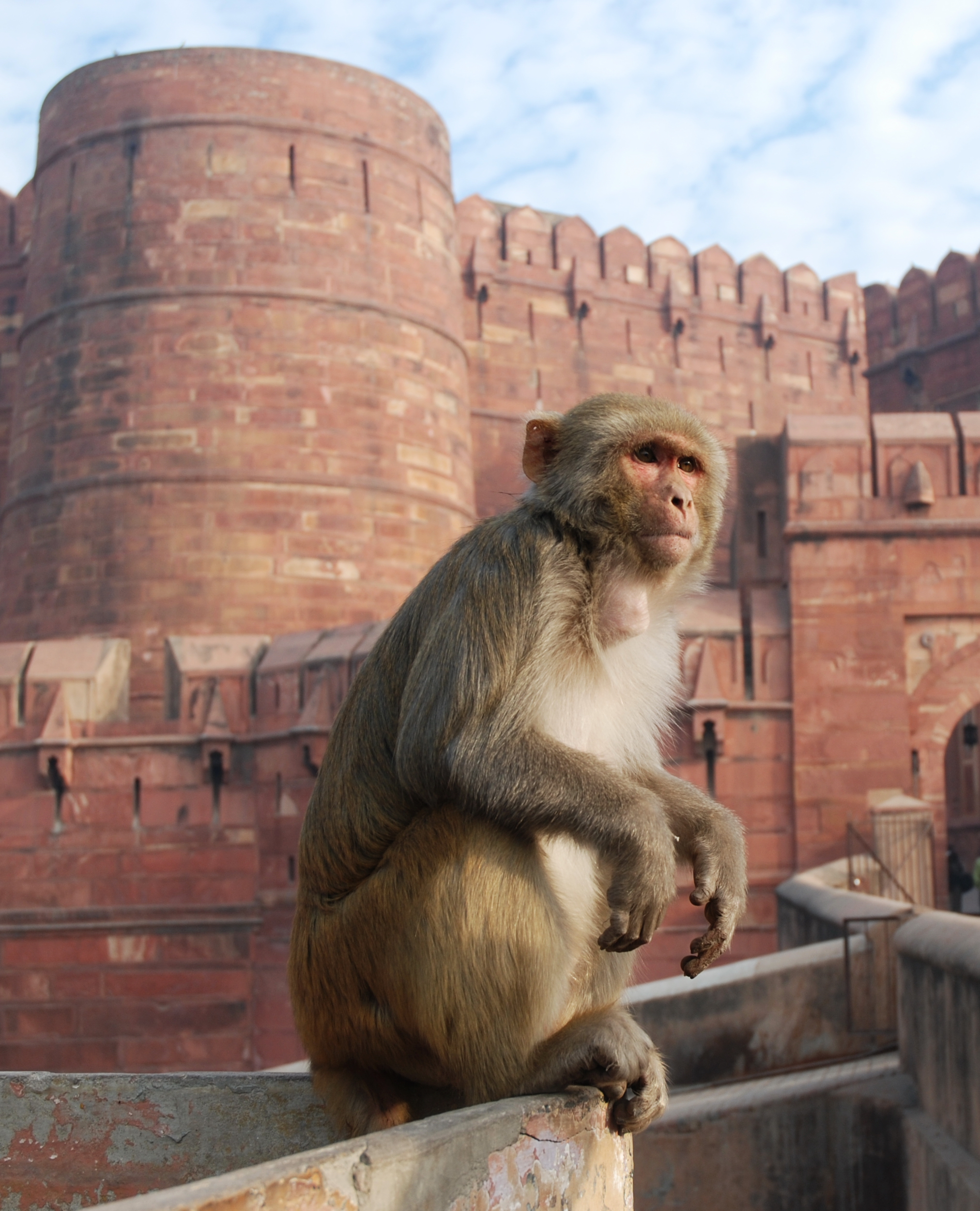
Rhesus macaque at Agra Fort, India

Humans are the most adaptable primate species, despite having a low or narrow tolerance for many of the earth's extreme environments. Currently the species is present in all eight biogeographical realms, although their presence in the Antarctic realm is very limited to research stations and annually there is a population decline in the winter months of this realm.

Non-human primates primarily live in the tropical latitudes of Africa, Asia, and the Americas. Species that live outside of the tropics include the Japanese macaque which lives in the Japanese islands of Honshū and Hokkaido; the Barbary macaque which lives in North Africa and several species of langur which live in China. Primates tend to live in tropical rainforests but are also found in temperate forests, savannas, deserts, mountains and coastal areas. The number of primate species within tropical areas has been shown to be positively correlated to the amount of rainfall and the amount of rain forest area. Accounting for 25% to 40% of the fruit-eating animals (by weight) within tropical rainforests, primates play an important ecological role by dispersing seeds of many tree species.

Primate habitats span a range of altitudes: the black snub-nosed monkey has been found living in the Hengduan Mountains at altitudes of 4,700 meters (15,400 ft), the mountain gorilla can be found at 4,200 meters (13,200 ft) crossing the Virunga Mountains, and the gelada has been found at elevations of up to 4,000 m (13,000 ft) in the Ethiopian Highlands. Some species interact with aquatic environments and may swim or even dive, including the proboscis monkey, De Brazza's monkey and Allen's swamp monkey. Some primates, such as the rhesus macaque and gray langurs, can exploit human-modified environments and even live in cities.

== Interactions between humans and other primates ==
=== Disease transmission ===
Close interactions between humans and non-human primates (NHPs) can create pathways for the transmission of zoonotic diseases. Viruses such as Herpesviridae (most notably Herpes B Virus), Poxviridae, measles, ebola, rabies, the Marburg virus and viral hepatitis can be transmitted to humans; in some cases the viruses produce potentially fatal diseases in both humans and non-human primates.

=== Legal and social status ===
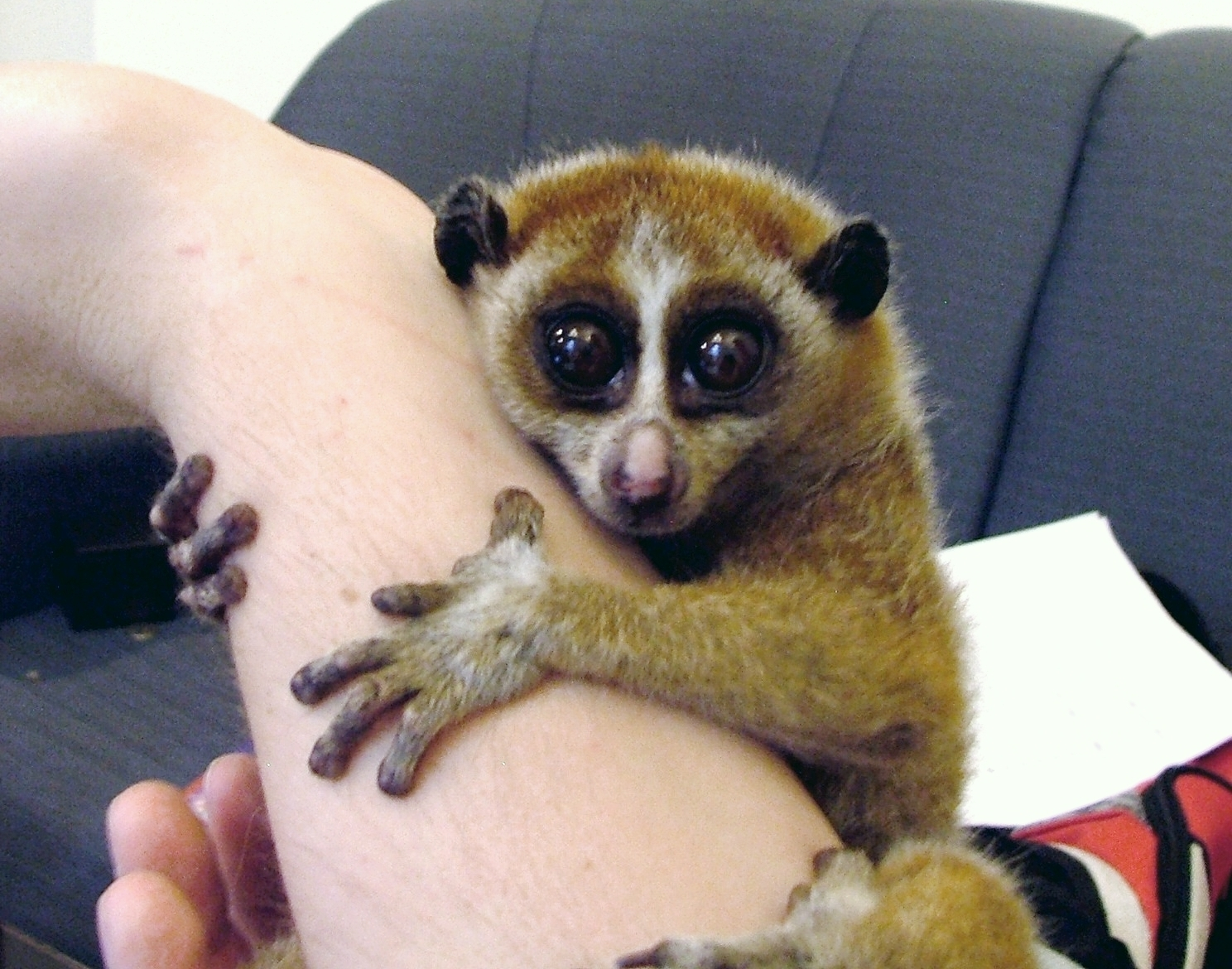
Slow lorises are popular in the exotic pet trade, which threatens wild populations.

Only humans are recognized as persons and protected in law by the United Nations Universal Declaration of Human Rights. (Note: Article 6: Everyone has the right to recognition everywhere as a person before the law.) The legal status of NHPs, on the other hand, is the subject of much debate, with organizations such as the Great Ape Project (GAP) campaigning to award at least some of them legal rights. In June 2008, Spain became the first country in the world to recognize the rights of some NHPs, when its parliament's cross-party environmental committee urged the country to comply with GAP's recommendations, which are that chimpanzees, orangutans and gorillas are not to be used for animal experiments.

Many species of NHP are kept as pets by humans. The Allied Effort to Save Other Primates (AESOP) estimates that around 15,000 NHPs live as exotic pets in the United States. The expanding Chinese middle class has increased demand for NHPs as exotic pets in recent years. Although NHP import for the pet trade was banned in the U.S. in 1975, smuggling still occurs along the United States – Mexico border, with prices ranging from US$3000 for monkeys to $30,000 for apes.

NHPs are kept in zoos around the globe. Historically, zoos were primarily a form of entertainment, but more recently have shifted their focus towards conservation, education and research. GAP does not insist that all NHPs should be released from zoos, primarily because captive-born primates lack the knowledge and experience to survive in the wild if released.

=== Role in scientific research ===
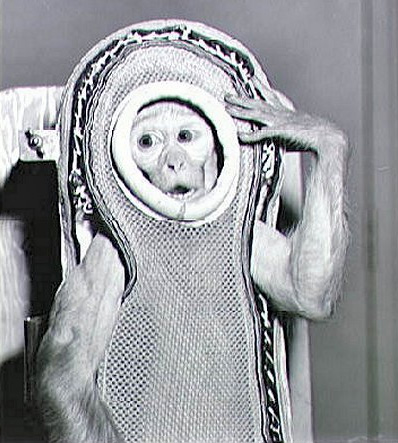
Sam, a rhesus macaque, was flown to the edge of space by NASA in the 1959 Little Joe 2 flight of Project Mercury.

Primates are used as model organisms in laboratories and have been used in space missions. They serve as service animals for disabled humans. Capuchin monkeys can be trained to assist quadriplegic humans; their intelligence, memory, and manual dexterity make them ideal helpers.

Thousands of non-human primates are used around the world in research because of their psychological and physiological similarity to humans. In particular, the brains and eyes of NHPs more closely parallel human anatomy than those of any other animals. NHPs are commonly used in preclinical trials, neuroscience, ophthalmology studies, and toxicity studies. Rhesus macaques are often used, as are other macaques, African green monkeys, chimpanzees, baboons, squirrel monkeys, and marmosets, both wild-caught and purpose-bred.

In 2005, GAP reported that 1,280 of the 3,100 NHPs living in captivity in the United States were used for experiments. In 2004, the European Union used around 10,000 NHPs in such experiments; in 2005 in Great Britain, 4,652 experiments were conducted on 3,115 NHPs. Governments of many nations have strict care requirements of NHPs kept in captivity. In the US, federal guidelines extensively regulate aspects of NHP housing, feeding, enrichment, and breeding. European groups such as the European Coalition to End Animal Experiments are seeking a ban on all NHP use in experiments as part of the European Union's review of animal testing legislation.

=== Extinction threats ===
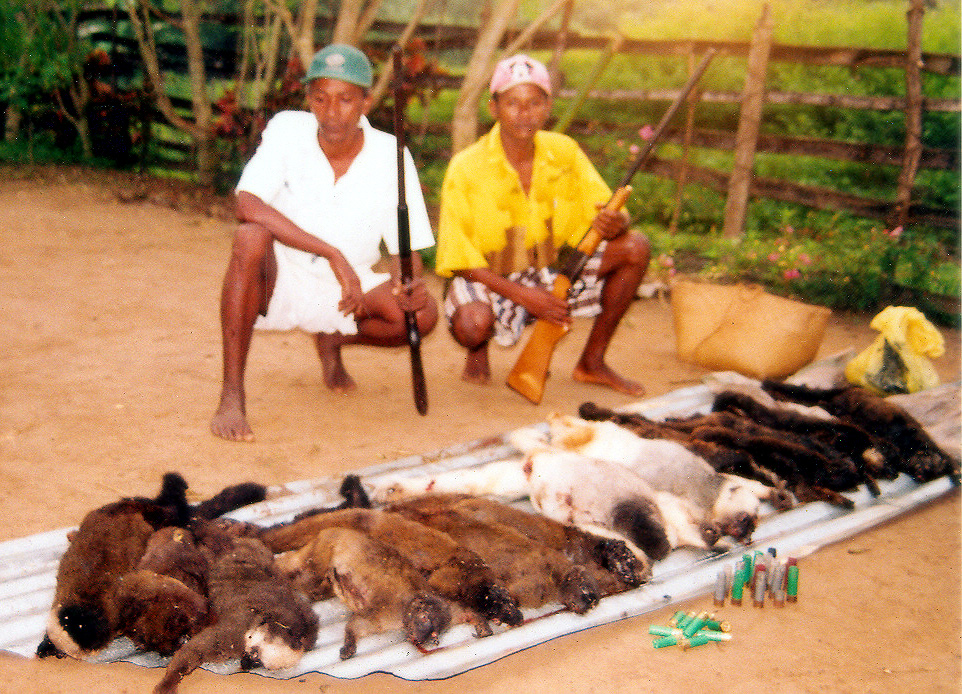
Humans are known to hunt other primates for food, called bushmeat. Pictured are two men who have killed a number of silky sifaka and white-headed brown lemurs.

The International Union for Conservation of Nature (IUCN) lists more than a third of primates as critically endangered or vulnerable. About 60% of primate species are threatened with extinction, including: 87% of species in Madagascar, 73% in Asia, 37% in Africa, and 36% in South and Central America. Additionally, 75% of primate species have decreasing populations. Trade is regulated, as all species are listed by CITES in Appendix II, except 50 species and subspecies listed in Appendix I, which gain full protection from trade.

Common threats to primate species include deforestation, forest fragmentation, monkey drives (resulting from primate crop raiding), and primate hunting for use in medicines, as pets, and for food. Large-scale tropical forest clearing is widely regarded as the process that most threatens primates. More than 90% of primate species occur in tropical forests. The main cause of forest loss is clearing for agriculture, although commercial logging, subsistence harvesting of timber, mining, and dam construction also contribute to tropical forest destruction. In Indonesia large areas of lowland forest have been cleared to increase palm oil production, and one analysis of satellite imagery concluded that during 1998 and 1999 there was a loss of 1,000 Sumatran orangutans per year in the Leuser Ecosystem alone.

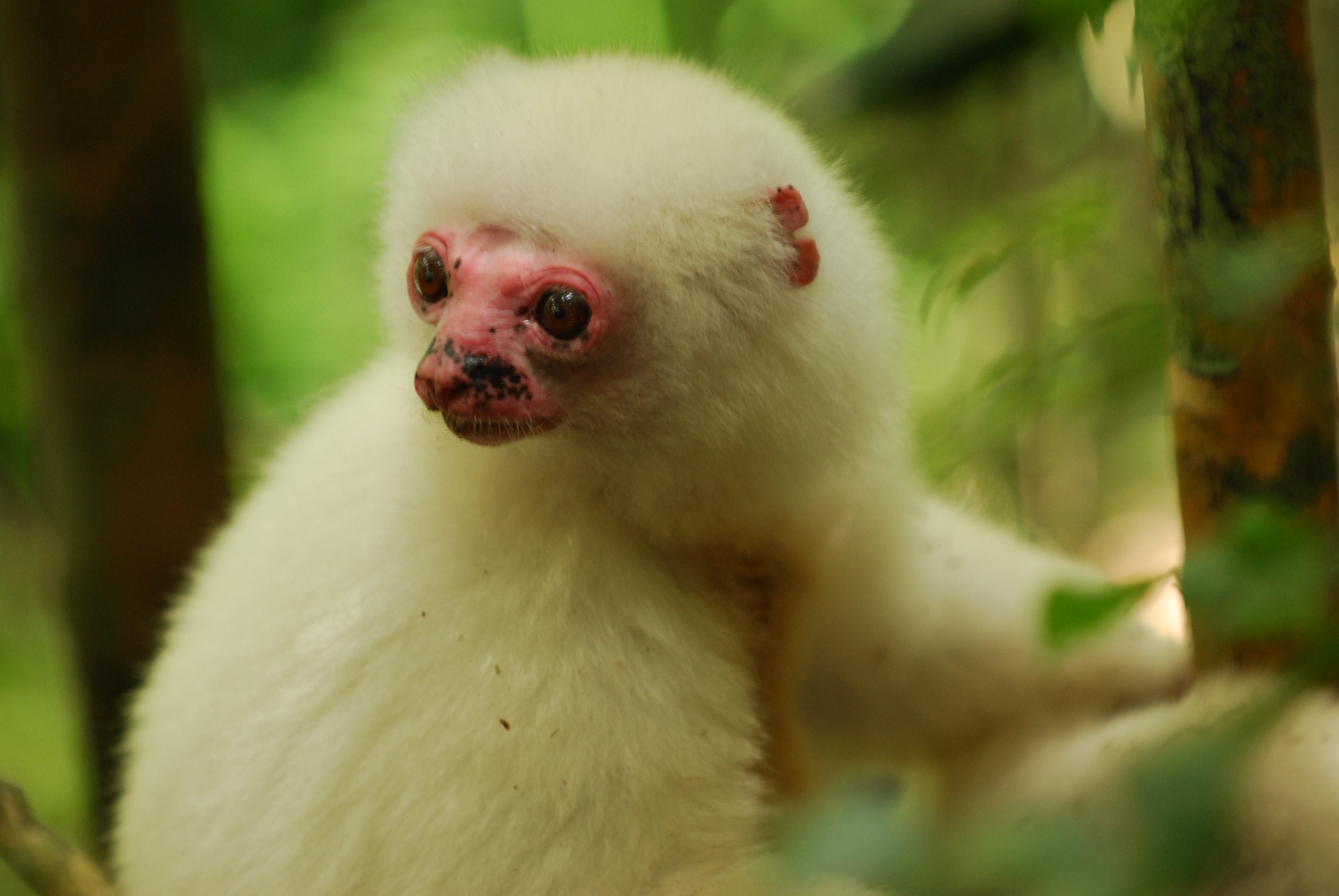
The critically endangered silky sifaka

Primates with a large body size (over 5 kg) are at increased extinction risk due to their greater profitability to poachers compared to smaller primates. They reach sexual maturity later and have a longer period between births. Populations therefore recover more slowly after being depleted by poaching or the pet trade. Data for some African cities show that half of all protein consumed in urban areas comes from the bushmeat trade. Endangered primates such as guenons and the drill are hunted at levels that far exceed sustainable levels. This is due to their large body size, ease of transport and profitability per animal. As farming encroaches on forest habitats, primates feed on the crops, causing the farmers large economic losses. Primate crop raiding gives locals a negative impression of primates, hindering conservation efforts.

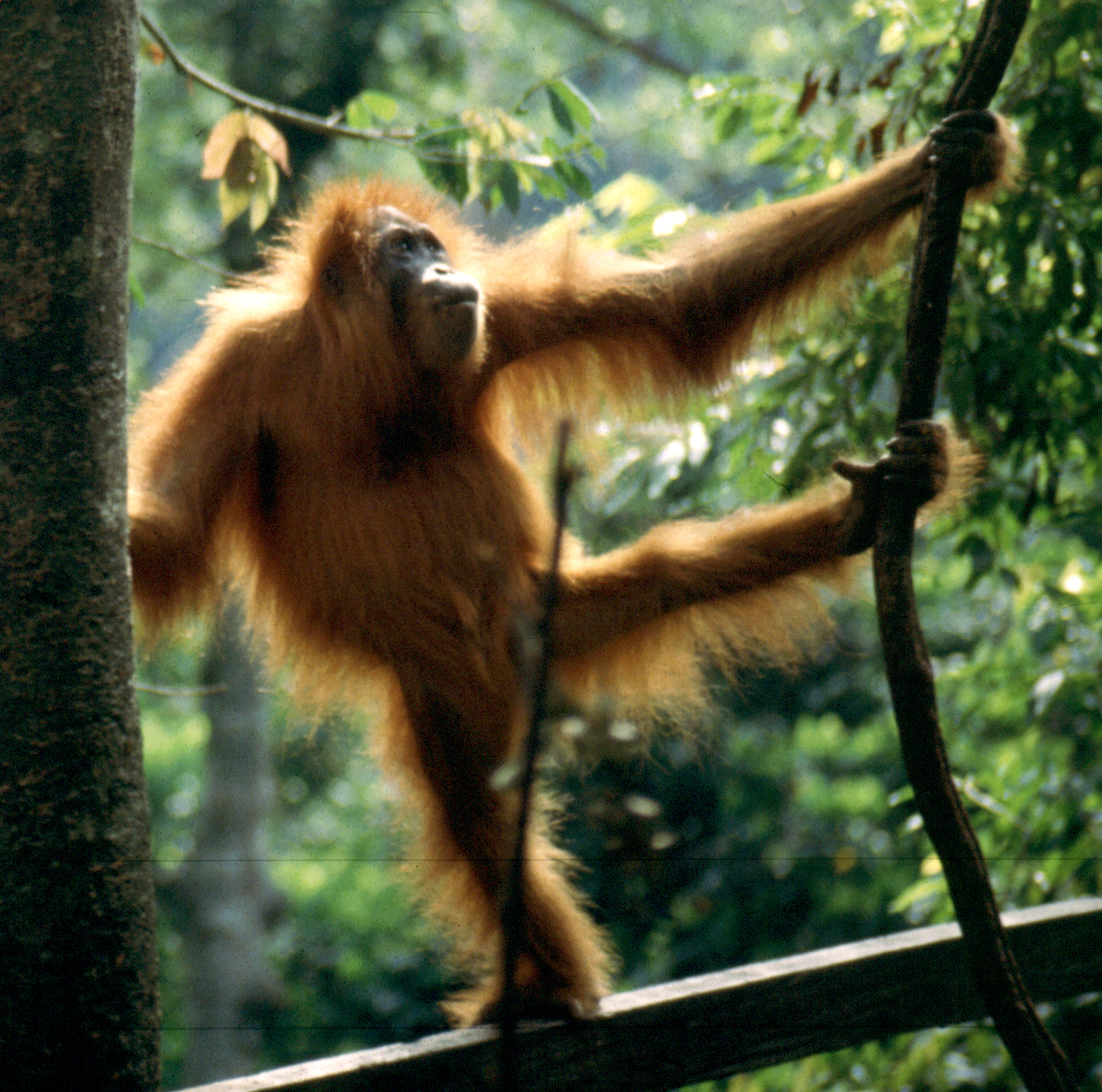
The critically endangered Sumatran orangutan

Madagascar, home to five endemic primate families, has experienced the greatest extinction of the recent past; since human settlement 1,500 years ago, at least eight classes and fifteen of the larger species have become extinct due to hunting and habitat destruction. Among the primates wiped out were Archaeoindris (a lemur larger than a silverback gorilla) and the families Palaeopropithecidae and Archaeolemuridae.

In Asia, Hinduism, Buddhism, and Islam prohibit eating primate meat; however, primates are still hunted for food. Some smaller traditional religions allow the consumption of primate meat. The pet trade and traditional medicine also increase demand for illegal hunting. The rhesus macaque, a model organism, was protected after excessive trapping threatened its numbers in the 1960s; the program was so effective that they are now viewed as a pest throughout their range.

In Central and South America, forest fragmentation and hunting are the two main problems for primates. Large tracts of forest are now rare in Central America. This increases the amount of forest vulnerable to edge effects such as farmland encroachment, lower levels of humidity and a change in plant life. Movement restriction results in a greater amount of inbreeding, which can cause deleterious effects leading to a population bottleneck, whereby a significant percentage of the population is lost.

There are 21 critically endangered primates, seven of which have remained on the IUCN's "The World's 25 Most Endangered Primates" list since the year 2000: the silky sifaka, Delacour's langur, the white-headed langur, the gray-shanked douc, the Tonkin snub-nosed monkey, the Cross River gorilla and the Sumatran orangutan. Miss Waldron's red colobus was recently declared extinct when no trace of the subspecies could be found from 1993 to 1999. A few hunters have found and killed individuals since then, but the subspecies' prospects remain bleak.

== See also ==
- Arboreal theory
- Great Ape Project
- Human evolution
- International Primate Day
- List of primates
- List of fossil primates
- Monkey Day
- Primatology
