= Fontanelle =

Anatomical feature of the infant human skull

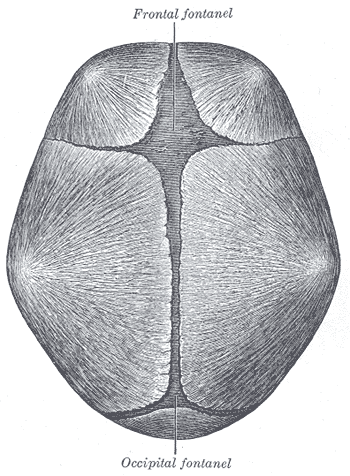
- The skull at birth, showing the anterior and posterior fontanelles

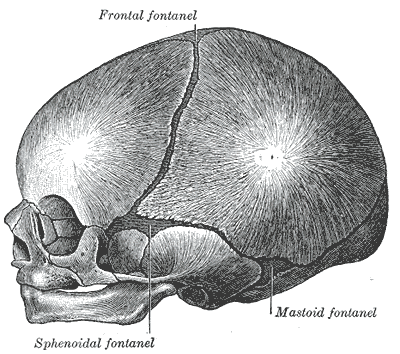
- The skull at birth, showing the lateral fontanelles

Details

Identifiers
- Latin: fonticuli cranii
- MeSH: D055762
- TA98: A02.1.00.027
- TA2: 431
- FMA: 75437

A fontanelle (or fontanel) (colloquially, soft spot) is an anatomical feature of the infant human skull comprising soft membranous gaps (sutures) between the cranial bones that make up the calvaria of a fetus or an infant. Fontanelles allow for stretching and deformation of the neurocranium both during birth and later as the brain expands faster than the surrounding bone can grow. Premature complete ossification of the sutures is called craniosynostosis.

After infancy, the anterior fontanelle is known as the bregma.

== Structure ==
An infant's skull consists of five main bones: two frontal bones, two parietal bones, and one occipital bone. These are joined by fibrous sutures, which allow movement that facilitates childbirth and brain growth.

- Posterior fontanelle is triangle-shaped. It lies at the junction between the sagittal suture and lambdoid suture. At birth, the skull features a small posterior fontanelle with an open area covered by a tough membrane, where the two parietal bones adjoin the occipital bone (at the lambda). The posterior fontanelles ossify within 6–8 weeks after birth. This is called intramembranous ossification. The mesenchymal connective tissue turns into bone tissue.
- Anterior fontanelle is a diamond-shaped membrane-filled space located between the two frontal and two parietal bones of the developing fetal skull. It persists until approximately 18 months after birth. It is at the junction of the coronal suture and sagittal suture. The fetal anterior fontanelle may be palpated until 18 months. In cleidocranial dysostosis, however, it is often late in closing at 8–24 months or may never close. Examination of an infant includes palpating the anterior fontanelle.
- Two smaller fontanelles are located on each side of the head, more anteriorly the sphenoidal or anterolateral fontanelle (between the sphenoid, parietal, temporal, and frontal bones) and more posteriorly the mastoid or posterolateral fontanelle (between the temporal, occipital, and parietal bones).

During birth, fontanelles enable the bony plates of the skull to flex, allowing the child's head to pass through the birth canal. The ossification of the bones of the skull causes the anterior fontanelle to close over by 9 to 18 months. The sphenoidal and posterior fontanelles close during the first few months of life. The closures eventually form the sutures of the neurocranium. Other than the anterior and posterior fontanelles, the mastoid fontanelle and the sphenoidal fontanelle are also significant.

=== Closure ===
In humans, the sequence of fontanelle closure is as follows:

1. The posterior fontanelle generally closes 2 to 3 months after birth;
2. The sphenoidal fontanelle is the next to close around 6 months after birth;
3. The mastoid fontanelle closes next from 6 to 18 months after birth; and
4. The anterior fontanelle is generally the last to close between 12 and 18 months.

== Clinical significance ==
Normal pulsation of the anterior fontanelle in a 4-month-old infant

The fontanelle may pulsate, and although the precise cause of this is not known, it is normal and seems to echo the heartbeat, perhaps via the arterial pulse within the brain vasculature, or in the meninges. This pulsating action is how the soft spot got its name – fontanelle is borrowed from the old French word fontenele, which is a diminutive of fontaine, meaning "spring". It is assumed that the term spring is used because of the analogy of the dent in a rock or earth where a spring arises.

Parents may worry that their infant may be more prone to injury at the fontanelles. In fact, although they may colloquially be called "soft spots", the membrane covering the fontanelles is extremely tough and difficult to penetrate.

Fontanelles allow the infant brain to be imaged using ultrasonography. Once they are closed, most of the brain is inaccessible to ultrasound imaging, because the bony skull presents an acoustic barrier.

== Disorders ==
=== Bulging ===
A very tense or bulging anterior fontanelle indicates raised intracranial pressure. Increased cranial pressure in infants may cause the fontanelles to bulge or the head to begin to enlarge abnormally. It can occur due to:

- Craniosynostosis – premature fusion of the cranial sutures
- Encephalitis – swelling (inflammation) of the brain, most often due to infections
- Hydrocephalus – a buildup of fluid inside the skull
- Meningitis – infection of the membranes covering the brain
- Shaken baby syndrome

=== Sunken ===
A sunken (also called "depressed") fontanelle indicates dehydration or malnutrition.

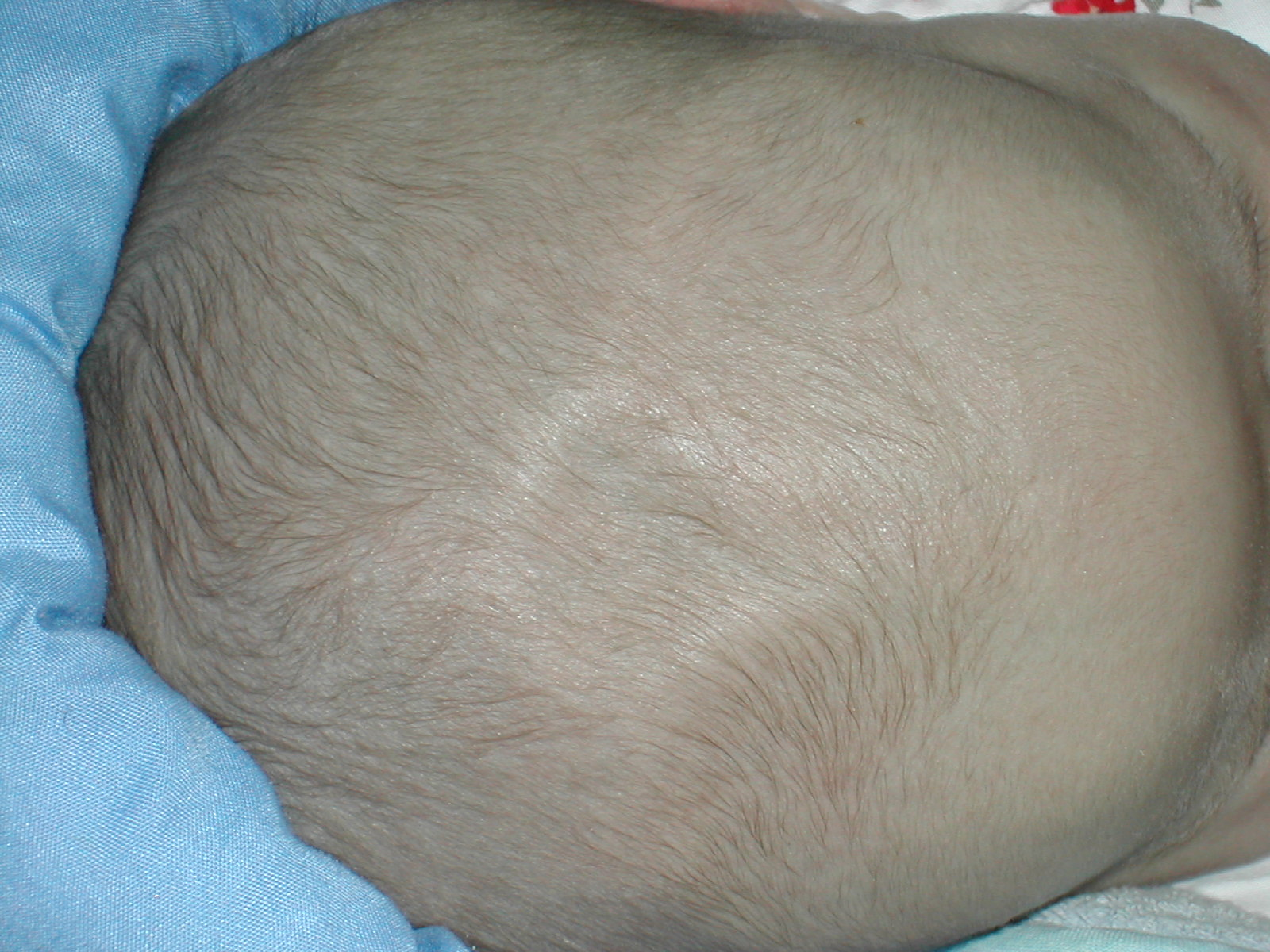
Anterior fontanelle of a 1-month-old infant

=== Enlarged ===
The fontanelles may be enlarged, may be slow to close, or may never close, most commonly due to causes like:

- Down syndrome
- Hydrocephalus
- Intrauterine growth restriction (IUGR)
- Premature birth

Rarer causes include:

- Achondroplasia
- Apert syndrome
- Cleidocranial dysostosis
- Congenital rubella
- Neonatal hypothyroidism
- Osteogenesis imperfecta
- Rickets

=== Third ===
Sometimes there is a third bigger fontanelle other than posterior and anterior ones in a newborn. In one study, the frequency of third fontanelles in an unselected population of newborn infants was 6.3%. It is very common in Down syndrome and some congenital infections. If present, the physician should rule out serious conditions associated with the third fontanelle.

== Other animals ==
=== Primates ===
In apes the fontanelles fuse soon after birth. In chimpanzees the anterior fontanelle is fully closed by 3 months of age.

=== Dogs ===
One of the more serious problems that can affect canines is known as an "open fontanelle", which occurs when the skull bones at the top of the head fail to close. The problem is often found in conjunction with hydrocephalus, which is a condition in which too much fluid is found within and around the brain, placing pressure on the brain and surrounding tissues. Often the head will appear dome-shaped, and the open fontanelle is noticeable as a "soft spot" on the top of the dog's head. The fluid-filled spaces within the brain, known as ventricles, also become swollen. The increased pressure damages or prevents the development of brain tissue.

Not all open fontanelles are connected with hydrocephalus. In many young dogs the skull bones are not fused at birth, but instead will close slowly over a three- to six-month period. Occasionally these bones fail to close, but the dog is still healthy. In these cases, however, the dog's owners need to be very careful, since any injury or bumps to the animal's head could cause significant brain damage, as well as conditions like epilepsy.

An open fontanelle, known as a molera, is a recognized feature of the Chihuahua breed. The American Kennel Club breed standard states that the skull of the Chihuahua should be domed, with or without the molera being present. However, the Fédération Cynologique Internationale (FCI) standard for the Chihuahua lists an open fontanelle as a disqualification.

== Additional images ==
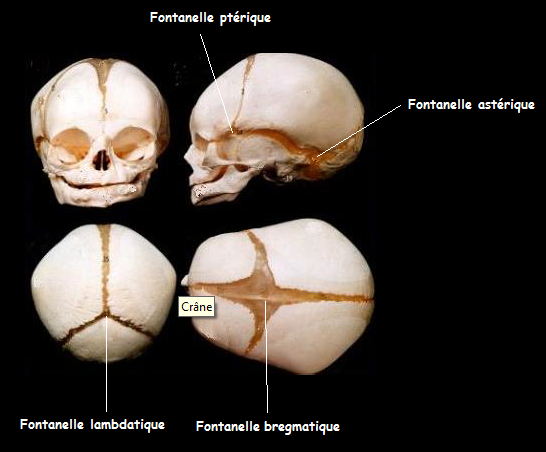
Fontanelle

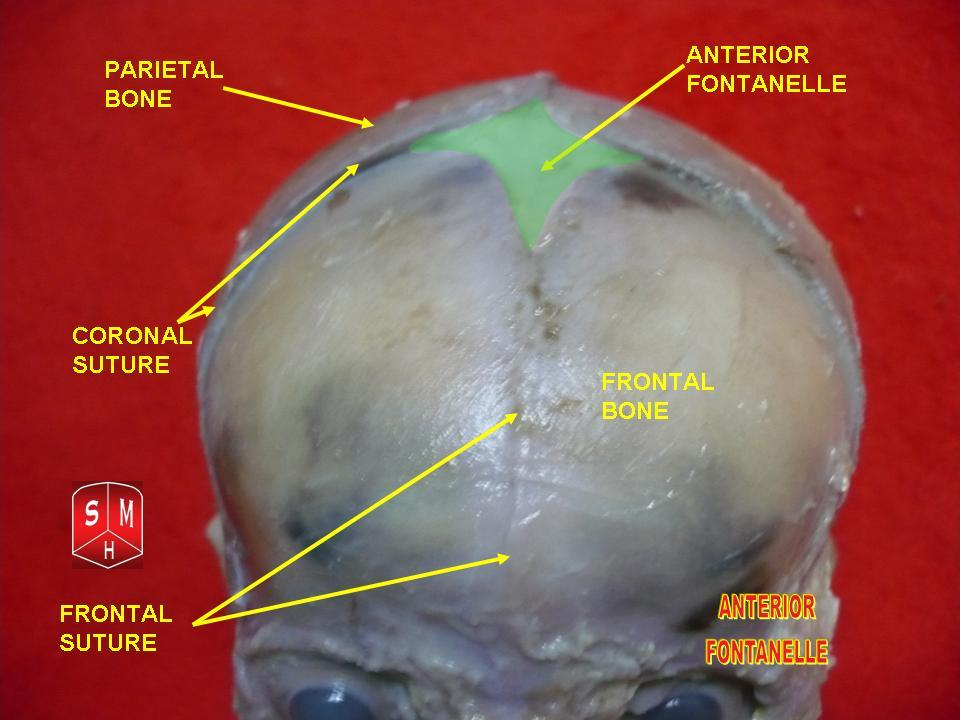
Anterior fontanelle

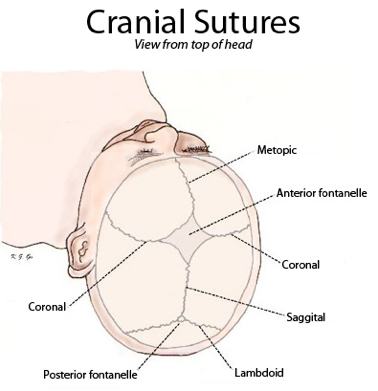
Cranial sutures

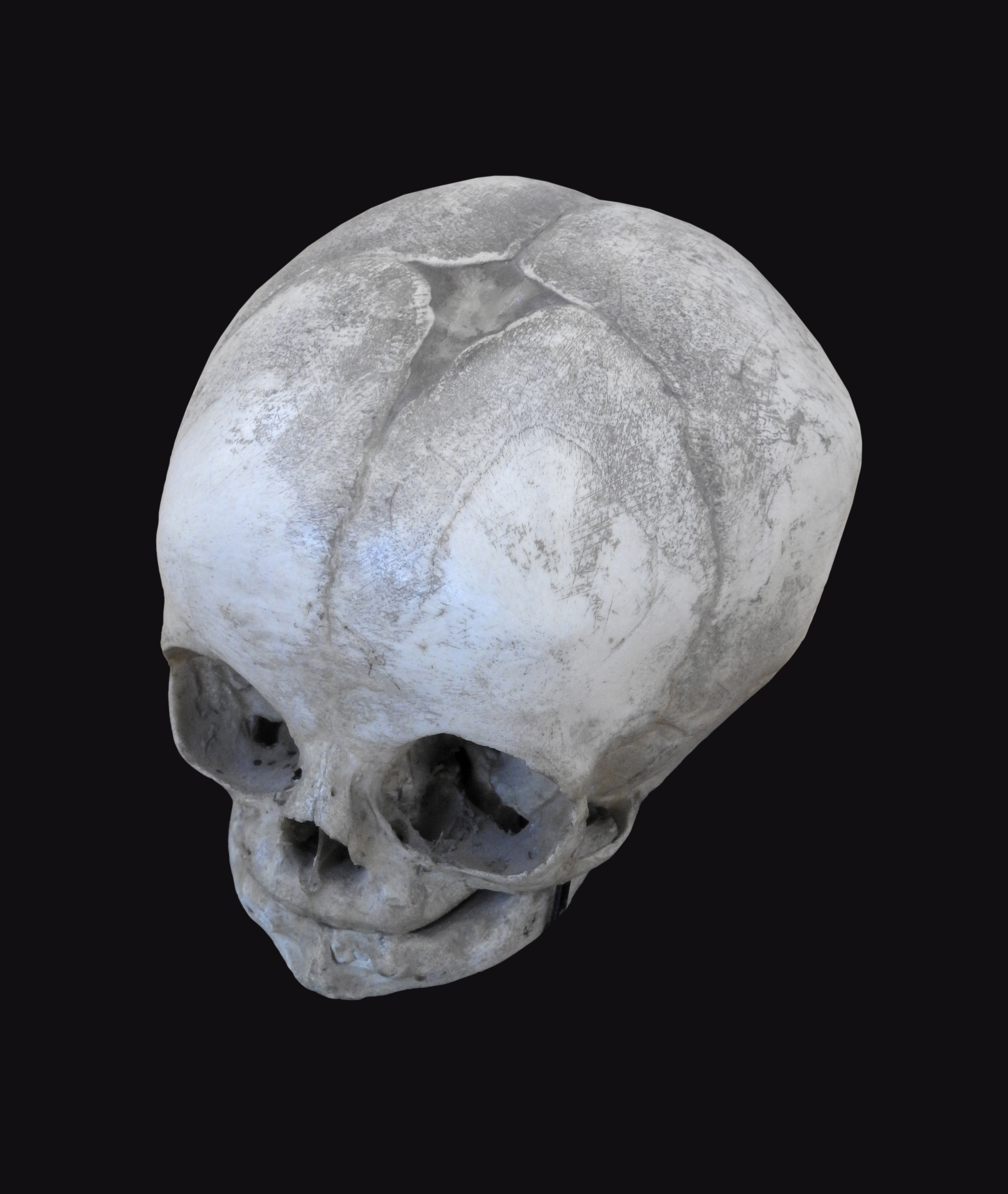
Infant skull
