= Crown (head) =

Top of the head

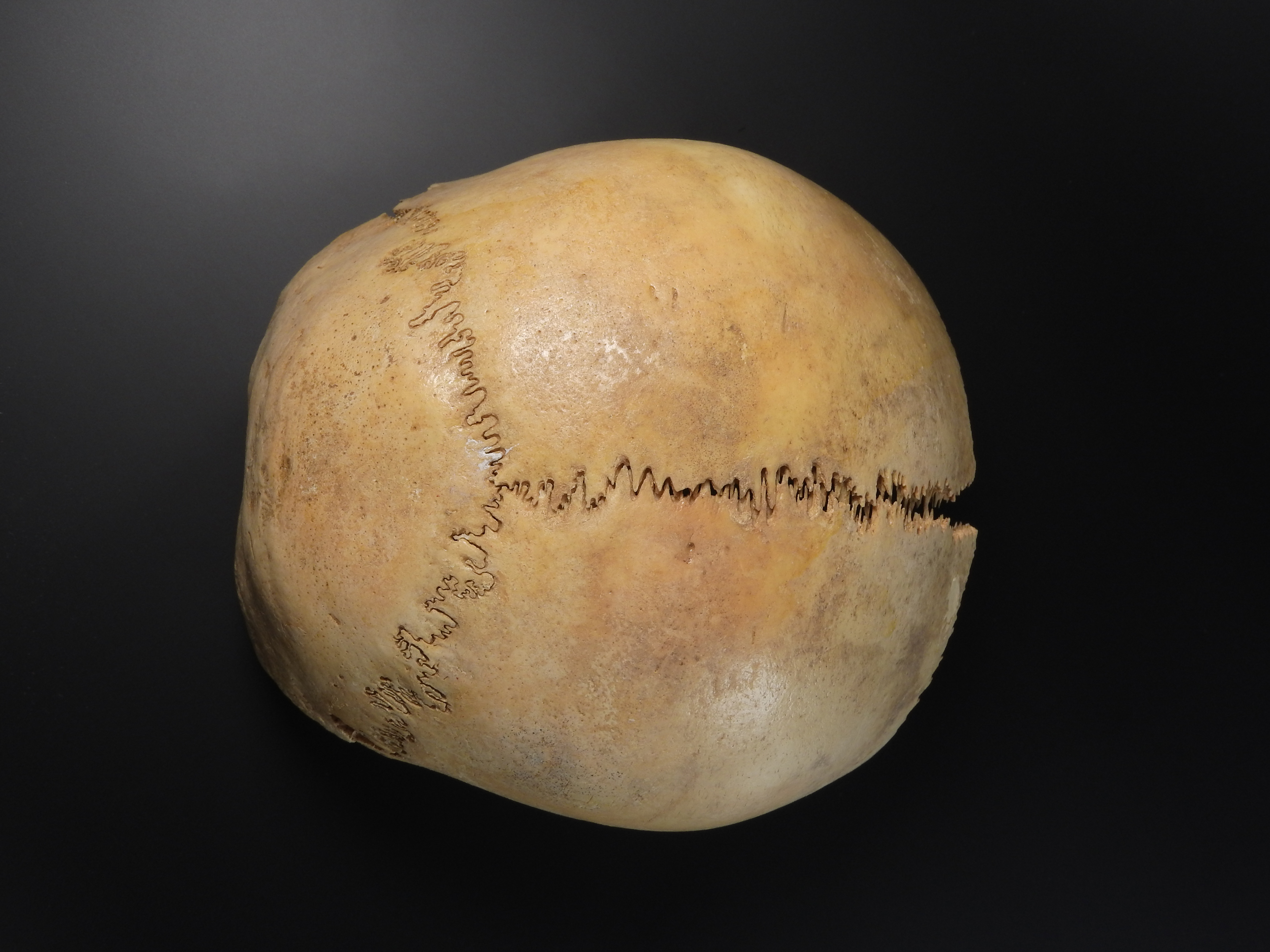
- A birds-eye view of the crown, which is the highest point of the skull.

Details
- System: Skeletal system
- Insertions: Scalp, meninges, bones
- Articulations: Sutures

The crown is the top portion of the head behind the vertex. The anatomy of the crown varies between different organisms. The human crown is made of three layers of the scalp above the skull. The crown also covers a range of bone sutures, and contains blood vessels and branches of the trigeminal nerve.

The structure of the human crown provides a protective cavity for the brain and optimizes the crown's ability to ensure the neocortex is safe. Different parts of the neocortex, such as the frontal lobe and the parietal lobe, are protected by the meninges and bone structures. Other organisms, such as whales, have their blowholes on their crown, causing a flattened head shape. Some bird species have a crest located on their crown, used for communication and courtship.

Macroevolution of the human crown has led to different structures between modern and archaic human species, such as significant changes to the cranial vault. The human crown is prone to different injuries and disorders with various causes, medical signs and symptoms, methods of diagnosis, and treatments. For example, illnesses such as cerebrospinal fluid leak, which results in intense headaches that are localised underneath the crown. Other diseases include meningioma, a tumor surrounding essential blood vessels and nerves that may be near the crown, causing symptoms such as memory loss.

== Structure ==
The crown is at the top of the human skull, and contains the different layers of the scalp. The scalp has three distinct layers including the cutaneous layer, a subcutaneous connective tissue layer, and a muscular layer. The crown covers bone layers of the skull. It is between 4 and 7 millimetres (0.16 and 0.28 in) thick, and varies between different people. It tends to increase in thickness with age.

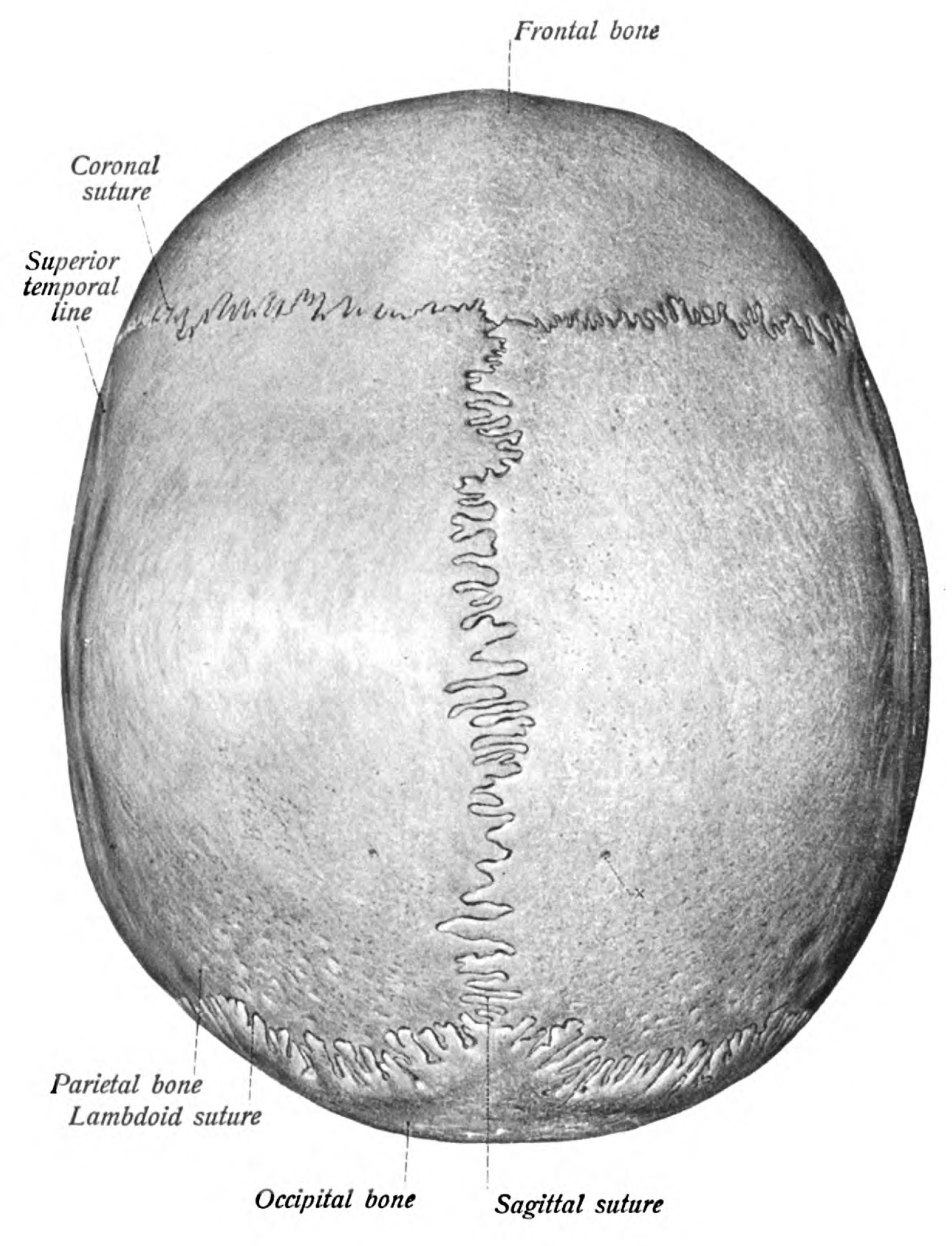
The frontal and parietal bones are joined by the coronal suture. The two separate parietal bones are connected at the sagittal suture.

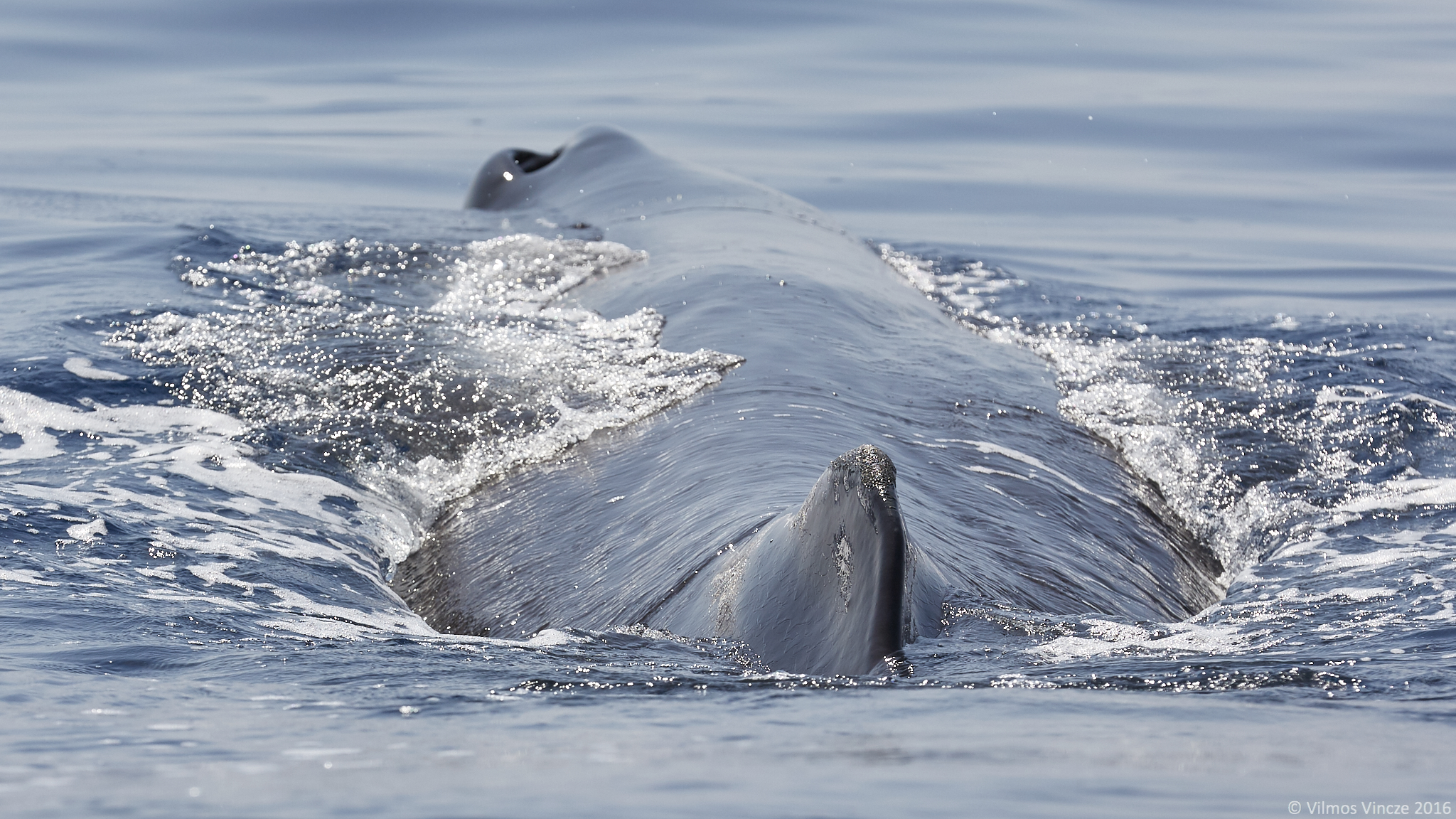
The blowhole of sperm whales is located on the crown of the head and allows the whale to breathe.

Below the crown, the frontal bone and the parietal bones are separated by a range of fibrous joints called sutures. The sutures are an essential part of growth and development, allowing the skull to expand as the brain increases in size. Different sutures between the frontal and parietal bones of the skull expand in specific directions, causing a symmetrically shaped human head. The frontal bone and the parietal bones are joined at the frontal suture. The frontal bone has a number of parts, including the squamous part, the orbital part, and the nasal parts. The frontal bone connects to the parietal bone at the coronal suture to shape the crown and sides of the skull. The two separate parietal bones are joined at the sagittal suture, ensuring the crown is stable. Other structures of the human crown include blood vessels and nerves, which are essential for the allocation of nutrients to the brain, and the transmission of information to the brain. The superficial temporal artery branches from the common external carotid artery and delivers oxygenated blood to the crown. The crown also contains branches of the trigeminal nerve.

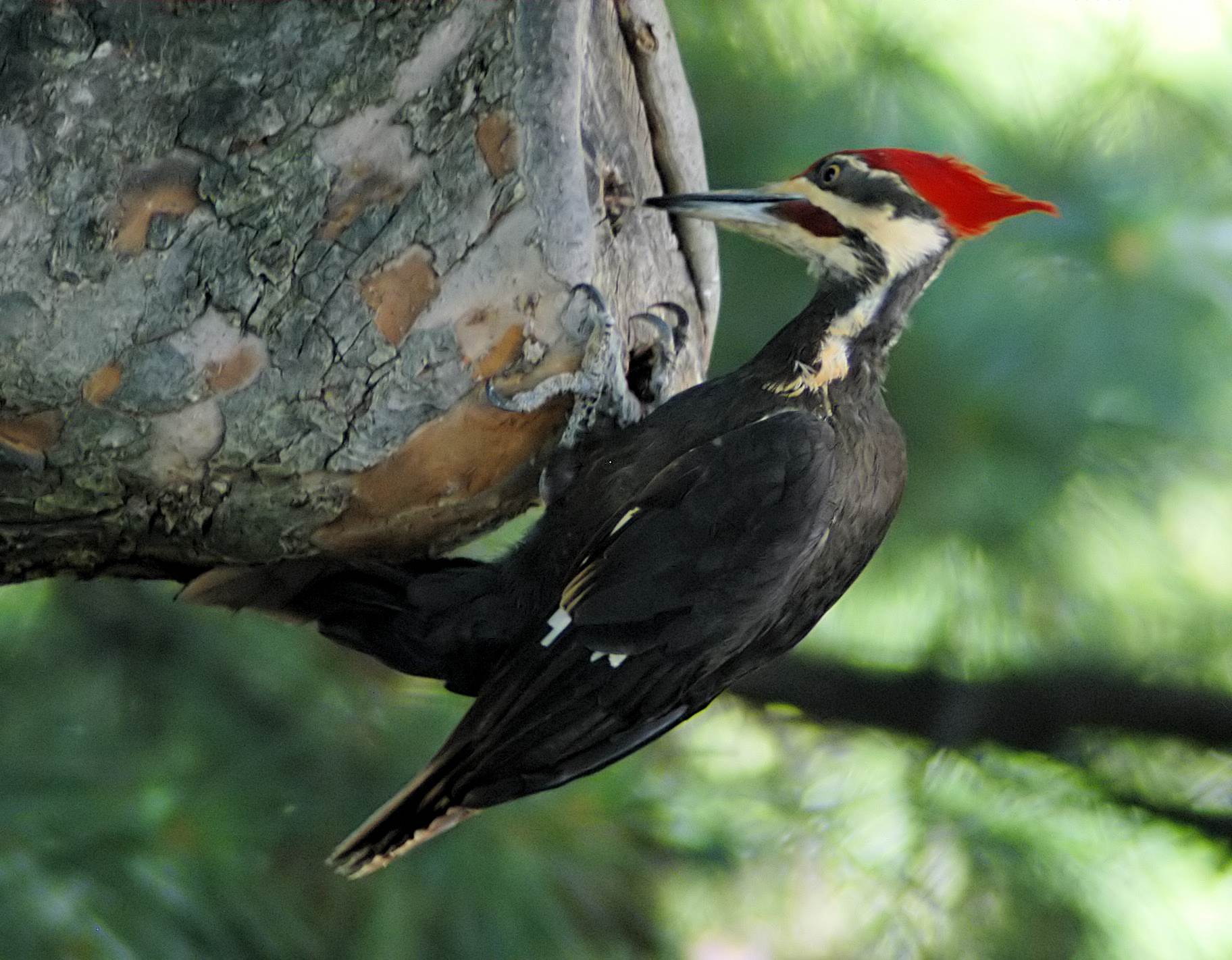
The pileated woodpecker on a tree branch, showing its crest which is under the pileum and the crown of the head.

Organisms such as whales and birds have different crown structures and species use them in different situations. Sperm whales have their blowholes situated asymmetrically on the crown of the head to breathe, causing a flattened head shape. In bird anatomy, the crown is the top of the head, or more specifically the zone from the frons, or forehead, extending posteriorly to the occiput and laterally on both sides to the temples. The upper part of the head, including frons, crown, and occiput, is called the pileum. A bird with a crest covering the pileum is described as "pileated" such as the pileated woodpecker. The range of feathers that make up the crest determines the bird's emotions and courtship behaviors. For instance, bird species such as the northern cardinal move the crest intensely to signify dominance and communication.

== Function ==
The main function of the crown is to protect the brain from specific physical injuries. The neurocranium has the frontal and parietal bones that make up the crown and protect parts of the brain including the frontal lobe as well as the parietal lobe. The three membranes of the meninges ensures stability and prevents injuries directed to these lobes. For instance, the meninges which include flexible sheets between the brain, spinal cord, and skull aim to protect the frontal lobe, located behind the forehead. The cerebrospinal fluid within the ventricles of the skull reduces the extent of the injury by acting as a cushion. Protecting the frontal lobe allows humans to perform motor movements and to execute functions. The parietal lobe of the neocortex which contains a strip targeting the sense of touch and allows for the representation of space for action is protected due to the thick layers of the crown.

== Injuries and diseases ==
The crown or human head is subjected to a range of injuries and diseases causing the brain to be vulnerable. The extent of the injuries and diseases directed to the human crown causes additional implications to the brain, impacting the individual's ability to function normally. The range of injuries and disorders have specific causes, medical signs and symptoms, diagnosis methods and treatments.

=== Cerebrospinal fluid leak ===
A common disease associated with the crown includes the cerebrospinal fluid leak, which involves the excess removal of fluid within the meninges. The cerebrospinal fluid leak is mainly caused by a head, brain, or spinal injury which tears the meninges membrane. The excessive leakage of the cerebrospinal fluid leads to symptoms that include intense headaches often localised to the crown. An extreme sign of this disorder includes the leakage of fluid from the patient's ears and nose. The diagnosis of the cerebrospinal fluid leak is determined from examinations including a computerised tomography scan which involves an X-ray image of parts of the skull including the crown. Health professionals offer treatments to manage the symptoms associated with the disease. For example, consuming fluids such as water aims to stop excess leakage and reduce headaches, and antibiotics are also provided if signs of infection are clear such as fever and chills.

=== Meningioma ===
Meningioma is a cranial disorder and is characterised by tumor growth on the meninges, surrounding the blood vessels and nerves near the crown. The causes of the disorder include a rapid division of cells around the area. The patients that have meningioma develop signs and symptoms including amnesia and epileptic seizures. The direct impact to the frontal lobe of the brain causes symptoms such as weakness to the arms and legs. Diagnosis is made via imaging tests such as magnetic resonance imaging (MRI) which involves high-frequency radio waves and a strong magnetic field allowing for the measurement of protons in the water. The treatments involve surgery to remove the tumor from the patient's meninges and the extent of the surgery depends on the size and aggression of the meningioma.

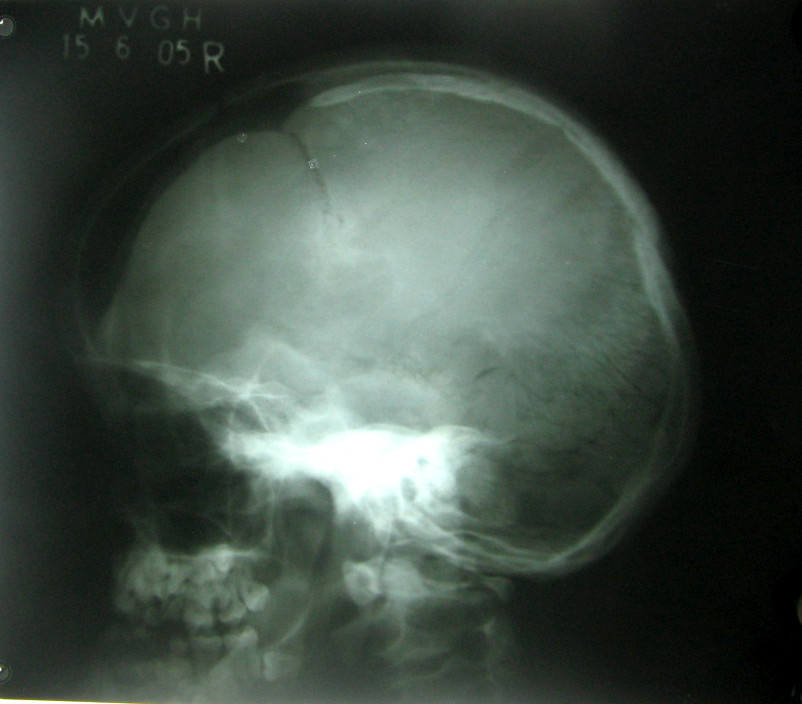
An obvious fracture to the crown of the skull causing damage to the brain.

=== Fractures ===
Bone fractures to the crown of the head are linear or depressed and range in severity based on the impact to the skull. The linear fracture involves a break to the skull whereas the depressed fracture results in the scatter of skull fragments. The skull fractures are mainly caused by incidents involving a vehicle, assault, or a fall. In more severe cases, penetrating skull fractures are caused by an object such as a metal rod or bullet breaking through the skull completely. Based on the severity of the fracture, symptoms may include nausea, memory loss, concussion, bruise, and lethargy. Another symptom such as bleeding results in the build-up of pressure in the skull since it is an enclosed cavity and thus pushes the brain to the brainstem opening leading to a coma. Diagnosis occurs due to a range of physical exams which identifies the extent of the injury and possible treatments. For example, the computerised tomography scan identifies the site of the fracture and any associated injuries to the brain, whereas magnetic resonance imaging highlights the damaged tissue. The treatments of severe skull fractures include surgery and medication to avoid infection, however, for linear fractures treatment involves rest for approximately 5 to 10 days, so that the crown can heal.

=== Gorham's disease ===
Gorham's disease is a condition that targets the human musculoskeletal system including the crown of the skull. The chronic disorder involves the progressive loss of bone, although, symptoms such as intense pain are not evident during the initial stages. The cause of the Gorham disease has not been discovered, however, cells associated with the breakdown of fragile and old bones which include osteoclasts are considered to be the main link towards identifying the cause. The symptoms of the disease are clear after a fracture to the crown of the skull causing patients to experience abnormal deformities as well as issues to the nervous system. Diagnosis occurs through physical exams such as X-rays and magnetic resonance imaging which find the decrease in bone mass (osteolysis) and deformities. Treatment of the disease involves a range of techniques to prevent spread from the skull to the spine or chest of the patient. Chemotherapy and surgery, as well as lifestyle changes such as consuming a diet of high protein, aim to minimise the severity of the disease.

== Evolution ==
The macroevolution of the human species resulted in changes such as the increase in bone and muscle structures that support the crown of the head, compared to primates. Modern human species have a cranial base which is more angled and a cranial vault that is rounded, compared to archaic human species. Modern human species have their temporal lobes positioned under the cranial base signifying the increase in the size of the human brain and skull.

The sagittal vault's morphology, which is the area that joins the two parietal bones together to make up the structure of the crown, has remained the same for archaic and modern human species. The cartilage embedded within the skull plays a major role in the changes of the crown. The cartilage evident within the cranium were an essential part in defending the central nervous system, however, over time the cartilage began to shape the crown by a process known as endochondral ossification. This process involves the replacement of grown cartilage with bone to develop the bone structure of the skull.

== See also ==
- Calvaria (skull)
