= Vertex (anatomy) =

Highest point of the head

Details

Identifiers
- Latin: vertex
- TA98: A02.1.00.033
- TA2: 179
- FMA: 46484

In arthropod and vertebrate anatomy, the vertex (or cranial vertex) is the highest point of the head.

In humans, the vertex is formed by four bones of the skull: the frontal bone, the two parietal bones, and the occipital bone. These bones are connected by the coronal suture between the frontal and parietal bones, the sagittal suture between the two parietal bones, and the lambdoid suture between the parietal and occipital bones. Vertex baldness refers to a form of male pattern baldness in which the baldness is limited to the vertex, resembling a tonsure. In childbirth, vertex birth refers to the common head-first presentation of the baby, as opposed to the buttocks-first position of a breech birth.

In entomology, the color and shape of an insect's vertex and the structures arising from it are commonly used in identifying species.

== See also ==
- Calvaria (skull)
- Crown (anatomy)
- Male pattern baldness
