= Bregma =

Meeting point of the coronal suture and the sagittal suture of the skull

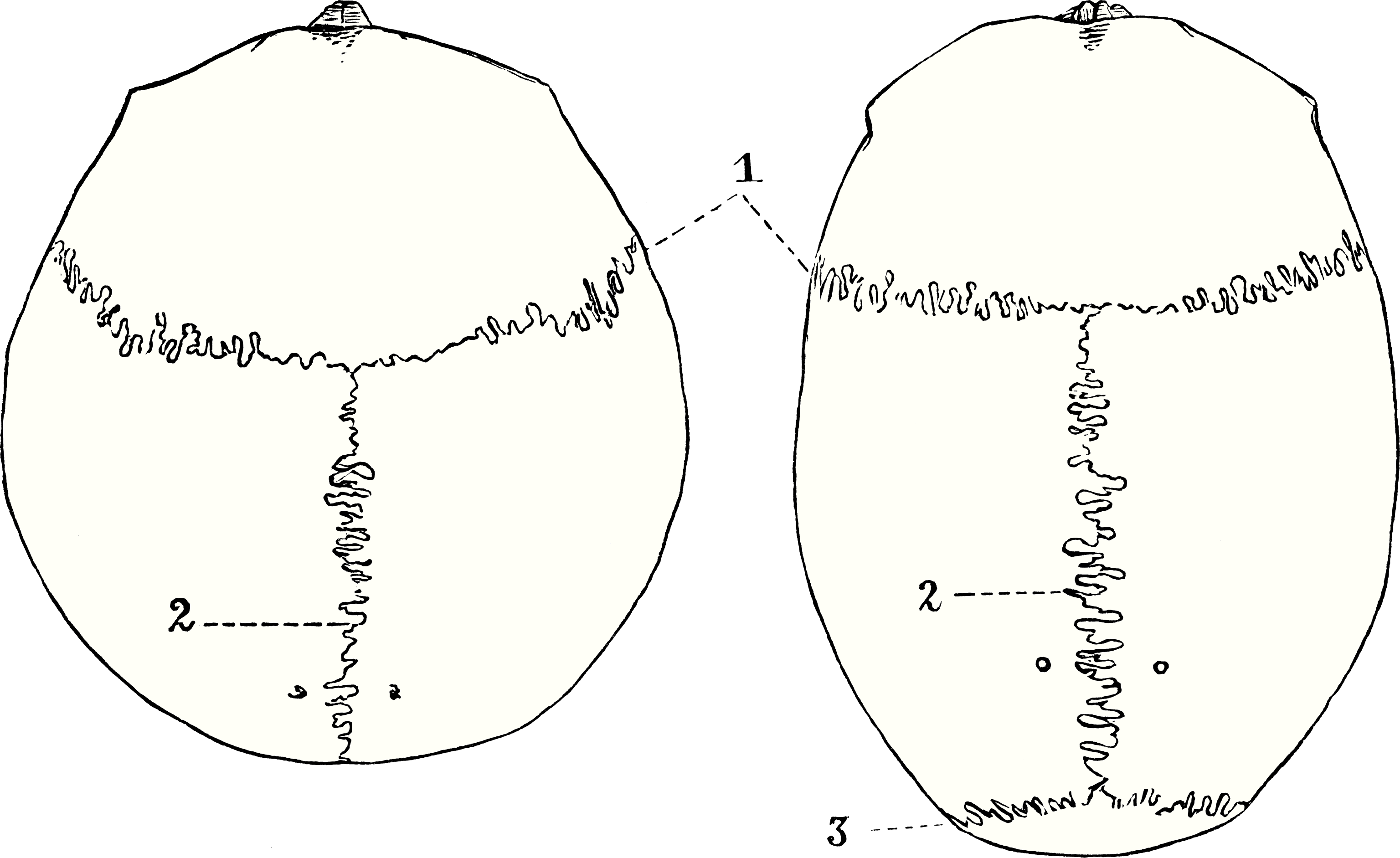
- Superior view of the calvarium, bregma located at the intersection of the coronal and sagittal sutures.: 1. Coronal Suture; 2. Sagittal Suture; 3. Lambdoid Suture; (Lambda also visible at the intersection of the lambdoid suture by the sagittal suture.)

Details
- Precursor: Anterior fontanelle
- System: Skeletal system

Identifiers
- Latin: bregma
- TA98: A02.1.00.016
- TA2: 418
- FMA: 264776

The bregma is the anatomical point on the skull at which the coronal suture is intersected perpendicularly by the sagittal suture.

== Structure ==
The bregma is located at the intersection of the coronal suture and the sagittal suture on the superior middle portion of the calvaria. It is the point where the frontal bone and the two parietal bones meet.

=== Development ===
The bregma is known as the anterior fontanelle during infancy. The anterior fontanelle is membranous and closes in the first 18-36 months of life.

== Clinical significance ==
=== Cleidocranial dysostosis ===
In the birth defect cleidocranial dysostosis, the closure of the anterior fontanelle is often delayed, and sometimes never completely closes to form the bregma.

=== Surgical landmark ===
The bregma is often used as a reference point for stereotactic surgery of the brain. It may be identified by blunt scraping of the surface of the skull and washing to make the meeting point of the sutures clearer.

=== Neonatal examination ===
Examination of an infant includes palpating the anterior fontanelle. It should be flat, soft, and less than 3.5 cm across. A sunken fontanelle indicates dehydration, whereas a very tense or bulging anterior fontanelle indicates raised intracranial pressure.

=== Height assessment ===
Cranial height is defined as the distance between the bregma and the midpoint of the foramen magnum (the basion). This is strongly linked to more general growth. This can be used to assess the general health of a deceased person as part of an archaeological excavation, giving information on the health of a population.

== Etymology ==
The word "bregma" comes from the Ancient Greek βρέγμα (brégma), meaning the bone directly above the brain.

== Additional images ==
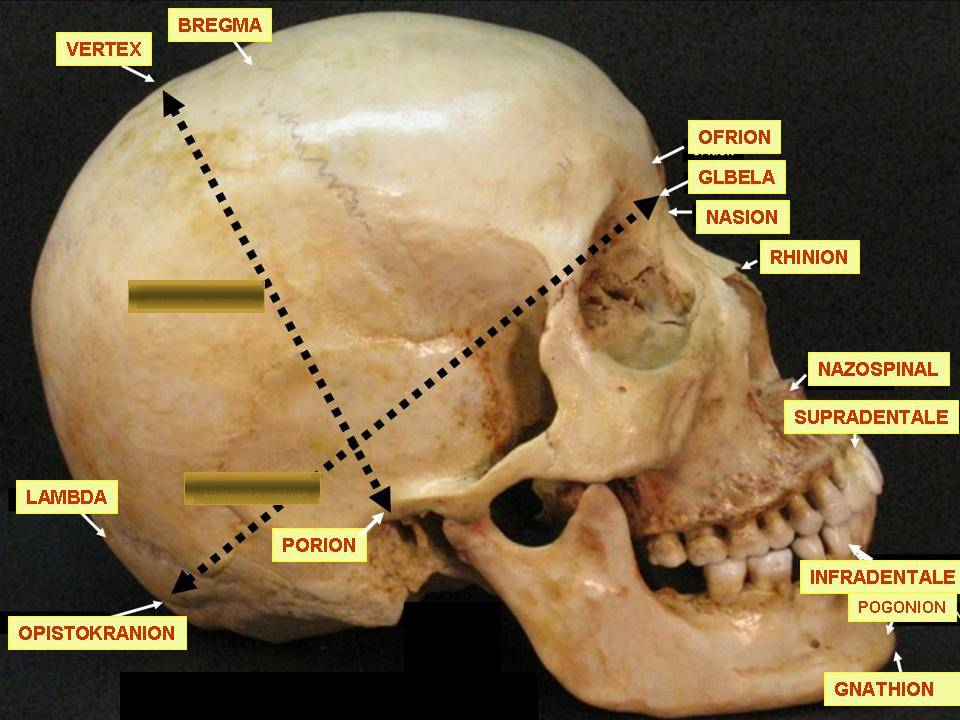
The bregma, human skull.
