= Posterior fontanelle =

Gap between bones in the human skull

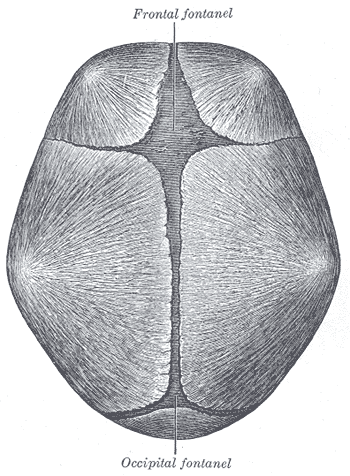
- Skull at birth, showing frontal and occipital fonticuli

Details

Identifiers
- Latin: fonticulus posterior
- TA98: A02.1.00.029
- TA2: 433
- FMA: 75440

The posterior fontanelle (lambdoid fontanelle, occipital fontanelle) is a gap between bones in the human skull (known as fontanelle), triangular in form and situated at the junction of the sagittal suture and lambdoidal suture. It generally closes in 6–8 weeks from birth. The cranial point in adults corresponding the fontanelle is called lambda. A delay in closure is associated with congenital hypothyroidism.
