= Lambda (anatomy) =

Meeting point of the sagittal suture and the lambdoid suture of the skull

- Side view of head, showing surface relations of bones. (Lambda labeled at center right.)

Details
- Precursor: Posterior fontanelle
- Part of: Skull, sagittal suture, lambdoid suture
- System: Skeletal

Identifiers
- TA98: A02.1.00.017
- TA2: 419
- FMA: 264773

The lambda is the meeting point of the sagittal suture and the lambdoid suture. This is also the point of the occipital angle. It is named after the Greek letter lambda.

== Structure ==
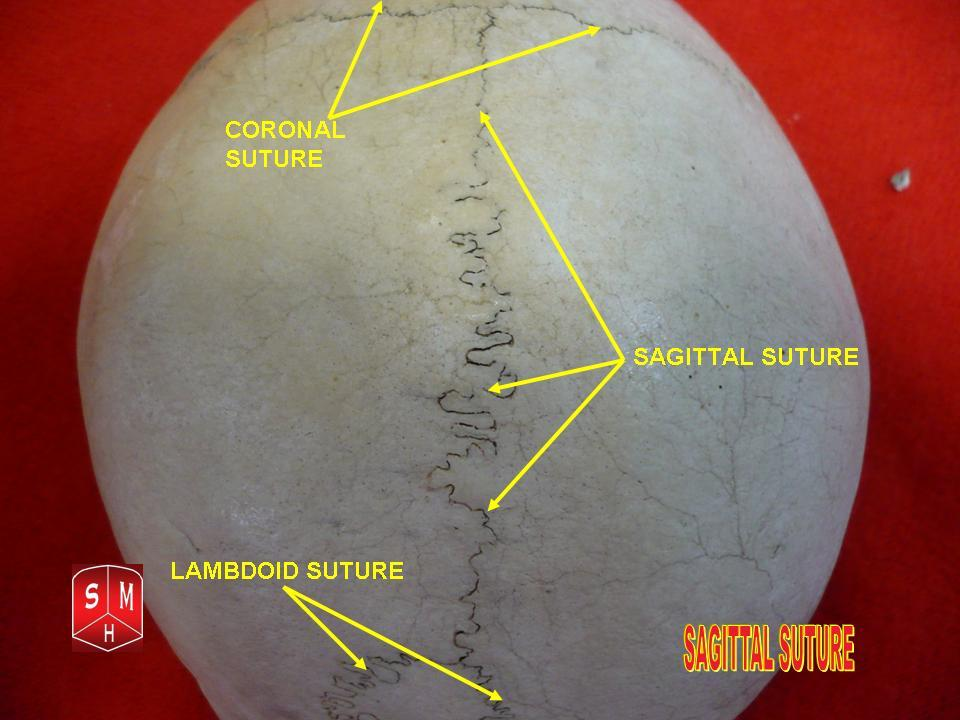
The sagittal and lamboid sutures.

The lambda is the meeting point of the sagittal suture and the lambdoid suture. It may be the exact midpoint of the lambdoid suture, but often deviates slightly from the midline. This is also the point of the occipital angle.

=== Development ===
In the foetus, the lambda is membranous, and is called the posterior fontanelle.

== Etymology ==
The lambda is named after the Greek letter lambda, whose lowercase form (λ) resembles the junction formed by the sutures.
