= Anterior fontanelle =

Fontanelle in human skull

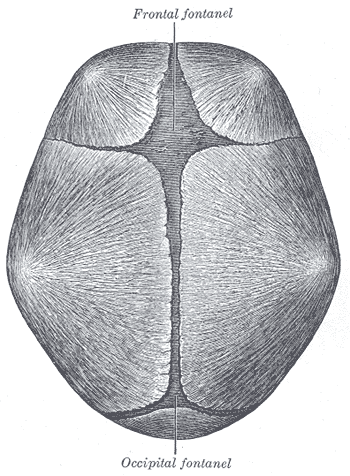
- Skull at birth, showing frontal and occipital fonticuli.

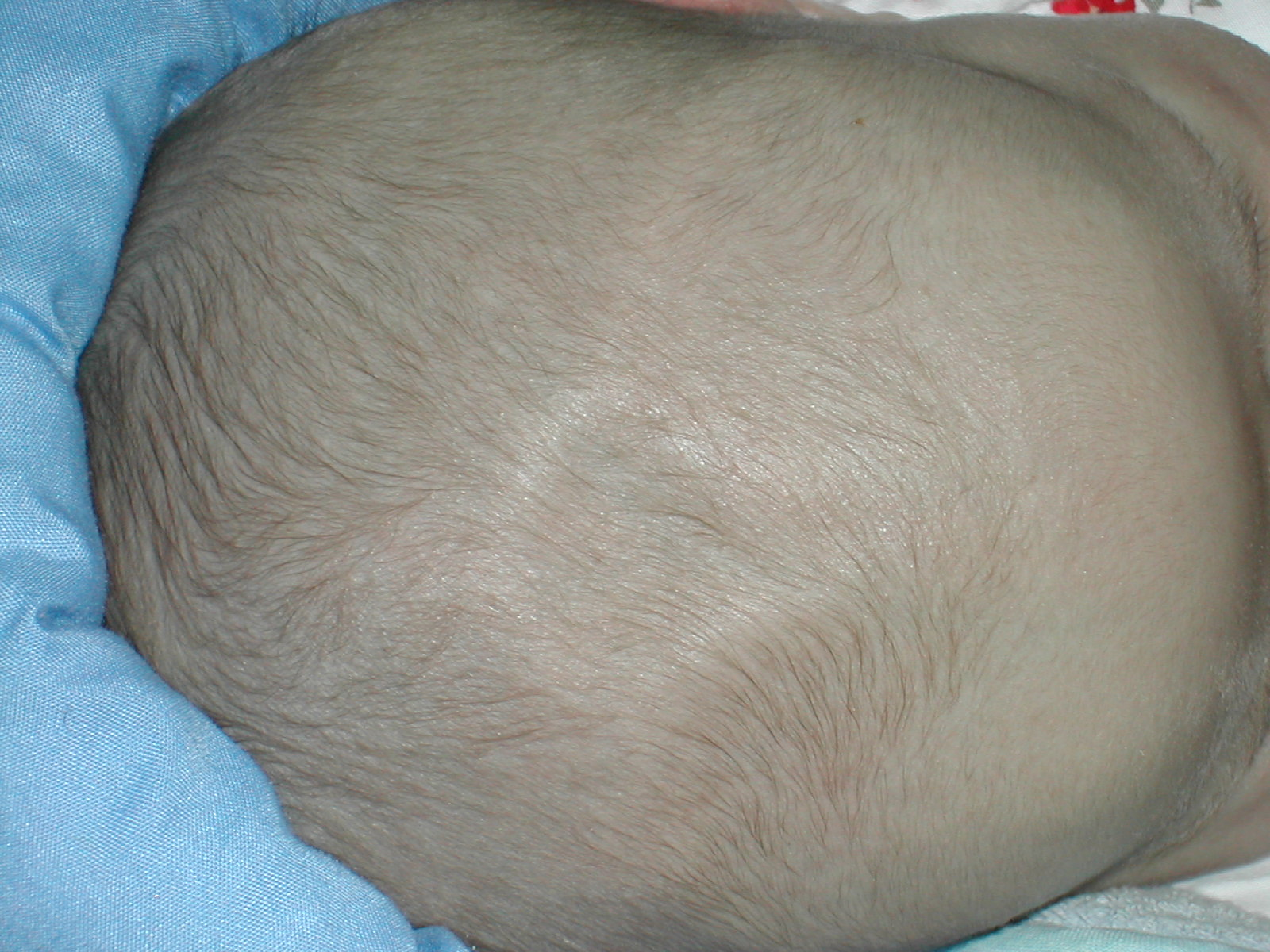
- Human anterior fontanelle 1 month

Details

Identifiers
- Latin: fonticulus anterior
- TA98: A02.1.00.028
- TA2: 432
- FMA: 75439

The anterior fontanelle (bregmatic fontanelle, frontal fontanelle) is the largest fontanelle, and is placed at the junction of the sagittal suture, coronal suture, and frontal suture; it is lozenge-shaped, and measures about 4 cm in its antero-posterior and 2.5 cm in its transverse diameter. The fontanelle allows the skull to deform during birth to ease its passage through the birth canal and for expansion of the brain after birth.

The anterior fontanelle typically closes between the ages of 12 and 18 months.

== Clinical significance ==
The anterior fontanelle is useful clinically. Examination of an infant includes palpating the anterior fontanelle. A sunken fontanelle indicates dehydration whereas a very tense or bulging anterior fontanelle indicates raised intracranial pressure. However, this is not a certain indicator for raised pressure as prolonged crying by the baby may produce the same effect. A full anterior fontanelle may also be indicative of neonatal meningitis, specifically acute bacterial meningitis.

== Additional images ==
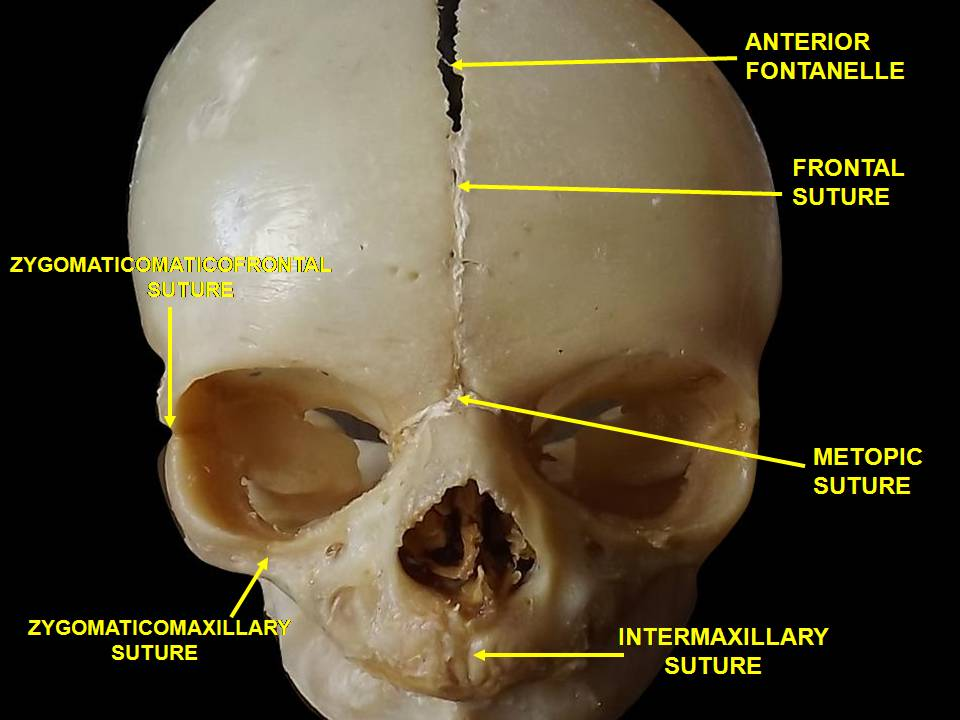
Skull of newborn. Anterior view.

== See also ==
- Bregma
