= Asterion (anatomy) =

Meeting point between three sutures between bones of the skull

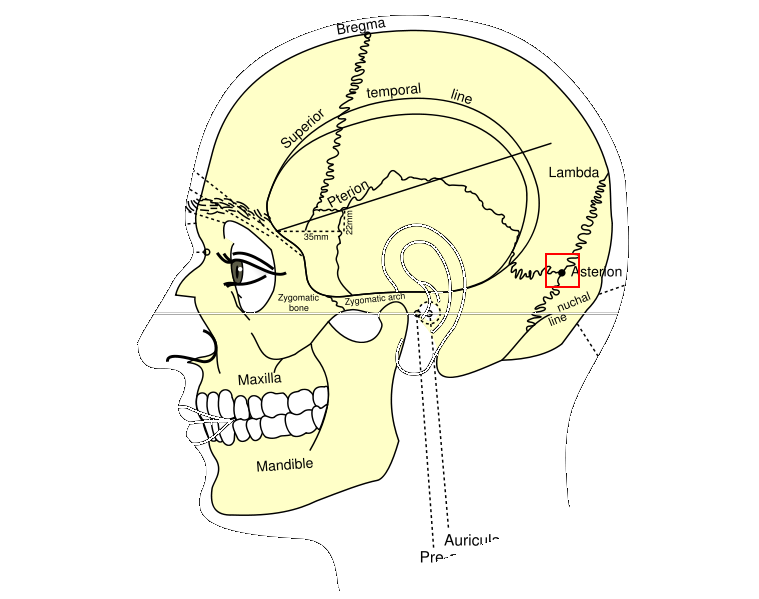
- Side view of head, showing surface relations of bones. (Asterion visible at center right.)

Details
- Part of: Skull
- System: Skeletal

Identifiers
- Latin: asterion
- TA98: A02.1.00.020
- TA2: 422
- FMA: 76625

The asterion is a meeting point between three sutures between bones of the skull. It is an important surgical landmark.

== Structure ==
In human anatomy, the asterion is a visible (craniometric) point on the exposed skull. It is just posterior to the ear. It is the point where three cranial sutures meet:

- the lambdoid suture.
- parietomastoid suture.
- occipitomastoid suture.

It is also the point where three cranial bones meet:

- the parietal bone.
- the occipital bone.
- the mastoid portion of the temporal bone.

In the adult, it lies 4 cm behind and 12 mm above the center of the entrance to the ear canal. Its relation to other anatomical structures is fairly variable.

== Clinical significance ==
Neurosurgeons may use the asterion to orient themselves, in order to plan safe entry into the skull for some operations, such as when using a retro-sigmoid approach. The asterion marks the junction of the transverse and the sigmoid sinuses

== Etymology ==
The asterion receives its name from the Greek ἀστέριον (astērion), meaning "star" or "starry".

The Mercedes point is an alternative term for the asterion, for its resemblance to the Mercedes-Benz logo.
