= Sagittal suture =

Midline joint of the skull

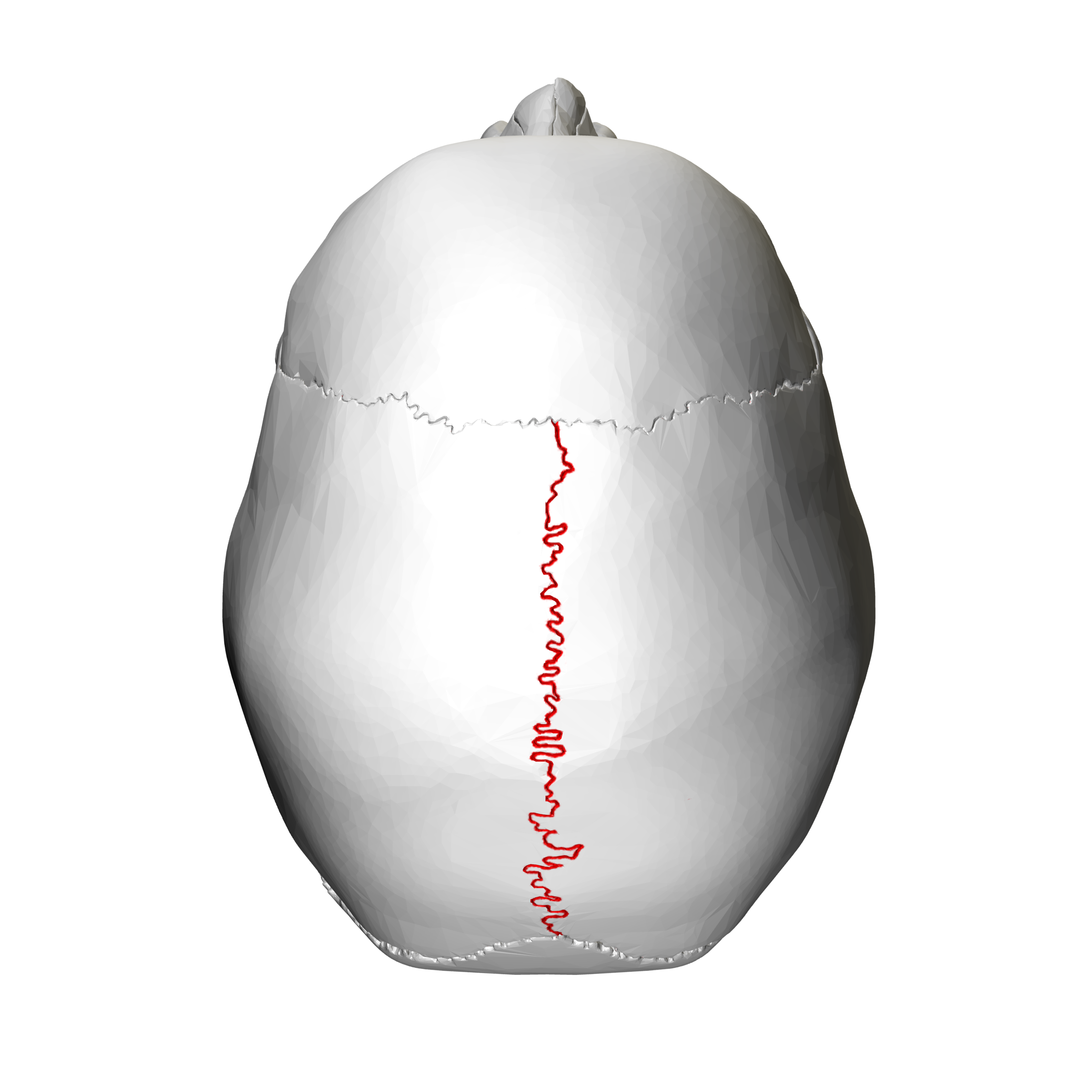
- Human adult skull from above

Details

Identifiers
- Latin: sutura sagittalis
- TA98: A03.1.02.003
- TA2: 1576
- FMA: 52929

The sagittal suture, also known as the interparietal suture and the sutura interparietalis, is a dense, fibrous connective tissue joint between the two parietal bones of the skull. The term is derived from the Latin word sagitta, meaning arrow.

== Structure ==
The sagittal suture is formed from the fibrous connective tissue joint between the two parietal bones of the skull. It has a varied and irregular shape which arises during development. The pattern is different between the inside and the outside.

Two anatomical landmarks are found on the sagittal suture: the bregma, and the vertex of the skull. The bregma is formed by the intersection of the sagittal and coronal sutures. The vertex is the highest point on the skull and is often near the midpoint of the sagittal suture.

=== Development ===
At birth, the bones of the skull do not meet. The gap that remains, which is approximately 5 mm wide, allows for the brain to continue to grow normally after birth. The inner parts of the parietal bones fuse before the outer parts.

== Clinical significance ==
If certain bones of the skull grow too fast before birth, then "premature closure" of the sutures may occur. This can cause craniosynostosis, which results in skull deformities. Sagittal craniosynostosis is the most common form.

If the sagittal suture closes early the skull becomes long, narrow, and wedge-shaped, a condition called 'scaphocephaly'.

== Society and culture ==
In forensic anthropology, the sagittal suture is one method used to date human remains. The suture begins to close at age twenty nine, starting at where it intersects at the lambdoid suture and working forward. By age thirty five, the suture is completely closed. This means that when inspecting a human skull, if the suture is still open, one can assume an age of less than twenty nine. Conversely, if the suture is completely formed, one can assume an age of greater than thirty five.

== History ==
The term is derived from the Latin word sagitta, meaning arrow. The derivation of this term may be demonstrated by observing how the sagittal suture is notched posteriorly, like an arrow, by the lambdoid suture.

The sagittal suture is also known as the 'interparietal suture', the sutura interparietalis.

== Additional images ==
Animation. Sagittal suture shown in red.

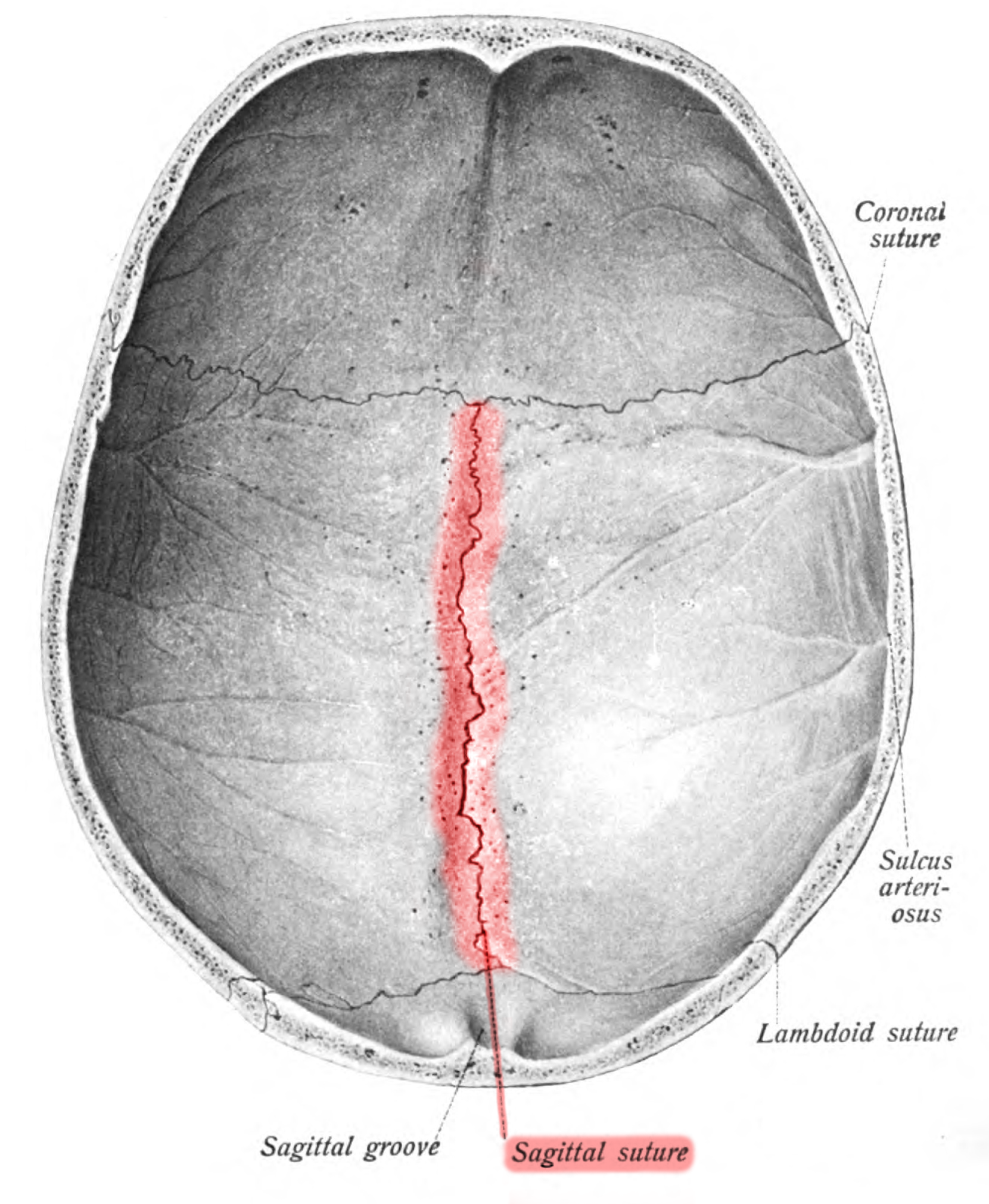
Sagittal suture seen from inside.

== See also ==
- Sagittal plane
