= Coronal suture =

Connective tissue on the skull

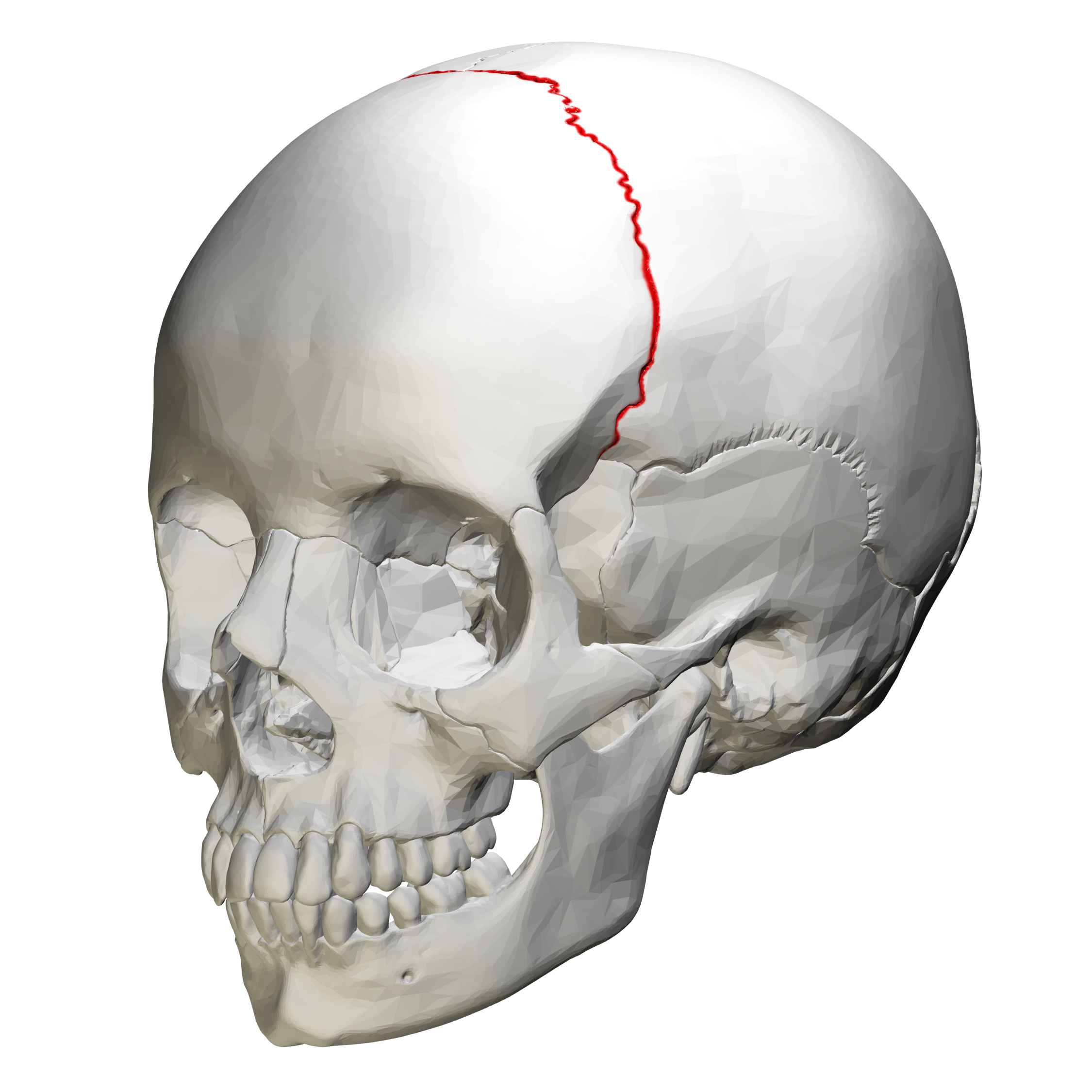
- Anterolateral view of coronal suture (red)

Details
- Part of: Skull
- System: Skeletal
- Nerve: Trigeminal nerve

Identifiers
- Latin: sutura coronalis
- TA98: A03.1.02.002
- TA2: 1575
- FMA: 52928

The coronal suture is a dense, fibrous connective tissue joint that separates the two parietal bones from the frontal bone of the skull.

== Structure ==
The coronal suture lies between the paired parietal bones and the frontal bone of the skull. It runs from the pterion on each side.

=== Nerve supply ===
The coronal suture is likely supplied by a branch of the trigeminal nerve.

=== Development ===
The coronal suture is derived from the paraxial mesoderm.

== Clinical significance ==
If certain bones of the skull grow too fast then premature fusion of the sutures, craniosynostosis, may occur. This can result in skull deformities. These deformities include:

- Brachycephaly (both sides)
- Plagiocephaly (one side only)
- Oxycephaly (both sides)

== Additional images ==
Animation. Coronal suture shown in red.

Frontal bone and parietal bones.

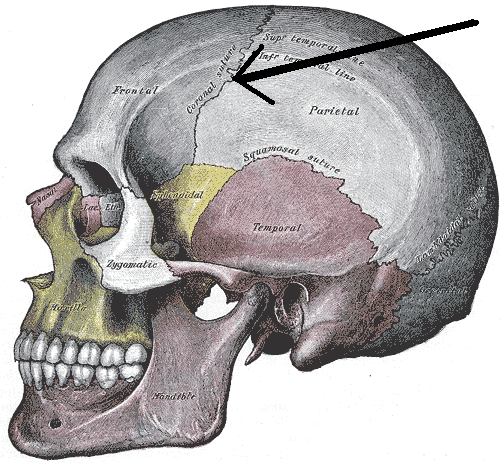
Side view of the skull. ('Coronal suture' indicated by the arrow.)

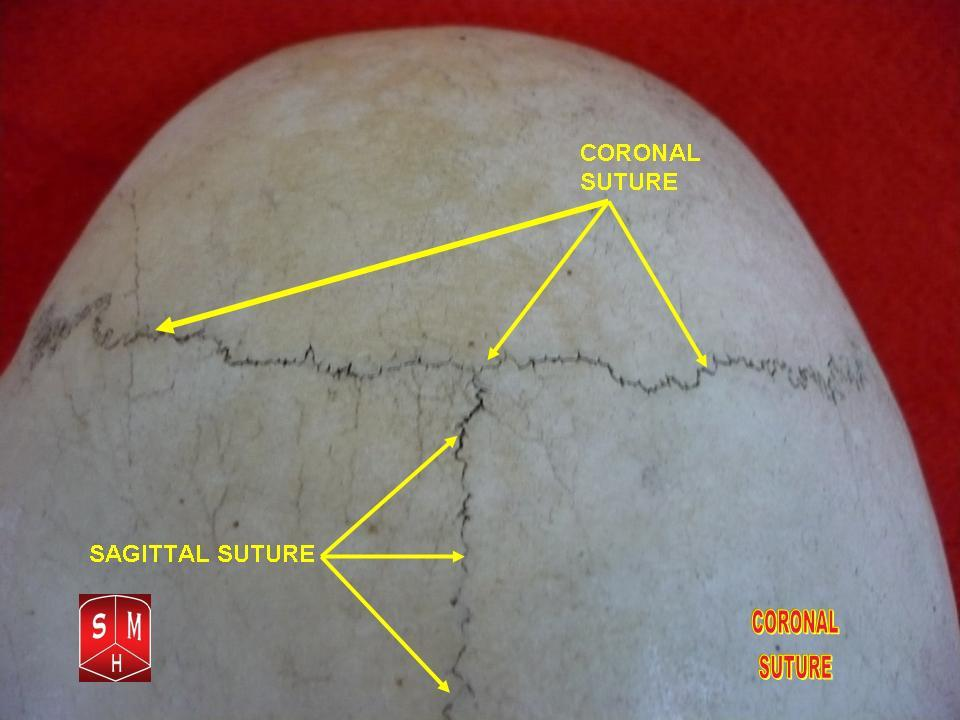
Superior view of anterior part of the skull. Coronal suture runs horizontally.

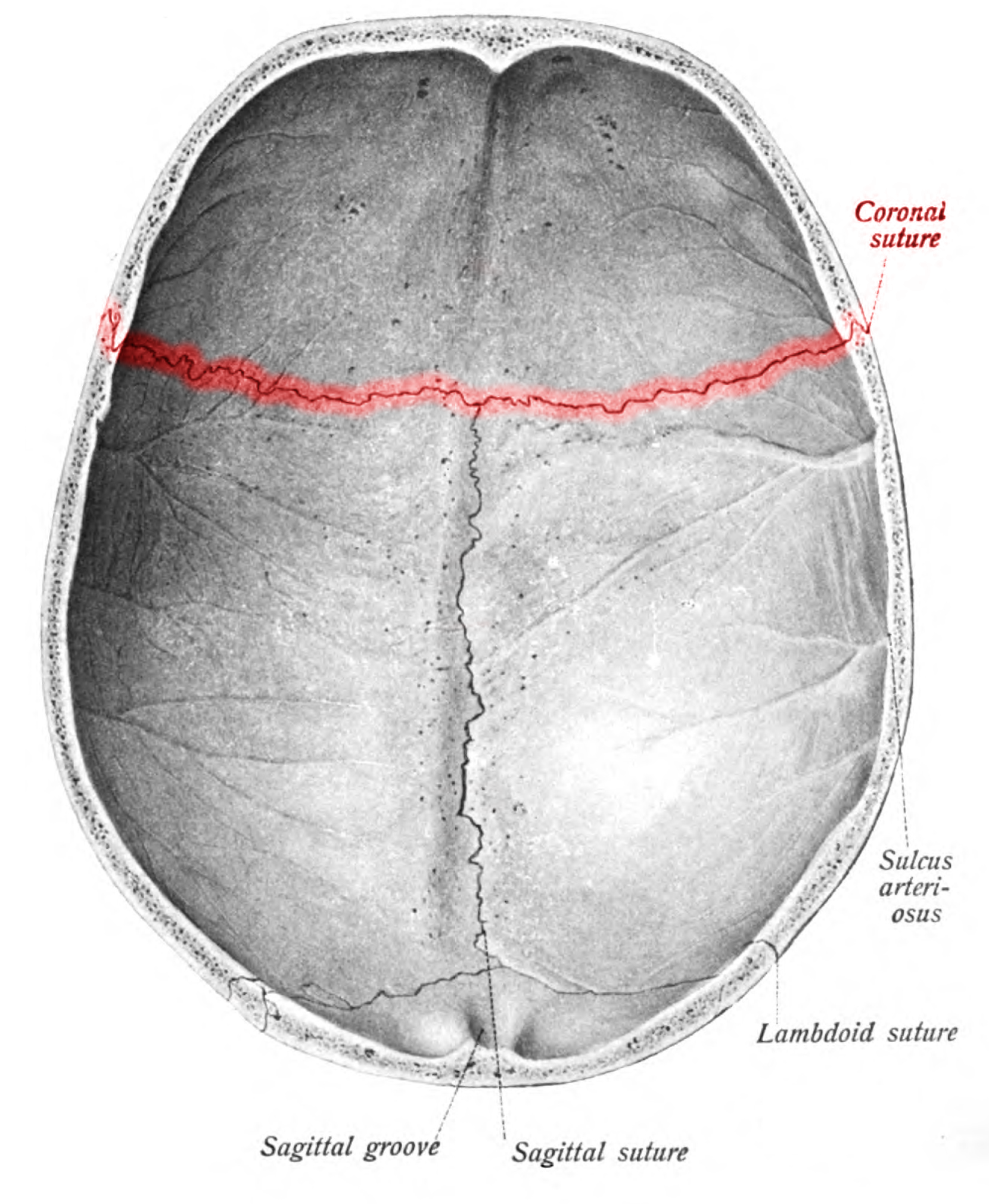
Coronal suture seen from inside.

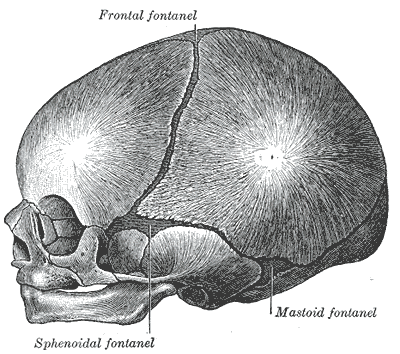
The skull at birth, showing the lateral fontanelle.

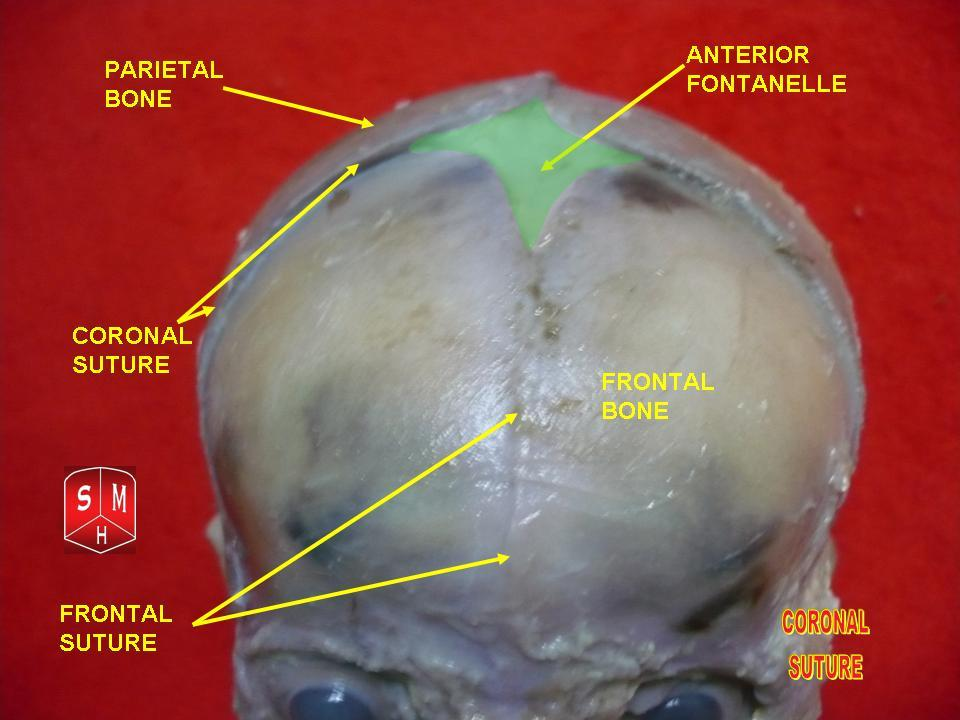
Coronal suture of new born baby.
