= List of obsolete taxa =

In the history of the Linnaean classification system, many taxa (e.g. species, genera, families, and higher taxonomic ranks) have become defunct or obsolete, and are no longer used.

== Kingdoms ==
Taxon	Classification(s) used	Contents
Kingdom Bionta	Walton (1930)	

== Animals ==
Taxon	Classification(s) used	Contents
Class Vermes	Linnaeus	Worms
Order Agriae	Linnaeus (1748)	Anteaters and pangolins
Order Anthropomorpha	Linnaeus (1740, 1748)	1740: Primates, anteaters, and sloths 1748: Primates and sloths
Order Belluae	Linnaeus (1758, 1766)	1758: Horses and hippopotamuses 1766: as above plus pigs, and rhinoceroses
Order Bestiae	Linnaeus (1758)	Pigs, armadillos, hedgehogs, moles, shrews, and opossums
Order Bruta	Linnaeus (1758, 1766)	1758: Elephants, manatees, sloths, anteaters, pangolins 1766: as above plus armadillos
Suborder Gravigrada		
Order Insectivora	Several	Hedgehog, shrews, moles, tenrecs, golden moles, otter shrews, solenodons, and sometimes elephant-shrews, treeshrews, and colugos
Order Jumenta	Linnaeus (1740, 1748)	1740: Shrews, horses, elephants, hippopotamuses, and pigs 1748: as above plus rhinoceroses
Order Lipotyphla		
Order and/or Suborder Pachydermata		Perissodactyls, elephants, hippopotamuses, peccaries, pigs, and sometimes camels
Order Quaternates	Blainville (1839)	Gravigrada, Pachydermata and Ruminantia
Order Secundates	Blainville (1839)	Chiroptera, Insectivora and Carnivora
Order Tertiates	Blainville (1839)	Glires
Superorder Archonta		Primates, Bats, Colugos, Treeshrews, and sometimes Elephant shrews
Genus Simia		Apes (but not humans) and monkeys
Genus Tylognathus	Heckel	A variety of freshwater ray finned fish
Genus Brochis	Cope	Three Catfish in the family Callichthyidae
Genus Aponomma	Lahille	A group of hard-bodied ticks

== Protists ==
Taxon	Classification(s) used	Contents
Phylum Sarcodina		Actinopoda; Rhizopoda; Proteomyxa
