= Parietal =

Parietal (literally: "pertaining or relating to walls") is an adjective used predominantly for the parietal lobe and other relevant anatomy.

Parietal may also refer to:

== Human anatomy ==
=== Brain ===
- The parietal lobe is found in all mammals. The human brain has a number of connected, related, and proximal suborgans and bones which contain the "parietal" in their names.
  - Inferior parietal lobule, below the horizontal portion of the intraparietal sulcus and behind the lower part of the postcentral sulcus
  - Parietal operculum, portion of the parietal lobe on the outside surface of the brain
  - Posterior parietal cortex, portion of parietal neocortex posterior to the primary somatosensory cortex
  - Superior parietal lobule, bounded in front by the upper part of the postcentral sulcus
  - Parietal branch of superficial temporal artery, curves upward and backward on the side of the head
- Parietal-temporal-occipital (PTO), includes portions of the parietal, temporal, and occipital lobes
- Parietal bone, of the skull
  - Parietal foramen (disambiguation)
  - Parietal eminence, external surface of the parietal bone

=== Other ===
- Parietal cell, in the stomach
- Parietal placentation, refers to the formation, type and structure, or arrangement of placentas
- Parietal pleura, attached to the wall of the thoracic cavity
- Parietal pericardium, double-walled sac that contains the heart and the roots of the great vessel

== Non-human anatomy ==
- Parietal callus, feature of the shell anatomy of some groups of snails
- Parietal eye, "third eye" of some animal species
- Parietal scales, the scales on the head of the snake
- Parietal wall, part of the margin of the aperture of a snail shell
- The neck frill on the skulls of dinosaurs of the suborder Marginocephalia

== Other ==
- Parietal art, art on natural cave surfaces
