= Michael Gottlieb =

Michael Gottlieb may refer to:

- Michael T. Gottlieb (1900–1980), American bridge player
- Michael Gottlieb (director) (1945–2014), American film director, screenwriter and video game producer
- Michael S. Gottlieb (born 1947), American physician and immunologist
- Michael Gottlieb (politician) (born 1968), American politician and member of the Florida House of Representatives

== See also ==
- Michael Gottlieb Agnethler (1719–1752), German botanist and numismatist
- Michael Gottlieb Bindesbøll (1800–1856), Danish architect
- Michael Gottlieb Birckner (1756–1798), Danish priest and philosopher
