= Matheron =

Matheron may refer to:

- Georges Matheron (1930–2000), French mathematician and geologist
- Philippe Matheron (1807-1899), 1807 – 1899) was a French palaeontologist and geologist
