= Laño =

Laño Lañu
- Location within Spain
- Coordinates: 42°39′49″N 2°37′19″W
- Country: Spain
- Province: Burgos
- Municipality: Condado de Treviño
- Concejo: Laño

Population
  - Total: c. 15
- Time zone: UTC + 1

Laño (Basque: Lañu) is a hamlet and concejo (a small administrative subdivision) in Condado de Treviño within the Treviño enclave; which is administratively part of the Spanish province of Burgos, but which is completely surrounded by the territory of the Basque country province of Álava. It is best known for the fossils of extinct vertebrates dating from around 70 million years before present which have been found there.

Las Gobas, a site of ancient artificial caves from the 7th to the 13th century CE, is located just north of the village.

== Palaeontology ==
The Paleontology Unit of the University of the Basque Country and other scientists have studied the fossil record at Laño. The fossils are from the late Cretaceous (late Campanian to lower Maastrichtian). It has been inferred that there was then a braided riverbed at the site, that the sea was nearby, and that the climate was tropical or sub-tropical.

Taxa identified at Laño include:

- Arcovenator sp., a species of abelisaurid dinosaur
- Acynodon iberoccitanus, a species of crocodilian in genus Acynodon
- Dortoka vasconica, a species of turtle in genus Dortoka in family Dortokidae in sub-order Pleurodira
- Gargantuavis, a genus of bird
- Herensugea caristiorum, a species of snake in genus Herensugea in family Madtsoiidae
- Lainodon orueetxebarriai, a species of placental mammal in genus Lainodon in family Zhelestidae
- Lirainosaurus astibiae, a species of sauropod dinosaur in genus Lirainosaurus
- Menarana laurasiae, a species of snake in genus Menarana
- Musturzabalsuchus buffetauti, a species of crocodilian in genus Musturzabalsuchus
- Polysternon atlanticum, a species of turtle in genus Polysternon
- Solemys vermiculata, a species of turtle in genus Solemys in family Helochelydridae
- Rhabdodon, a genus of ornithopod
- Struthiosaurus, a genus of ankylosaur
- Taveirosaurus, a genus of ornithischian dinosaur
- Tarascosaurus a genus of abelisaurid dinosaur
- ?Pyroraptor, a genus of dromaeosaurid dinosaur

== Gallery ==
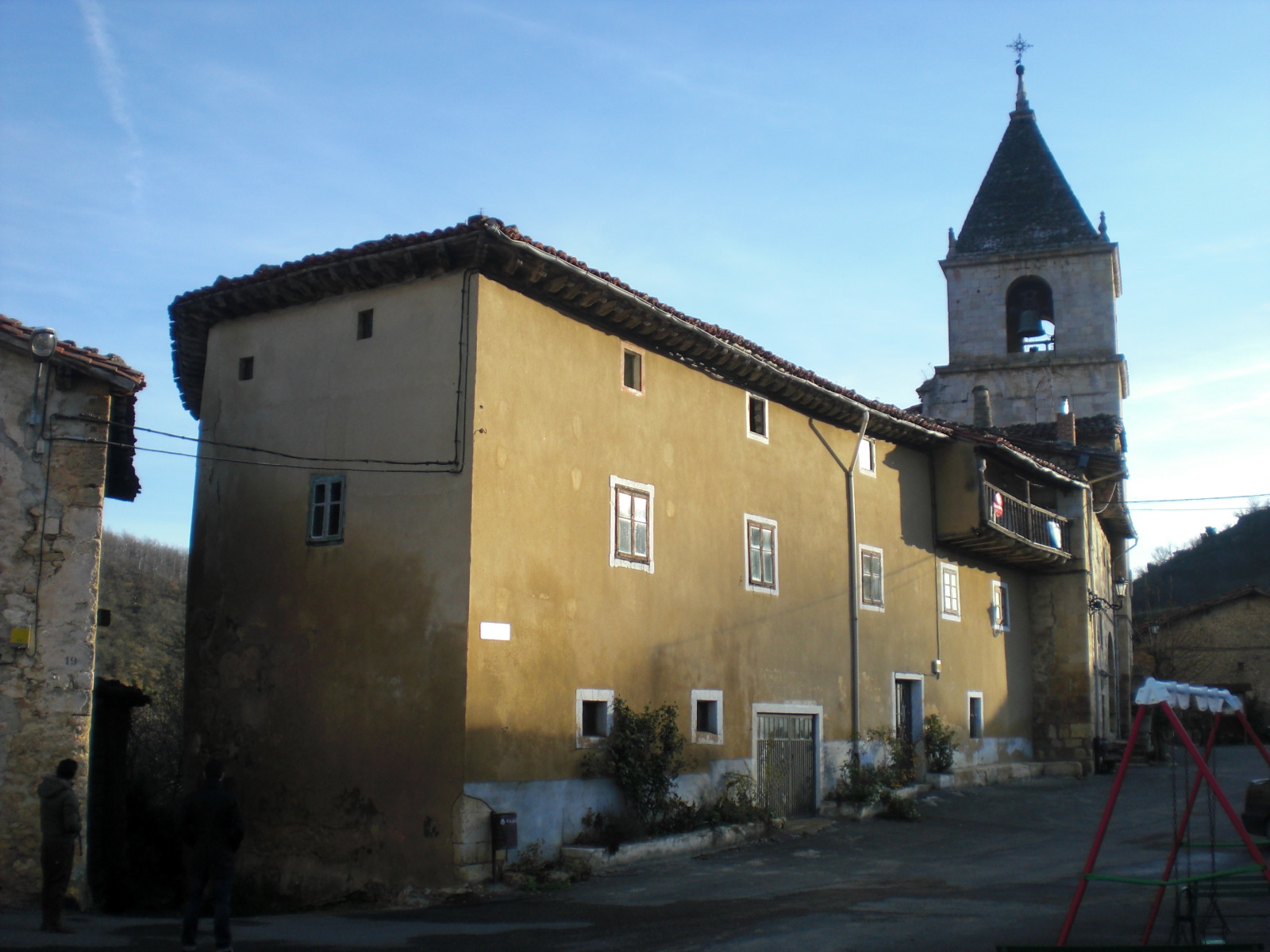
Laño church
