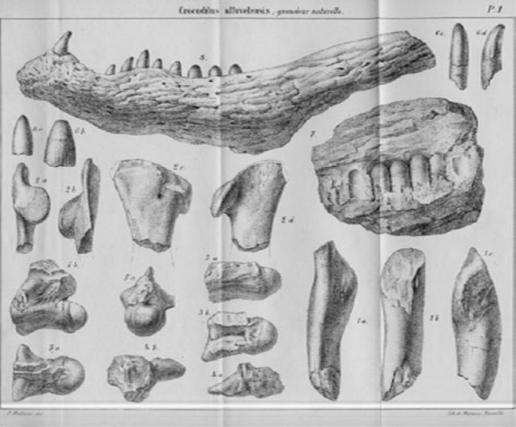
- Illustration of the fossilized remains from the Fuvelian Lignites of France, 1869

Scientific classification
- Kingdom: Animalia
- Phylum: Chordata
- Class: Reptilia
- Clade: Archosauria
- Clade: Pseudosuchia
- Clade: Crocodylomorpha
- Clade: Eusuchia
- Clade: †Allodaposuchidae
- Genus: †Massaliasuchus; Martin & Buffetaut, 2008
- Species: †M. affuvelensis

Binomial name
- †Massaliasuchus affuvelensis (Matheron, 1869)

Synonyms
- Crocodylus affuvelensis Matheron, 1869

= Massaliasuchus =

Massaliasuchus Temporal range: Late Cretaceous, 83.5 Ma

Extinct genus of reptiles

Massaliasuchus is an extinct monospecific genus of allodaposuchid eusuchian crocodyliform from the Late Cretaceous (Santonian–Campanian) Fuvelian Lignites of southeastern France. The type species is M. affuvelensis.

== Systematics ==
Massaliasuchus was first described in 1869 by Philippe Matheron as Crocodilus affuvelensis, based on remains including skull bones. The new genus name was given to it in 2008 by Jeremy Martin and Eric Buffetaut. Massaliasuchus was considered to be related to early alligatoroids. Its name means "Marseille crocodile".

Recent cladistic analysis places Massaliasuchus as a member of Allodaposuchidae, a clade of basal eusuchians from the Late Cretaceous of southern Europe. The genus can be distinguished from Musturzabalsuchus in having 15 alveoli in the dentary. However, Massaliasuchus is usually omitted from phylogenetic analyses since it is only represented by poorly-preserved material.
