= Las Gobas =

Archaeological site in northern Spain

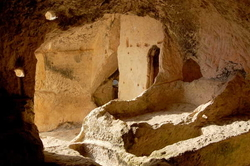

- Location within Spain
- 42.6750°N 2.6275°W
- Type: Artificial caves (used for residence and burial)
- Periods: 7th to the 11th century CE
- Location: Laño, Junta of Castile and León; Burgos, Spain

Las Gobas is a cave settlement and necropolis situated in Laño, Burgos, northern Spain, dating from the 7th to the 11th centuries. The site features 13 artificial caves. Initially, these caves served both residential and burial functions. Over time, however, the settlement transitioned to solely serving funerary and religious purposes, with the inhabitants moving to a new location in Laño.

== Archaeology ==
The name "Las Gobas" specifically refers to a cluster of 13 artificial caves carved into a rocky outcrop. These caves date from the mid-6th century to the 11th century, and they include two churches and a variety of single-room cavities of different sizes.

The site is part of a broader phenomena of medieval cave settlements across Iberia, which have been the subject of much debate regarding their origins and purposes. Archaeological investigations have identified two distinct phases within the Las Gobas necropolis:

=== Phase I (7th–9th centuries CE) ===
This period is characterized by a mixed use of cave architecture and free-standing structures. It includes a church (referred to as Las Gobas-6) and a cemetery with 22 burials. Evidence from this phase indicates an active settlement with signs of daily life and social activities. The construction of domestic structures outside the church during this time suggests a residential character.

=== Phase II (10th–11th centuries CE) ===
In the latter half of the 9th century, the site was abandoned as a living area, and transitioned to solely functioning as a cemetery and place of worship. This change is evidenced by sedimentation layers and the repurposing of a silo as a waste dump. The inhabitants eventually relocated to a new settlement in Laño, distinguishing this phase from the earlier residential use of Las Gobas. Nineteen burials from this period have been discovered at the site.

== Diet ==
The study of isotopic data from Las Boas indicates that local diet was primarily omnivorous, with a strong reliance on terrestrial plant resources, particularly wheat and barley, especially during the later period (10th to 11th centuries). The consumption of millet was more common during the earlier period (7th to 9th centuries).

The population's diet was relatively homogeneous, with minimal differences based on sex or age. However, in the 10th to 11th centuries, women tended to consume a more plant-based diet with less animal protein compared to men. Additionally, higher nitrogen isotope values in infants reflect the weaning process. These findings suggest that the Las Gobas population shared similar dietary practices with other contemporary Christian and Muslim communities in the northern Iberian Peninsula, with no significant divergence in food resources or diet between these groups.

== Genetic studies ==
A 2024 genetic study on 33 individuals buried at Las Goblas revealed family relationships and genetic continuity within a consanguineous population, suggesting that the community maintained close familial ties over generations. Despite the Umayyad invasion and subsequent Islamic rule in Iberia, there was no significant increase in North African or Middle Eastern ancestries detected among the individuals analyzed. This suggests that the community at Las Gobas remained relatively isolated during this period.

Additionally, the presence of zoonotic diseases, including an individual infected with a variola virus related to the northern European variola complex, indicating a close interaction between humans and animals within this population.
