= Systema Naturae =

Major work by botanist Carolus Linnaeus

Systema Naturæ
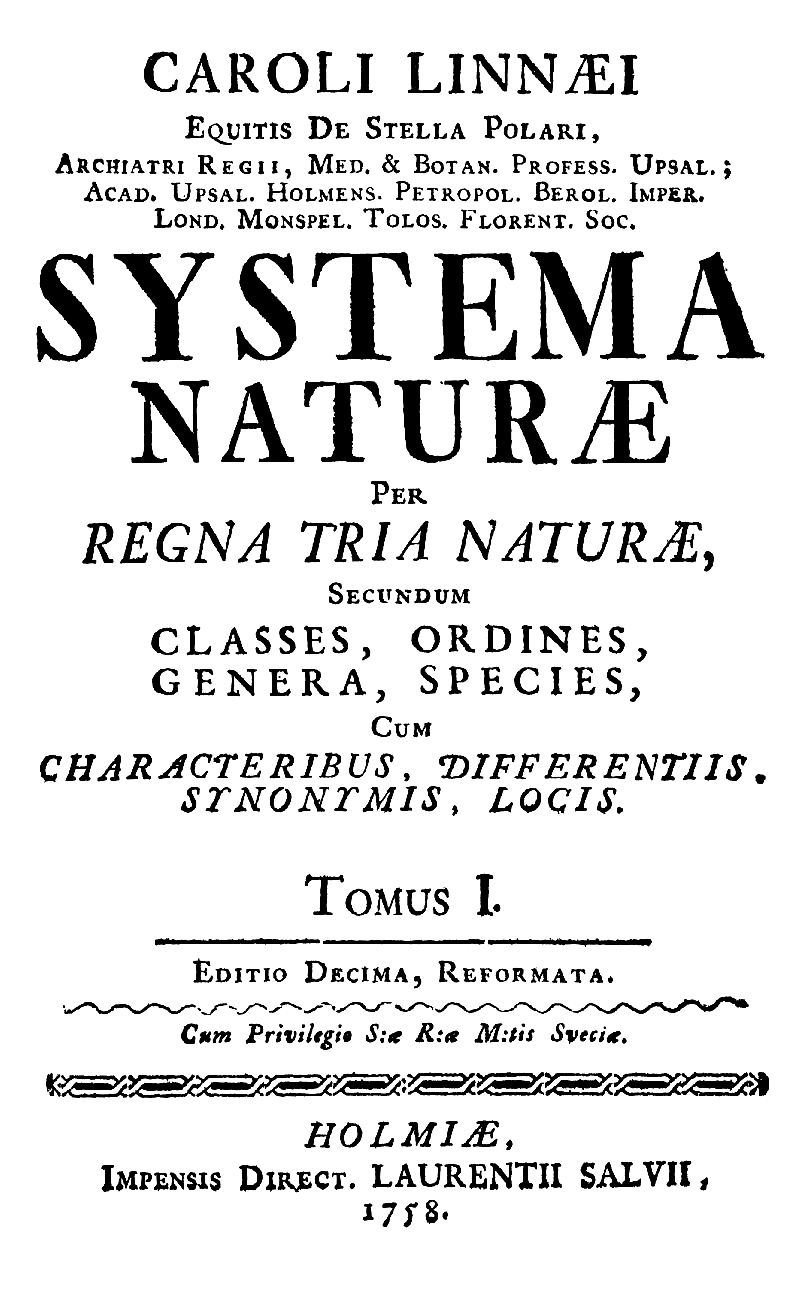
- Title page of the 1758 edition of Linnaeus's Systema Naturæ
- Author: Carl Linnaeus (Carl von Linné)
- Subject: Taxonomy
- Genre: Biological classification
- Publication date: 1735–1793
- LC Class: QH43 .S21

Systema Naturae (originally in Latin written Systema Naturæ with the ligature æ) is one of the major works of Swedish botanist, zoologist, and physician Carl Linnaeus (1707–1778) and introduced the Linnaean taxonomy. Although the system, now known as binomial nomenclature, was partially developed by the Bauhin brothers, Gaspard and Johann, Linnaeus was the first to use it consistently throughout his book. The first edition was published in 1735. The full title of the 10th edition (1758), which was the most important one, was Systema naturæ per regna tria naturæ, secundum classes, ordines, genera, species, cum characteribus, differentiis, synonymis, locis, which appeared in English in 1806 with the title: "A General System of Nature, Through the Three Grand Kingdoms of Animals, Vegetables, and Minerals, Systematically Divided Into their Several Classes, Orders, Genera, Species, and Varieties, with their Habitations, Manners, Economy, Structure and Peculiarities".

The tenth edition of this book (1758), published in Stockholm, is considered the starting point of zoological nomenclature. In 1766–1768 Linnaeus published the much enhanced 12th edition, the last under his authorship. Another again enhanced work in the same style titled "Systema Naturae" was published by Johann Friedrich Gmelin between 1788 and 1793. Since at least the early 20th century, zoologists have commonly recognized this as the last edition belonging to this series.

== Overview ==
Linnaeus (later known as "Carl von Linné", after his ennoblement in 1761) published the first edition of Systema Naturae in 1735, during his stay in the Netherlands. As was customary for the scientific literature of its day, the book was published in Latin. In it, he outlined his ideas for the hierarchical classification of the natural world, dividing it into the animal kingdom (regnum animale), the plant kingdom (regnum vegetabile), and the "mineral kingdom" (regnum lapideum).

Linnaeus's Systema Naturae lists only about 10,000 species of organisms, of which about 6,000 are plants and 4,236 are animals. According to the historian of botany William T. Stearn, "Even in 1753, he believed that the number of species of plants in the whole world would hardly reach 10,000; in his whole career, he named about 7,700 species of flowering plants."

Linnaeus developed his classification of the plant kingdom in an attempt to describe and understand the natural world as a reflection of the logic of God's creation. His sexual system, where species with the same number of stamens were treated in the same group, was convenient, but in his view artificial. Linnaeus believed in God's creation and that no deeper relationships were to be expressed. The classification of animals was more natural than for plants. For instance, humans were for the first time placed together with other primates, as Anthropomorpha. They were also divided into four varieties, as distinguished by skin color and corresponding with the four known continents and temperaments. The tenth edition expanded on these varieties with behavioral and cultural traits that the Linnean Society acknowledges as having cemented colonial stereotypes and provided one of the foundations for scientific racism.

As a result of the popularity of the work, and the number of new specimens sent to him from around the world, Linnaeus kept publishing new and ever-expanding editions of his work. It grew from 11 very large pages in the first edition (1735) to 2,400 pages in the 12th edition (1766–1768). Also, as the work progressed, he made changes; in the first edition, whales were classified as fishes, following the work of Linnaeus' friend and "father of ichthyology" Peter Artedi; in the 10th edition, published in 1758, whales were moved into the mammal class. In this same edition, he introduced two-part names (see binomen) for animal species, which he had done for plant species (see binary name) in the 1753 publication of Species Plantarum. The system eventually developed into modern Linnaean taxonomy, a hierarchically organized biological classification.

After Linnaeus' health declined in the early 1770s, publication of editions of Systema Naturae went in two directions. Another Swedish scientist, Johan Andreas Murray, issued the Regnum Vegetabile section separately in 1774 as the Systema Vegetabilium, confusingly labelled the 13th edition. Meanwhile, a 13th edition of the entire Systema appeared in parts between 1788 and 1793. It was as the Systema Vegetabilium that Linnaeus' work became widely known in England following translation from the Latin by the Lichfield Botanical Society, as A System of Vegetables (1783–1785).

== Taxonomy ==
In his Imperium Naturæ, Linnaeus established three kingdoms, namely Regnum Animale, Regnum Vegetabile, and Regnum Lapideum. This approach, the Animal, Vegetable, and Mineral Kingdoms, survives until today in the popular mind, notably in the form of parlour games: "Is it animal, vegetable or mineral?" The classification was based on five levels: kingdom, class, order, genus, and species. While species and genus were seen as God-given (or "natural"), the three higher levels were seen by Linnaeus as constructs. The concept behind the set ranks being applied to all groups was to make a system that was easy to remember and navigate, a task in which most say he succeeded.

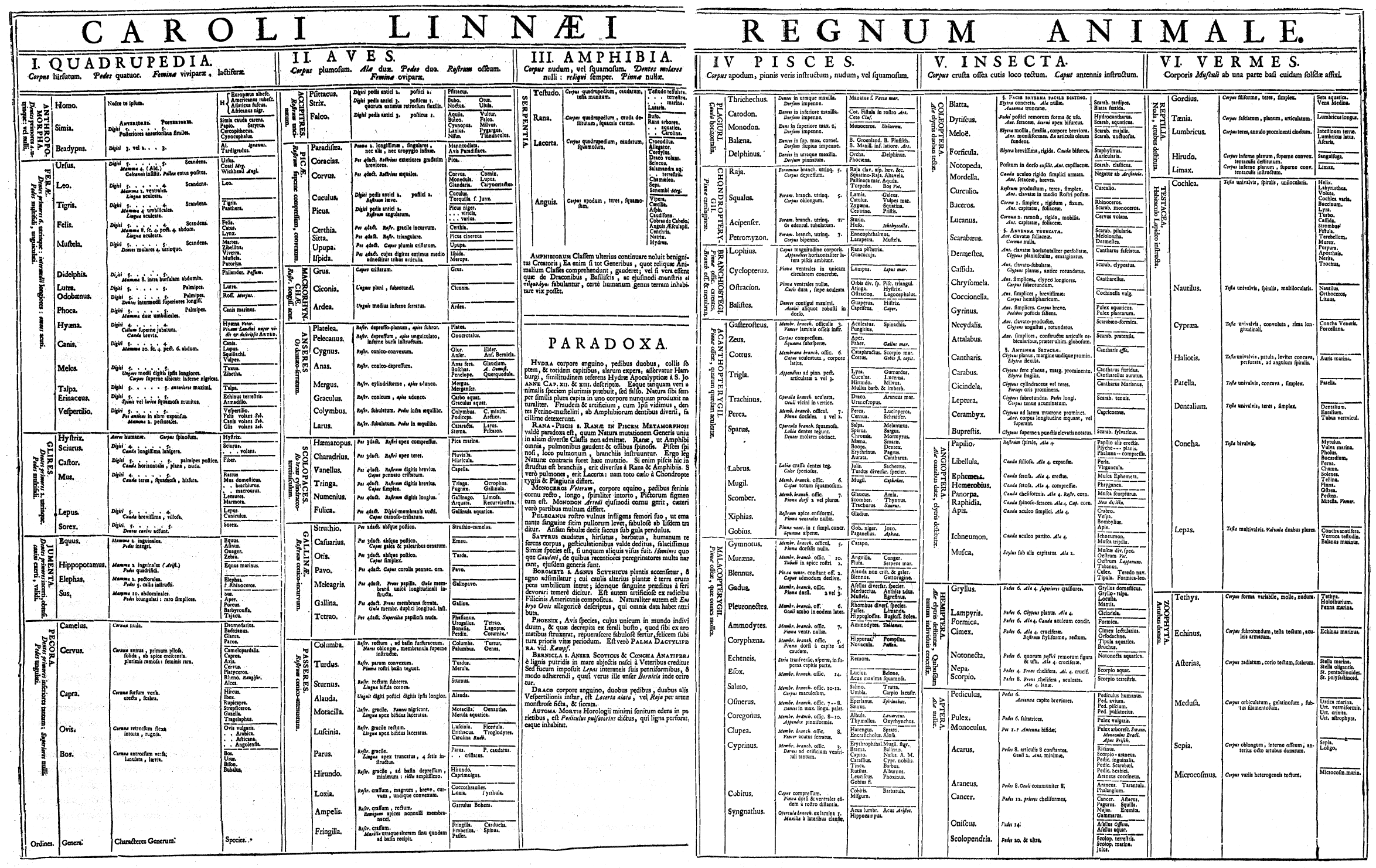
The 1735 classification of animals

Linnaeus's work had a huge impact on science; it was indispensable as a foundation for biological nomenclature, now regulated by the Nomenclature Codes. Two of his works, the first edition of the Species Plantarum (1753) for plants and the 10th edition of the Systema Naturæ (1758), are accepted to be among the starting points of nomenclature. Most of his names for species and genera were published at very early dates and thus take priority over those of other, later authors. Zoology has one exception, which is a monograph on Swedish spiders, Svenska Spindlar, published by Carl Clerck in 1757, so the names established there take priority over the Linnean names. His exceptional importance to science was less in the value of his taxonomy, but more in his deployment of skillful young students abroad to collect specimens. At the close of the 18th century, his system had effectively become the standard for biological classification.

=== Animals ===
Only in the animal kingdom is the higher taxonomy of Linnaeus still more or less recognizable and some of these names are still in use, but usually not quite for the same groups as used by Linnaeus. He divided the animal kingdom into six classes; in the tenth edition (1758), these were:

1. Mammalia comprised the mammals. In the first edition, whales and the West Indian manatee were classified among the fishes.
2. Aves comprised the birds. Linnaeus was the first to remove bats from the birds and classify them under mammals.
3. Amphibia comprised amphibians, reptiles, and assorted fishes that are not of Osteichthyes.
4. Pisces comprised the bony fishes. These included the spiny-finned fishes (Perciformes) as a separate order.
5. Insecta comprised all arthropods. Crustaceans, arachnids and myriapods were included as the order "Aptera".
6. Vermes comprised the remaining invertebrates, roughly divided into "worms", molluscs, and hard-shelled organisms such as echinoderms.

==== Humans ====
Linnaeus was one of the first scientists to classify humans as primates (originally Anthropomorpha for "manlike"), eliciting some controversy for placing people among animals, thus not ruling over nature. He distinguished humans (Homo sapiens) from Homo troglodytes, a species of human-like creatures with exaggerated or non-human characteristics, despite finding limited evidence. He divided Homo sapiens into four varieties, corresponding with the four known continents and four temperaments (some editions also classify Ferus wild children and Monstrosus monstrous to accommodate adaptations to extreme environments). The first edition included Europæus albescens (whitish Europeans), Americanus rubescens (reddish Americans), Asiaticus fuscus (tawny Asians), and Africanus nigriculus (blackish Africans). The 10th edition solidified these descriptions by removing the "ish" qualifiers (e.g. albus "white" instead of albescens "whitish") and revising the characterization of Asiaticus from fuscus (tawny) to luridus (pale yellow). It also incorporates behavioral and cultural traits that the Linnean Society recognizes as having cemented colonial stereotypes and provided one of the foundations for scientific racism.

=== Plants ===
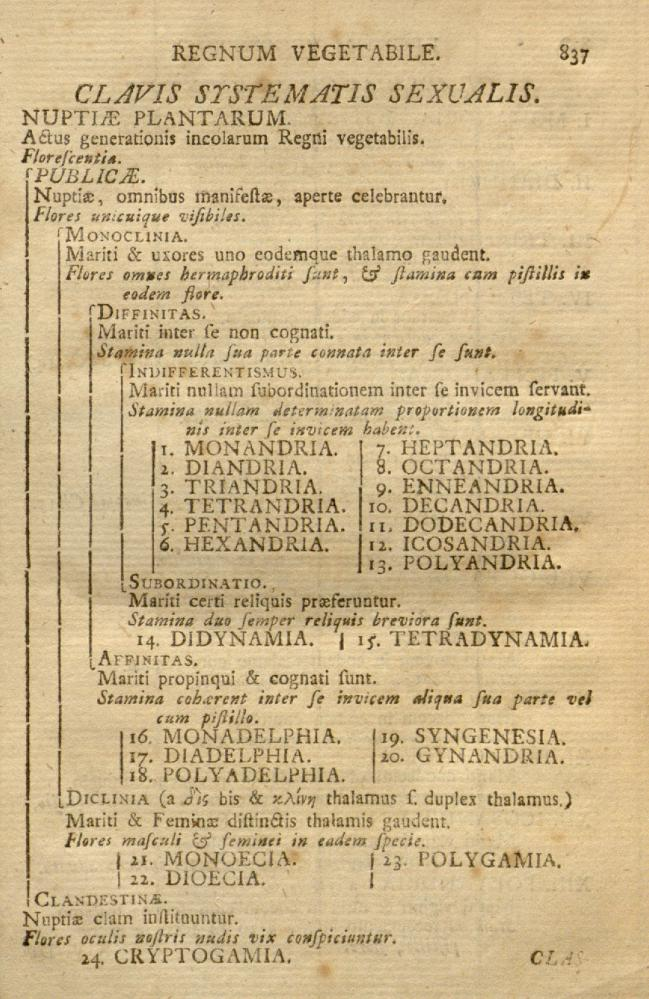
Key to the Sexual System from the 10th (1758) edition of Systema Naturæ

The orders and classes of plants, according to his Systema Sexuale, were never intended to represent natural groups (as opposed to his ordines naturales in his Philosophia Botanica), but only for use in identification. They were used in that sense well into the 19th century.

The Linnaean classes for plants, in the Sexual System, were:

- Classis 1. Monandria
- Classis 2. Diandria
- Classis 3. Triandria
- Classis 4. Tetrandria
- Classis 5. Pentandria
- Classis 6. Hexandria
- Classis 7. Heptandria
- Classis 8. Octandria
- Classis 9. Enneandria
- Classis 10. Decandria
- Classis 11. Dodecandria
- Classis 12. Icosandria
- Classis 13. Polyandra
- Classis 14. Didynamia
- Classis 15. Tetradynamia
- Classis 16. Monadelphia
- Classis 17. Diadelphia
- Classis 18. Polyadelphia
- Classis 19. Syngenesia
- Classis 20. Gynandria
- Classis 21. Monoecia
- Classis 22. Dioecia
- Classis 23. Polygamia
- Classis 24. Cryptogamia

=== Minerals ===
Linnaeus's taxonomy of minerals has long since fallen out of use. In the 10th edition, 1758, of the Systema Naturæ, the Linnaean classes were:

- Classis 1. Petræ (rocks)
- Classis 2. Mineræ (minerals and ores)
- Classis 3. Fossilia (fossils and aggregates)

== Editions ==
Gmelin's 13th (decima tertia) edition of Systema Naturae (1788–1793) should be carefully distinguished from the more limited Systema Vegetabilium first prepared and published by Johan Andreas Murray in 1774 (but labelled as "thirteenth edition").

Edition	Location	Year	Complete bibliographical citation	Links to online versions
1	Leiden	1735	Linnæus, C. 1735. Systema naturæ, sive regna tria naturæ systematice proposita per classes, ordines, genera, & species. – pp. [1–12]. Lugduni Batavorum. (Haak)	Missouri Botanical Garden
2	Stockholm	1740	Linnæus, C. 1740. Systema naturæ in quo naturæ regna tria, secundum classes, ordines, genera, species, systematice proponuntur. Editio secunda, auctior. – pp. [1–2], 1–80. Stockholmiæ. (Kiesewetter)	Internet Archive
3	Halle	1740	Lange, J. J. 1740. Caroli Linnaei systema natvrae, sive Regna tria natvrae systematice proposita per classes, ordines, genera et species. Caroli Linnaei Natur-Systema, oder die in ordentlichem Zusammenhange vorgetragene drey Reiche der Natur nach ihren Classen, Ordnungen, Geschlechtern und Arten, in die deutsche Sprache übersetzet und mit einer Vorrede herausgegeben von Johann Joachim Langen. – pp. [1–8], 1–70, [1]. Halle. (Gebauer)	Bayerische Staatsbibliothek
4	Paris	1744	Linnæus, C. 1744. Systema naturæ in quo proponuntur naturæ regna tria secundum classes, ordines, genera & species. Editio quarta ab auctore emendata & aucta. Accesserunt nomina Gallica. – pp. i–xxvi, [1], 1–108. Parisiis. (David.)	Google Books; CSIC Madrid
5	Halle	1747	Agnethler, M. G. 1747. Caroli Linnæi systema natvræ in qvo natvræ regna tria, secvndvm classes, ordines, genera, species, systematice proponvntvr. Recvsvm et societatis, qvæ impensas contvlit, vsvi accommodatvm. Editio altera avctior et emendatior. – pp. 1–88. Halæ Magdebvrgicæ.	Bayerische Staatsbibliothek
6	Stockholm	1748	Linnæus, C. 1748. Systema naturæ sistens regna tria naturæ, in classes et ordines, genera et species redacta tabulisque æneis illustrata. Editio sexta, emendata et aucta. – pp. [1–3], 1–224, [1–18], Tab. I–VIII. Stockholmiæ. (Kiesewetter)	SUB Göttingen
7	Leipzig	1748	Linnæus, C. 1748. Systema naturæ sistens regna tria naturæ, in classes et ordines, genera et species redacta tabulisque æneis illustrata. Secundum sextam Stockholmiensem emendatam & auctam editionem. – pp. [A], [1–5], 1–224, [1–22], Tab. I–VIII. Lipsiae. (Kiesewetter)	Bayerische Staatsbibliothek
8	Stockholm	1753	Haartman, J. J. 1753. Caroli Linnæi Indelning i Ö̈rt-Riket, efter Systema Naturae, på Swenska öfwersatt af Johan J. Haartman. – pp. [1–12], 1–136, [1–8]. Stockholm. (Salvius)	Umeå UB
9	Leiden	1756	Linnæus, C. 1756. Systema naturæ sistens regna tria naturæ in classes et ordines, genera et species redacta, tabulisque æneis illustrata. Accedunt vocabula gallica. Editio multo auctior & emendatior. – pp. [1–7], 1–227, [1–19], Tab. I–VIII. Lugduni Batavorum. (Haak)	New York Botanical Garden; Bayerische Staatsbibliothek
10, Vol. 1	Stockholm	1758	Linnæus, C. 1758. Systema naturæ per regna tria naturæ, secundum classes, ordines, genera, species, cum characteribus, differentiis, synonymis, locis. Tomus I. Editio decima, reformata. – pp. [1–4], 1–824. Holmiæ. (Salvius)	Bayerische Staatsbibliothek; SUB Göttingen; Missouri Botanical Garden
10, Vol. 2	Stockholm	1759	Linnæus, C. 1759. Systema naturæ per regna tria naturæ, secundum classes, ordines, genera, species, cum characteribus, differentiis, synonymis, locis. Tomus II. Editio decima, reformata. – pp. [1–4], 825–1384. Holmiæ. (Salvius)	Missouri Botanical Garden
11, Vol. 1	Halle	1760	Linnaeus, C. 1760. Systema natvrae per regna tria natvrae, secvndvm classes, ordines, genera, species, cvm characteribvs, differentiis, synonymis, locis. Tomvs I. Praefactvs est Ioannes Ioachimvs Langivs. Ad editionem decimam reformatam Holmiensem. – pp. [1–8], 1–824. Halae Magdebvrgicae. (Curt). (Linnæus 1758: p. 5 recorded probably this edition as from Leipzig 1762, "nil additum" = nothing added)	New York Botanical Garden (pp. [1–8], 1–338); New York Botanical Garden (pp. 339–824)
12, Vol. 1, part 1	Stockholm	1766	Linné, C. a 1766. Systema naturæ per regna tria naturæ, secundum classes, ordines, genera, species, cum characteribus, differentiis, synonymis, locis. Tomus I. Editio duodecima, reformata. – pp. 1–532. Holmiæ. (Salvius)	SUB Göttingen; Bayerische Staatsbibliothek
12, Vol. 1, part 2	Stockholm	1767	Linné, C. a 1767. Systema naturæ, Tom. I. Pars II. Editio duodecima reformata. – pp. 533–1327, [1–37]. Holmiæ. (Salvius)	SUB Göttingen; Bayerische Staatsbibliothek
12, Vol. 2	Stockholm	1767	Linné, C. a 1767. Systema naturæ per regna tria naturæ, secundum classes, ordines, genera, species, cum characteribus & differentiis. Tomus II. – pp. 1–735, [1–16], 1–142, [1–2]. Holmiæ. (Salvius)	
12, Vol. 3	Stockholm	1768	Linné, C. a 1768. Systema naturæ per regna tria naturæ, secundum classes, ordines, genera, species, cum characteribus & differentiis. Tomus III. – pp. 1–236, [1–20], Tab. I–III. Holmiæ. (Salvius)	SUB Göttingen
12a ("13"), Vol. 1, part. 1	Vienna	1767	Linné, C. a 1767. Systema naturæ per regna tria naturae, secundum classes, ordines, genera, species cum characteribus, differentiis, synonymis, locis. Tomus I. Editio decima tertia, ad editionem duodecimam reformatam Holmiensem. – pp. 1–532. Vindobonae. (Trattnern)	NCSU Libraries; Missouri Botanical Garden; Google Books
12a ("13"), Vol. 1, part 2	Vienna	1767	Linné, C. a [1767]. Systema naturæ. Tom. I. Pars II. – pp. [1–2], 1–1327, [1–37]. Vindobonae. (Trattnern)	NCSU Libraries; Missouri Botanical Garden; Google Books
12a ("13"), Vol. 2	Vienna	1770	Linné, C. a 1770. Systema natvrae per regna tria natvrae, secvndvm classes, ordines, genera, species cvm characteribvs, et differentiis. Tomvs II. Editio decima tertia, ad editionem duodecimam reformatam Holmiensem. – 1–736, [1–6]. Vindobonae. (Trattnern)	NCSU Libraries; Missouri Botanical Garden; New York Botanical Garden; Google Books
12a ("13"), Vol. 3	Vienna	1770	Linnaeus, C. 1770. Systema natvrae per regna tria natvrae, secvndvm classes, ordines, genera, species cvm characteribvs, et differentiis. Tomvs III. – 1–236, [1–19]. Vindobonae. (Trattnern)	NCSU Libraries; Missouri Botanical Garden; Google Books
12b, Vol. 1	Göttingen	1772	Beckmann, J. 1772. Caroli a Linné systema naturae ex editione duodecima in epitomen redactum et praelectionibus academicis accommodatum a Iohanne Beckmanno. Tomus I. Regnum Animale. – pp. [1–5], 1–240, [1–10]. Gottingae. (Vandenhoeck)	NCSU Libraries
12b, Vol. 2	Göttingen	1772	Beckmann, J. 1772. Caroli a Linné systema naturae ex editione duodecima in epitomen redactum et praelectionibus academicis accommodatum a Iohanne Beckmanno. Tomus II. Regnum Vegetabile. – pp. 1–356, [1–32]. Gottingae. (Vandenhoeck)	NCSU Libraries
13, Vol. 1, part 1	Leipzig	1788	Gmelin, J. F. 1788. Caroli a Linné systema naturae per regna tria naturae, secundum classes, ordines, genera, species, cum characteribus, differentiis, synonymis, locis. Tomus I. Editio decima tertia, aucta, reformata. – pp. [1–12], 1–500. Lipsiae. (Beer)	Missouri Botanical Garden; NCSU Libraries
13, Vol. 1, part 2	Leipzig	[1789]	Gmelin, J. F. [1789]. Caroli a Linné, systema naturae. Tom. I. Pars II. – pp. 501–1032. Lipsiae. (Beer)	Missouri Botanical Garden; NCSU Libraries
13, Vol. 1, part 3	Leipzig	[1789]	Gmelin, J. F. [1789]. Caroli a Linné, systema naturae. Tom. I. Pars III. – pp. 1033–1516. Lipsiae. (Beer)	Missouri Botanical Garden; NCSU Libraries
13, Vol. 1, part 4	Leipzig	[1790]	Gmelin, J. F. [1790]. Caroli a Linné, systema naturae. Tom. I. Pars IV. – pp. 1517–2224. Lipsiae. (Beer)	Missouri Botanical Garden; NCSU Libraries
13, Vol. 1, part 5	Leipzig	[1790]	Gmelin, J. F. [1790]. Caroli a Linné, systema naturae. Tom. I. Pars V. – pp. 2225–3020. Lipsiae. (Beer)	Missouri Botanical Garden; NCSU Libraries
13, Vol. 1, part 6	Leipzig	[1791]	Gmelin, J. F. [1791]. Caroli a Linné, systema naturae. Tom. I. Pars VI. – pp. 3021–3910. Lipsiae. (Beer)	Missouri Botanical Garden; NCSU Libraries
13, Vol. 1, part 7	Leipzig	[1792]	Gmelin, J. F. [1792]. Caroli a Linné, systema naturae. Tom. I. Pars VII. – pp. [1], 3911–4120. Lipsiae. (Beer)	Missouri Botanical Garden
13, Vol. 2, part 1	Leipzig	1791	Gmelin, J. F. 1791. Caroli a Linné systema naturae per regna tria naturae, secundum classes, ordines, genera, species, cum characteribus et differentiis. Tomus II. Editio decima tertia, aucta, reformata. – pp. [1], I–XL, 1–884. Lipsiae. (Beer)	Missouri Botanical Garden; NCSU Libraries; Bayerische Staatsbibliothek
13, Vol. 2, part 2	Leipzig	[1791]?	Caroli a Linné, systema naturae. Tom. II. Pars II. – pp. [1], 885–1661, [1]. Lipsiae. (Beer)	Missouri Botanical Garden; Bayerische Staatsbibliothek
13, Vol. 3	Leipzig	1793	Gmelin, J. F. 1793. Caroli a Linné (...) systema naturae per regna tria naturae, secundum classes, ordines, genera, species, cum characteribus et differentiis. Tomus III. Editio decima tertia, aucta, reformata. – pp. 1–476. Lipsiae. (Beer)	Missouri Botanical Garden; NCSU Libraries; Bayerische Staatsbibliothek

The dates of publication for Gmelin's edition were the following:

- Part 1: pp. [1–12], 1–500 (25 July 1788)
- Part 2: pp. 501–1032 (20 April 1789)
- Part 3: pp. 1033–1516 (20 November 1789)
- Part 4: pp. 1517–2224 (21 May 1790)
- Part 5: pp. 2225–3020 (6 December 1790)
- Part 6: pp. 3021–3910 (14 May 1791)
- Part 7: pp. 3911–4120 (2 July 1792)

== See also ==
- Supplementum Plantarum
- Animalia Paradoxa
- 10th edition of Systema Naturae
- 12th edition of Systema Naturae
- Systema Vegetabilium
- English edition by William Turton, translated from Gmelin's last edition. https://doi.org/10.5962/bhl.title.37018

== Bibliography ==
In Latin

- Linné, Carl von (1774). Murray, Johann Andreas (ed.). Systema vegetabilium (13th edition of Systema Naturae) (2 vols.). Göttingen: Typis et impensis Jo. Christ. Dieterich.
  - Linné, Carl von (1785) [1774]. Systema vegetabilium (13th edition of Systema Naturae) [A System of Vegetables 2 vols.]. Lichfield: Lichfield Botanical Society.

In English translation

- A General System of Nature translated by William Turton. Lackington, Allen, and Company, January 1806
