= Bestiae =

Defunct taxon

Bestiae is a defunct taxon that contained pigs, armadillos, hedgehogs, moles, shrews, and opossums. It was defined by Linnaeus in its 1758's Systema Naturae as "quadrupedal mammals having several front teeth, and more than a pair or laniary (i.e. canine) teeth".
