= Anthropomorpha =

Obsolete primate taxon

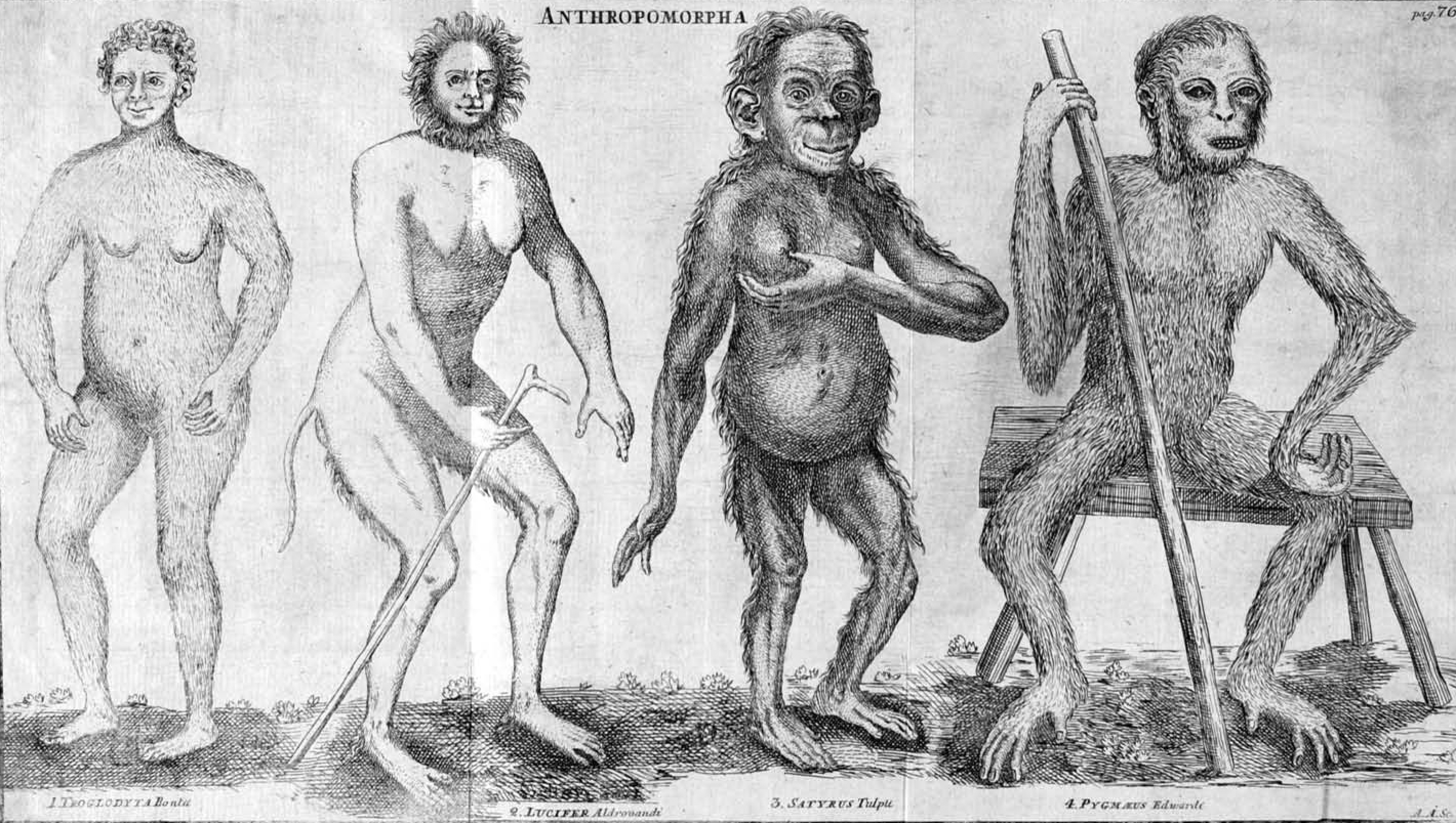
Anthropomorpha, from the 1760 dissertation by C. E. Hoppius: 1. Troglodyta Bontii, 2. Lucifer Aldrovandi, 3. Satyrus Tulpii, 4. Pygmaeus Edwardi

Anthropomorpha (original spelling: Antropomorpha) is a defunct taxon but a former name of the order Primates.

The order was established by Carl Linnaeus in the first edition of his book Systema Naturae (1735) for genera Homo (humans), Simia (monkeys and apes in general) and Bradypus (sloths). The taxon is notable for the history of human taxonomy as the first to combine apes (Linnaeus' Simia) and humans under the same clade.

In the 1758 edition of the same book, Linnaeus discarded this name and began to use the word Primates, which has replaced Anthropomorpha completely. A dissertation on the Anthropomorpha was published by Linnaeus' student Christian Emmanuel Hoppius in 1760.

The name is no longer considered valid, as the animals that were included within Anthropomorpha are now believed to belong to multiple clades. For example, two-toed sloths were included within Anthropomorpha, but are now considered to be in the family Choloepodidae, which is not closely related to the primates. Comte de Buffon correctly rejected the combination of sloths and primates within the same order.
