= Tertiates =

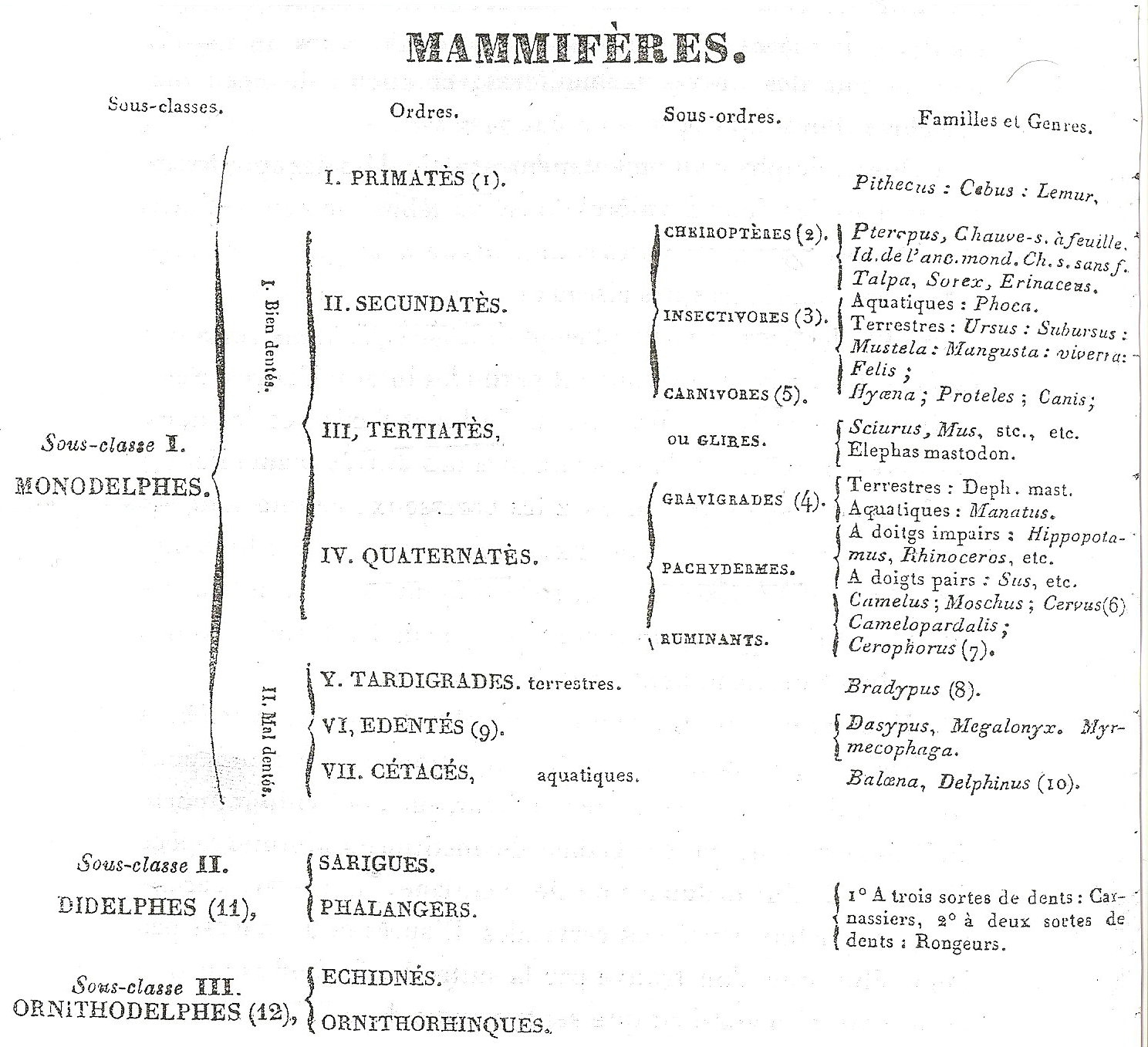
Nouvelle classification des Mammifères (1839)

Tertiates is an obsolete order of mammals created by Henri-Marie Ducrotay de Blainville in 1839, imitating Linnean nomenclature (Primates). It included the suborder Glires.

== See also ==
- Secundates
- Quaternates
