= Secundates =

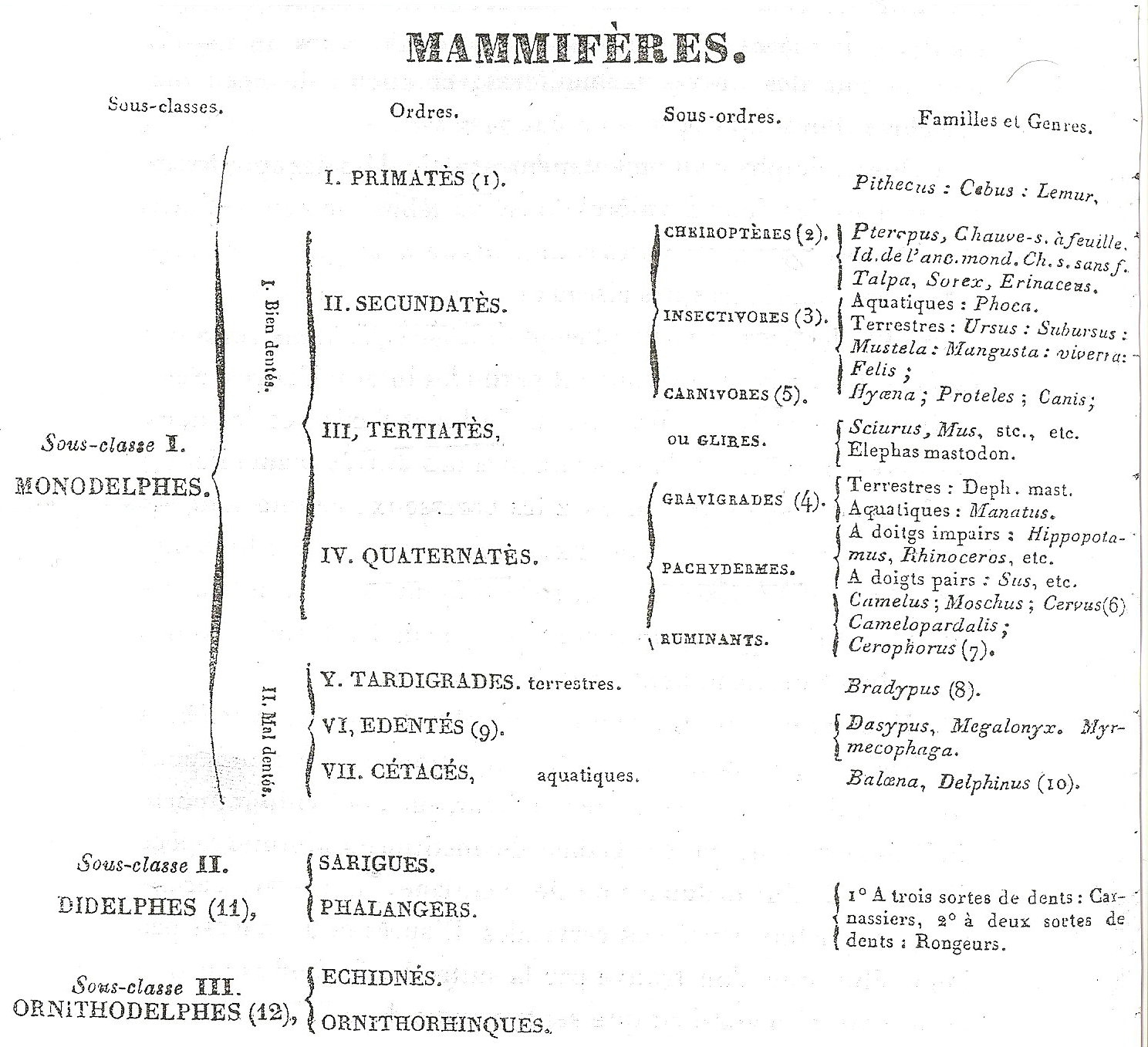
Nouvelle classification des Mammifères (1839)

Secundates is an obsolete order of mammals created by Henri-Marie Ducrotay de Blainville in 1839, imitating Linnean nomenclature (Primates). It included the suborders Chiroptera, Insectivora and Carnivora.

== See also ==
- Tertiates
- Quaternates
