= Bionta =

Defunct taxon

Bionta is a defunct taxon created by Lee Barker Walton in 1930, to denominate all the living beings. It was divided up into three subkingdoms; Protistodeae, Metaphytodeae (multicellular plants), and Zoodeae (multicellular animals).

== See also ==
- Aphanobionta
- Biota (taxonomy)
- Cytota
