= Quaternates =

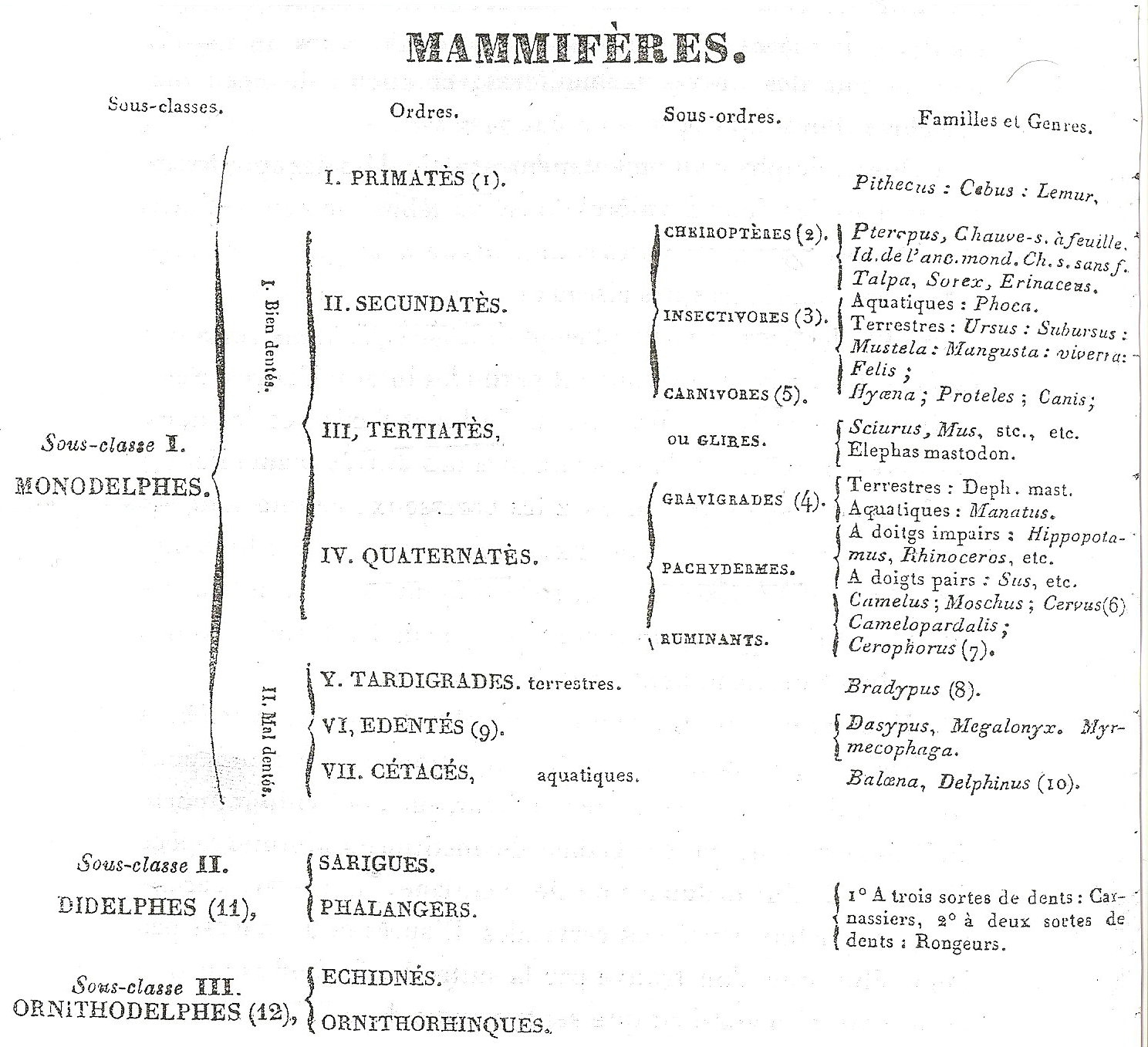
Nouvelle classification des Mammifères (1839)

Quaternates is an obsolete order of mammals created by Henri-Marie Ducrotay de Blainville in 1839, imitating Linnean nomenclature (Primates). It included the suborders Gravigrada, Pachydermata, and Ruminantia.

== See also ==
- Secundates
- Tertiates
