= Taxonomy mnemonic =

Technique for remembering Linnean groups

The hierarchy of scientific classification

Several mnemonics are used to memorize the hierarchical order of taxa used in biological taxonomy. Such mnemonics are usually constructed with a series of words that begin with the letters KPCOFGS, corresponding to the initials of the primary taxonomic ranks. Words beginning with D (corresponding to "domain") are sometimes added to the beginning of the sequence; words beginning with S (corresponding to "subspecies") are sometimes added at the end of the sequence.

One common mnemonic is "King Philip Came Over From Great Spain." A variant (recorded as early as 2002) that adds a letter for domain is "Dear King Phillip [sic] Came Over From Great Spain."

Mnemonic	Common prefix	Taxon
Dear	D	Domain
King	King	Kingdom
Philip	Ph	Phylum
Came	C	Class
Over	O	Order
From	F	Family
Great	G	Genus
Spain	Sp	Species

Possibly earlier variations (both recorded in print from 1977) are "King Philip came over for grandma's suitcase" and "King Philip came over for ginger snaps." Many other variations on the final two words exist: "grape soda," "good spaghetti," "golf sticks," etc.

Other published mnemonics include:

- "Keep pond clean or fish get sick"
- "Drunken kangaroos punch children on family game shows" — seen on an episode titled "Game Theory: Yoshi's Identity Crisis! What is a Yoshi?" of the YouTube series "The Game Theorists"
- "Dear Kevin, please come over for gay sex" — seen on Community S3E16 "Virtual Systems Analysis"

== In botany ==
Botanical taxonomy uses the rank of division in place of phylum. Some botany mnemonics follow one of the "King Philip" variants, with David in place of Philip.
