= Proteomyxa =

Proteomyxa is a name given by E. Ray Lankester to a group of Sarcodina. This is an obsolete group. a small order of obscure rhizopods of uncertain relationships usually possessing flagella at some stage of their life.

Many of the species are endoparasites in living cells, mostly of algae or fungi, but not exclusively. At least two species of Pseudospora have been taken for reproductive stages in the life history of their hosts—whence indeed the generic name. Plasmodiophora brassicae gives rise to the disease known as Hanburies or fingers and toes in Cruciferae; Lymphosporidium causes a virulent epidemic among the American brook trout (Salvelinus fontinalis). Archerina boltoni is remarkable for containing a pair of chlorophyll corpuscles in each cell; no nucleus has been made out, but the chlorophyll bodies divide previous to fission. It is a fresh-water form. The cells of this species form loose aggregates or filoplasmodia, like those of Mikrogromia or Leydenia.
