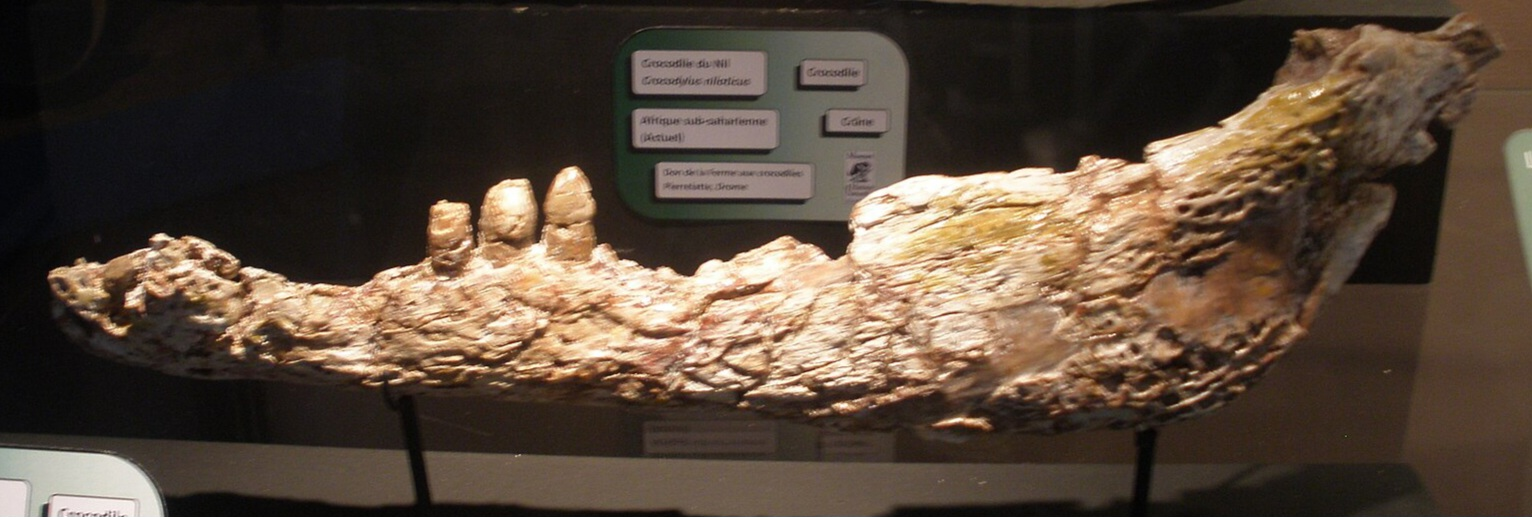
- Holotype jaw of M. buffetauti

Scientific classification
- Kingdom: Animalia
- Phylum: Chordata
- Class: Reptilia
- Clade: Pseudosuchia
- Clade: Crocodylomorpha
- Clade: †Allodaposuchidae
- Genus: †Musturzabalsuchus; Buscalioni et al., 1997
- Species: †M. buffetauti

Binomial name
- †Musturzabalsuchus buffetauti Buscalioni et al., 1997

= Musturzabalsuchus =

Musturzabalsuchus Temporal range: Late Cretaceous, ?Campanian–Maastrichtian

Extinct genus of reptiles

Musturzabalsuchus is an extinct monospecific genus of allodaposuchid eusuchian crocodyliform. The type and only species is Musturzabalsuchus buffetauti.

== Etymology ==
The generic name means "broadened rostrum crocodile", with "Musturzabal" meaning "broadened rostrum" in Basque and "suchus" meaning "crocodile" in Greek. The type and only species is M. buffetauti, named after the French paleoherpetologist Eric Buffetaut.

== Discovery ==
The material first assigned to Musturzabalsuchus in 1997 has been found from the locality of Laño in Condado de Treviño, northern Spain. Although dating back to the Late Cretaceous, the exact age of the strata in which material of Musturzabalsuchus occurs in the locality is not known: it is either Late Campanian or very Early Maastrichtian. Despite the unusually high quantity of remains belonging to the genus, the only skeletal elements known from Musturzabalsuchus are the maxilla and mandible. Some fragments of these bones have been found from the locality of Armuña in the province of Segovia that were previously referred to an unnamed trematochampsid. Like the holotype and paratype material found from Laño, these fossils, known collectively as UPUAM-502, are Campano-Maastrichtian in age.

Another specimen (MHNM 10834.0) from the Fuvelian Lignites of France has been referred to Musturzabalsuchus in 1999. However, the characteristics used to assign the material to better-known specimens of Musturzabalsuchus from Spain were questioned in a later 2008 study.

Material from Musturzabalsuchus has been found more recently from Valencia, Spain, being slightly older in age than specimens from other localities, dating back to the Early or Middle Campanian.

== Classification ==
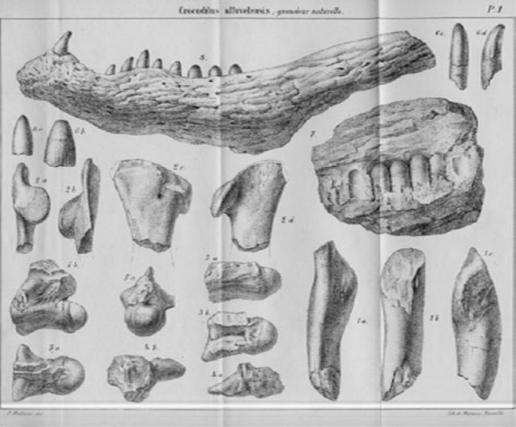
Illustration of the remains of "Crocodilus" (Massaliasuchus) affuvelensis from the Fuvelian Lignites, 1869. Mandible resembling Musturzabalsuchus illustrated at top.

Musturzabalsuchus was initially assigned to Alligatoroidea on the basis of several characters, including a lateral displacement of the foramen aereum of the articular. Additionally, the enlarged fourth mandibular tooth occludes into a pit in the rostrum. Only the latter feature is present in the more derived alligatorids, and thus it is excluded from the family. The pit that the fourth mandibular occludes into is placed posterior to the last premaxillary tooth, similar to what is seen in "Diplocynodon" hantoniensis, another early alligatoroid. A figure used in an 1869 study by P. Matheron of crocodylian remains from the Fuveau Lignites (illustration) pictured a mandible similar in profile to that of Musturzabalsuchus, but was labeled as belonging to the crocodylian Crocodilus affuvelensis. In 1997 it was suggested that due to this apparent similarity, along with the vagueness of descriptions in the 1869 paper and the loss of the syntype, that C. affuvelensis could be reassigned to Musturzabalsuchus, although it was also acknowledged that the lack of posterior cranial material in the genus made detailed comparisons difficult. A recent 2008 study on Matheron's specimens concluded that they belonged to a new genus distinct from Crocodylus and different from Musturzabalsuchus, named Massaliasuchus.

Recent phylogenetic studies now recover Musturzabalsuchus as a member of Allodaposuchidae, outside Alligatoroidea. However, Musturzabalsuchus is usually omitted from phylogenetic analyses due to the lack of sufficient anatomical information.

== Paleobiogeography ==
Musturzabalsuchus and Acynodon, a contemporary crocodilian also common from Laño, are thought to have been closely related to Paleolaurasian alligatoroids. The latter genus is the only taxon not known from North America to be related to the more derived Late Cretaceous tribodont alligatorids. It is clear that Musturzabalsuchus was endemic to Europe, and was most likely restricted to Ibero-Armorica Island, as the genus is absent from Northern and Eastern European localities from which other alligatoroid fossils have been found.
