= Parietal foramen =

Parietal foramen may refer to:

- Pineal foramen, a midline hole in the skull roof which hosts the parietal eye in many vertebrate species
- Parietal foramina, paired openings in the parietal bones of humans, which host the emissary veins
