= Philippe Matheron =

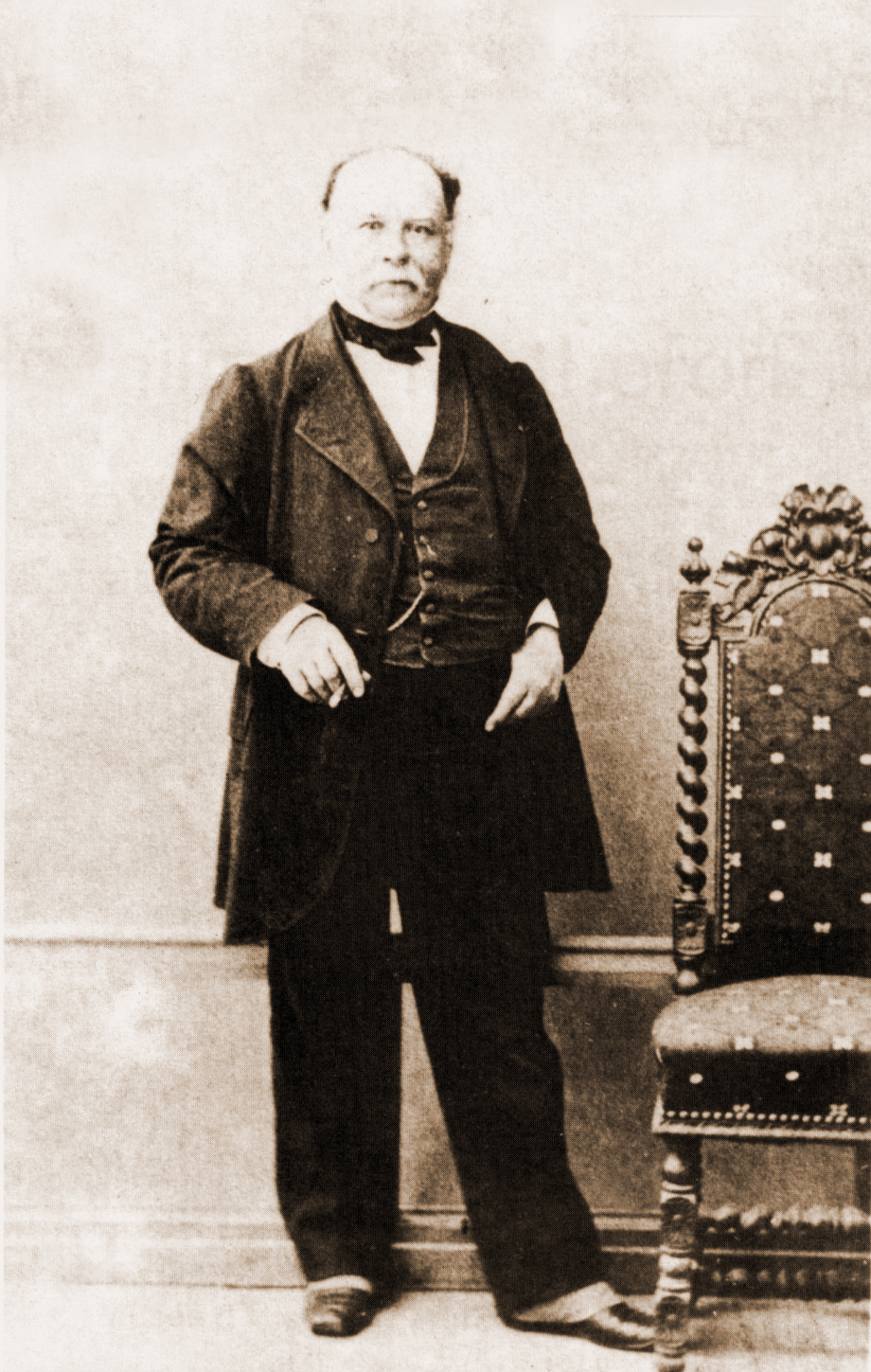
- Philippe Matheron
- Born: 29 October 1807; Marseille
- Died: 31 December 1899 (aged 92); Marseille
- Scientific career
- Fields: palaeontology geology

Philippe Matheron full name Pierre Philippe Émile Matheron (29 October 1807 – 1899) was a French palaeontologist and geologist. He was born on October 29, as the son of Jean Esprit Matheron and Rosalie Françoise Sansan. On June 7, 1896, Matheron was awarded a gold medal by the Academy of Marseille to mark his 60th year as an academic. Matheron named the dinosaurs Hypselosaurus and Rhabdodon, and the crocodilian Crocodylus affuvelensis (now in its own genus, Massaliasuchus) in 1869, in addition to describing the first eggshells that are now considered dinosaurs.
