= Michael Gottlieb Agnethler =

German botanist and numismatist (1719–1752)

- Born: 10 June 1719; Hermannstadt (now Sibiu), Romania
- Died: 15 June 1752 (aged 33); Helmstedt, Germany
- Citizenship: German
- Education: University of Halle
- Scientific career
- Fields: Botany, numismatics
- Workplaces: Akademie der Naturforscher; University of Helmstedt

Michael Gottlieb Agnethler (10 June 1719 – 15 June 1752) was a German botanist and numismatist.

== Early life ==
Michael Agnethler was born to an aristocratic Transylvanian Saxon family of Hermannstadt (now Sibiu, Romania). The Agnethlers had been of a long, prestigious history, with many local socialites in the region. The name of the family originated from the Saxon town of Agnetheln.

Michael Agnethler was the only son of his family. The father was the principal of a gymnasium. Just after Michael's birth, his father was appointed pastor of Gierelsau (Bradu), so the family moved there, where Michael spent his childhood, then returning to Sibiu to attend school.

Michael Agnethler had been of a weak physical constitution, with difficulty sleeping. An anecdote is known, where Agnethler was frightened in his sleep by a fellow student—who jokingly mumbled "swim, you're drowning" into his ears—with Agnethler amidst a nightmare, moving his arms frantically like swimming.

== Career ==
Agnethler started his studies of theology at the University of Halle in 1742; other interests included Ancient Rome antiquities and numismatics. Additionally, his physical frailness led him to start studying medicine.

Agnethler eventually earned a Doctorate of Philosophy in 1750, and of Medicine in 1751. Also in that year, he was given a position at the Akademie der Naturforscher, and soon afterwards became lecturer in Rhetoric, Antiquities, and Poetry at the University of Helmstedt. However, he suffered a severe tuberculosis infection, and died soon thereafter, in 1752.

Michael Gottlieb Agnethler is also known as an entomologist.

== Works ==
He published a number of works on botany (mostly commentaries on Linnaeus) and on numismatics, the latter including descriptions of the coin collections of Johann Heinrich Schulze and Martin Schmeizel.

- Nvmophylacivm Schvlzianvm Digessit, Descripsit Et Perpetvis Insigniorvm Rei Nvmariae Scriptorvm Commentariis Illvstratvm Edidit Michael Gottlieb Agnethler; Pars Prior. Lipsiae Halae Leipzig Halle, Saale 1746
- Laurent. Joann. Nepomucenus Reen ... plagii litterarii in regiae Fridericianae Parnasso graviter accusatus, convictus atque Halensium musarum decreto condemnatus. Hala, 1750
- Beschreibung des Schulzischen Münzkabinet. Halle Gebauer 1750
- Dissertationem solemnem de lauro. Halle 1751
