= Parietal eminence =

Projection in the parietal bone

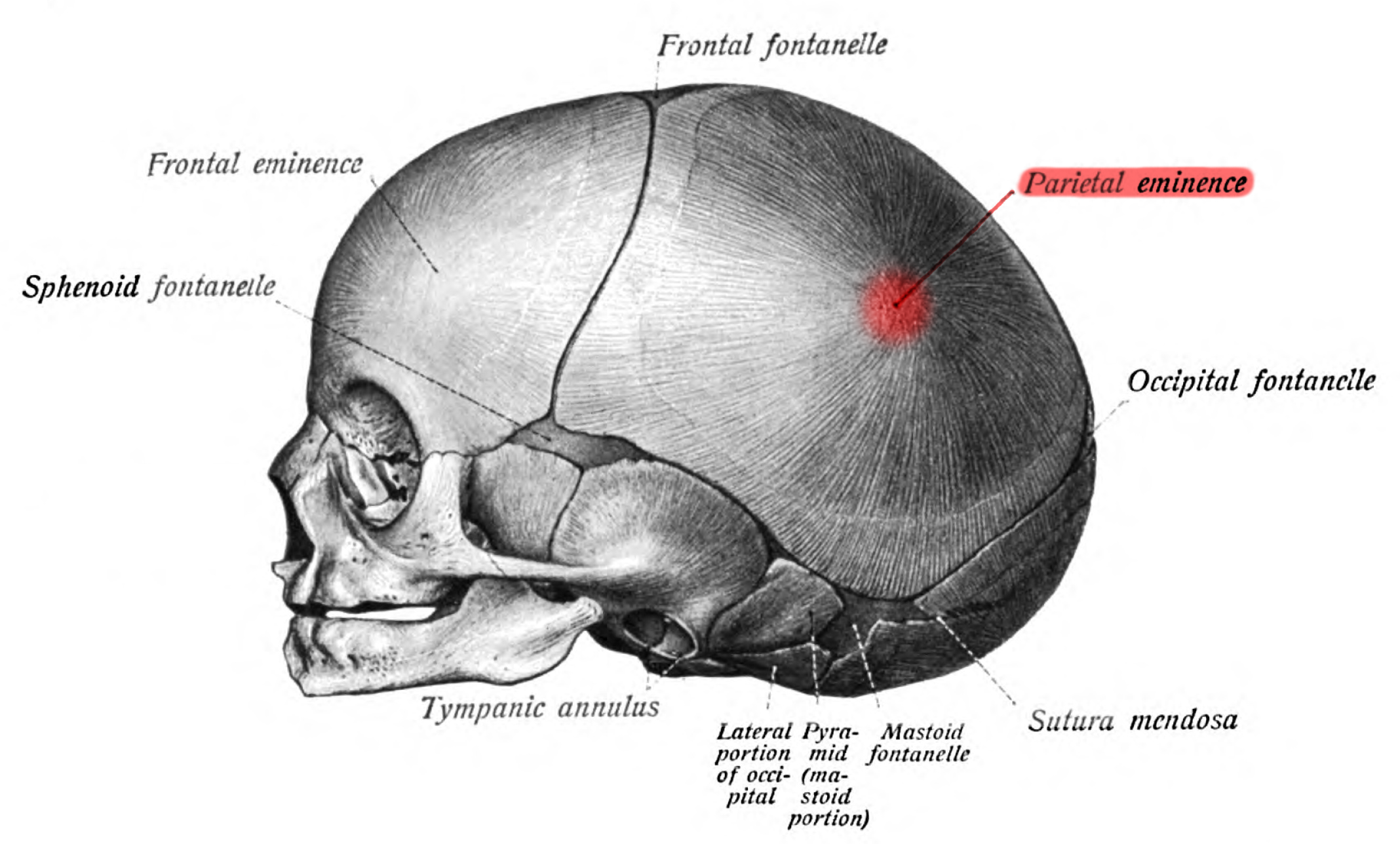
- Skull of a new-born child from the side. (Parietal eminence shown in red.)

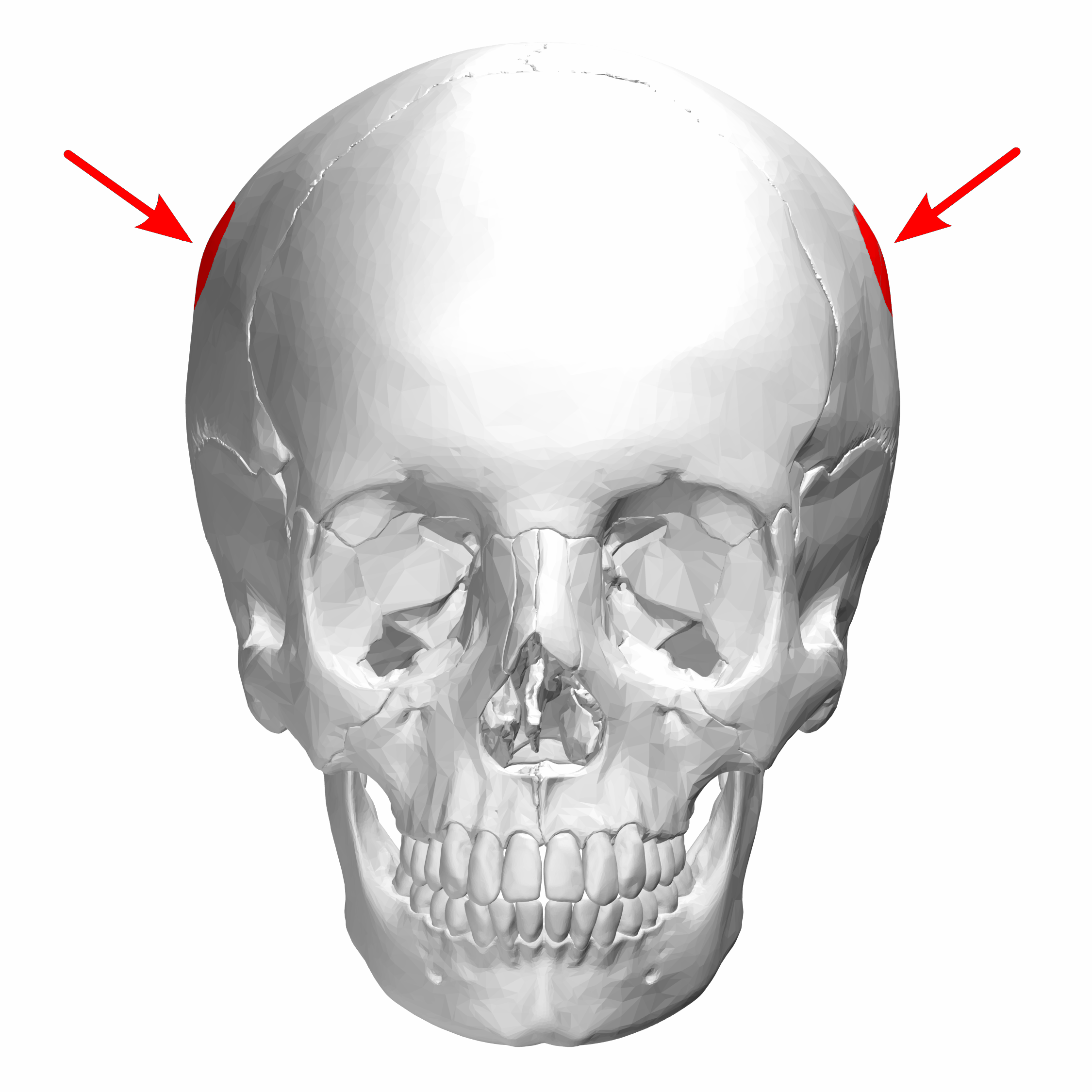
- Front view of the skull. (Parietal eminence pointed by arrows.)

Details
- Precursor: Site of intramembranous ossification of the parietal bone
- Part of: Parietal bone
- System: Skeletal

Identifiers
- Latin: tuber parietale, eminentia parietalis
- TA98: A02.1.02.010
- TA2: 510
- FMA: 57080

The parietal eminence (also parietal boss, parietal tuber, parietal tuberosity or tuber parietale) is a convex, smooth eminence on the external surface of the parietal bone of the skull. It is the site where intramembranous ossification of the parietal bone begins during embryological development. It tends to be slightly more prominent in men than in women, so may be used to help to identify the sex of a skull.

== Additional images ==
Parietal eminence shown in red

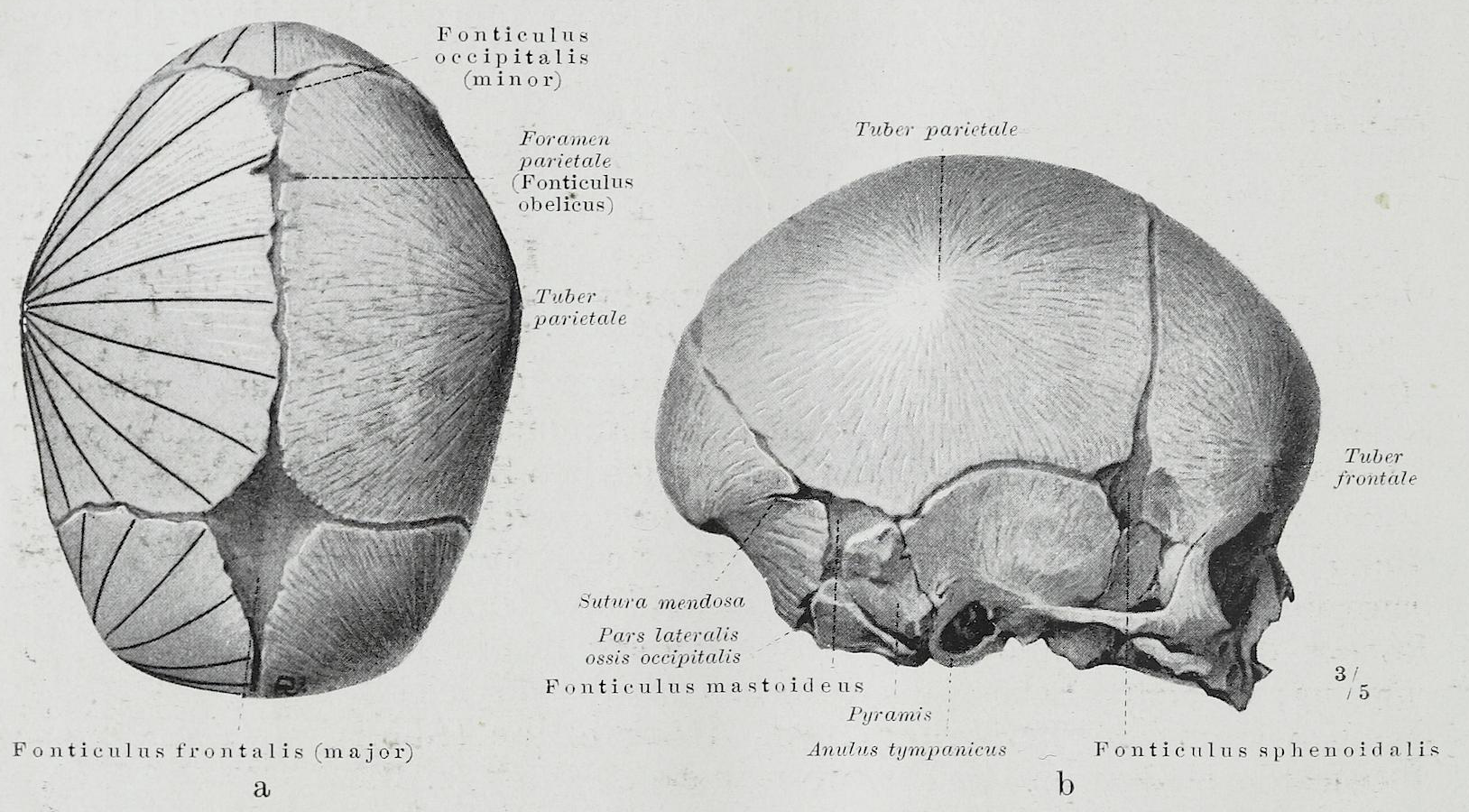
Skull showing parietal eminence as Tuber parietale
