= Linnaean taxonomy =

Rank based classification system for organisms

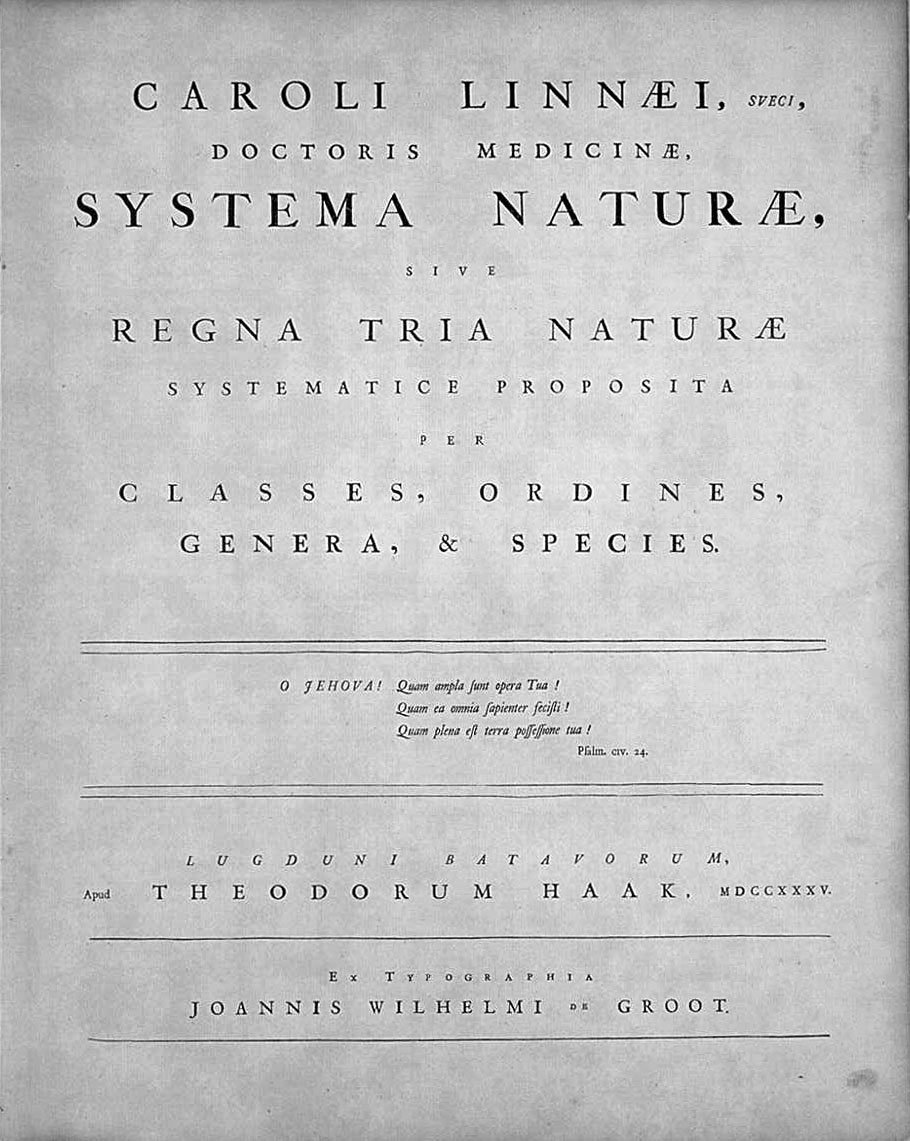
The title page of Systema Naturae, Leiden (1735)

Linnaean taxonomy can mean either of two related concepts:

1. The particular form of biological classification (taxonomy) established by Carl Linnaeus, as set forth in his Systema Naturae (1735) and subsequent works. In his taxonomy Linnaeus described three kingdoms, each divided into classes, and the classes divided into lower ranks in hierarchical order.
2. A general term for ranked classification of organisms. That is, taxonomy in the traditional sense of the word: rank-based scientific classification—which especially is used as opposed to the method of cladistic systematics, which groups organisms into clades.

Ranked classification is attributed to Linnaeus even though he neither invented the concept (which goes back to Plato and Aristotle), nor gave it its present form(s). In fact, ranked classification does not have a defined form, as "Linnaean taxonomy" does not exist as such. Instead it is a collective (abstracting) term for several separate fields used for similar approaches.

Linnaean name also has two meanings, depending on the context: it may either refer to a formal name given by Linnaeus himself, such as Giraffa camelopardalis Linnaeus, 1758; or a formal name in the accepted nomenclature.

== The taxonomy of Linnaeus ==
In his Imperium Naturae, Linnaeus established three kingdoms, namely Regnum Animale, Regnum Vegetabile and Regnum Lapideum. This approach, the Animal, Vegetable and Mineral Kingdoms, survives today in the popular mind, notably in the form of the parlour game question: "Is it animal, vegetable or mineral?", and in Gilbert and Sullivan's "Major-General's Song". The work of Linnaeus had a huge impact on science; it was indispensable as a foundation for biological nomenclature, now regulated by the nomenclature codes. Two of his works, the first edition of the Species Plantarum (1753) for plants and the tenth edition of the Systema Naturae (1758), are accepted as part of the starting points of nomenclature; his binomials (names for species) and generic names take priority over those of others. However, the impact he had on science was not because of the value of his taxonomy.

Linnaeus' kingdoms were in turn divided into classes, and they, in turn, into orders, genera (singular: genus), and species (singular: species), with an additional rank lower than species, though these do not precisely correspond to the use of these terms in modern taxonomy.

=== Classification of plants ===
In Systema Naturae (1735), his classes and orders of plants, according to his Systema Sexuale, were not intended to represent natural groups (as opposed to his ordines naturales in his Philosophia Botanica) but only for use in identification. However, in 1737 he published Genera Plantarum in which he claimed that his classification of genera was a natural system. His botanical classification and sexual system were used well in the nineteenth century. Within each class were several orders. This system is based on the number and arrangement of male (stamens) and female (pistils) organs.

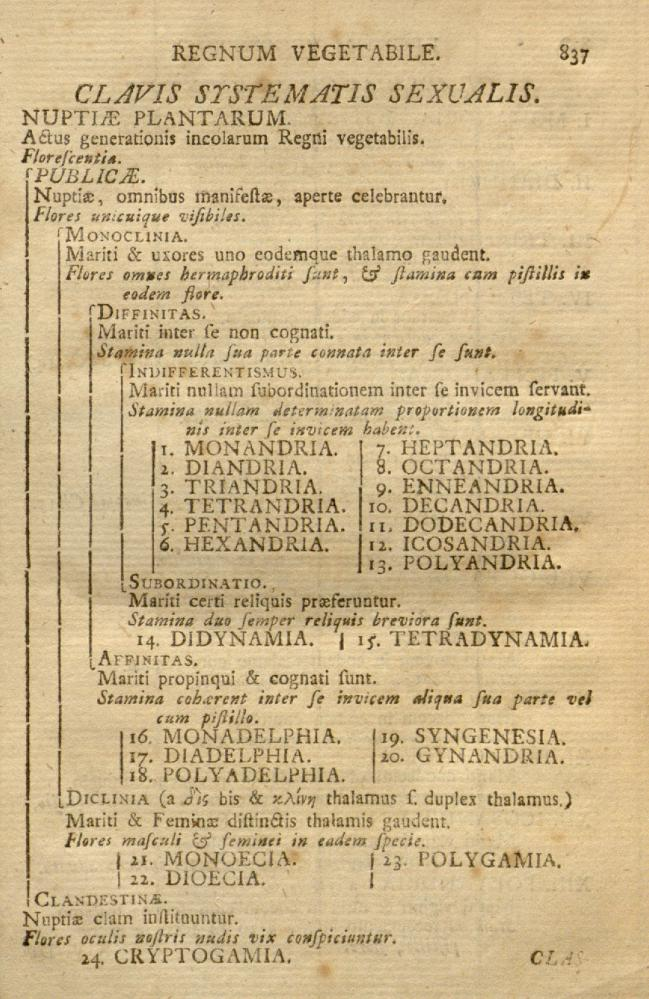
Key to the Sexual System (from the 10th, 1758, edition of the Systema Naturae)

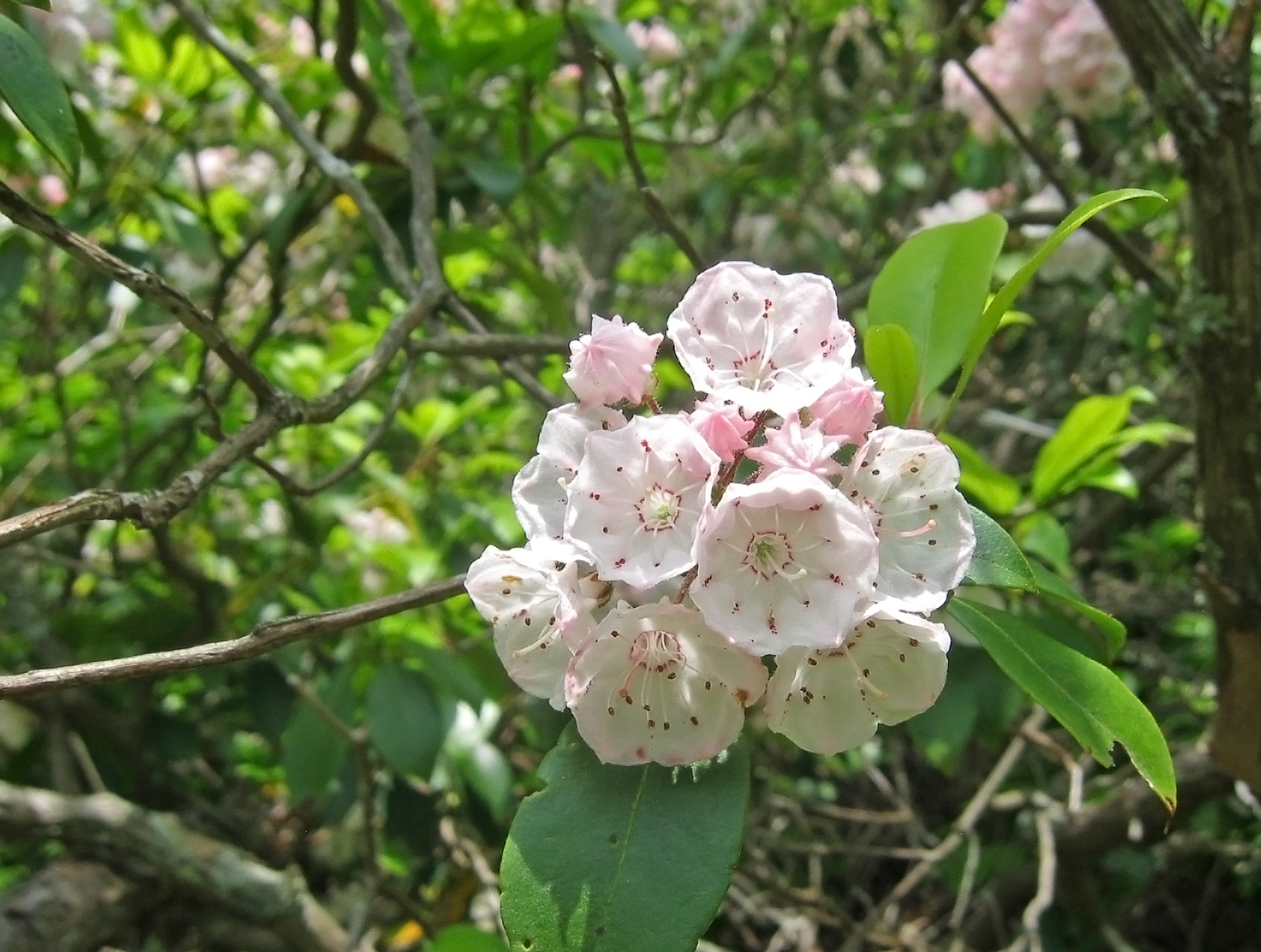
Kalmia is classified according to Linnaeus' sexual system in class Decandria, order Monogyna, because it has 10 stamens and one pistil

The Linnaean classes for plants, in the Sexual System, were (page numbers refer to Species plantarum):

- Classis 1. Monandria: flowers with 1 stamen
- Classis 2. Diandria: flowers with 2 stamens
- Classis 3. Triandria: flowers with 3 stamens
- Classis 4. Tetrandria: flowers with 4 stamens
- Classis 5. Pentandria: flowers with 5 stamens
- Classis 6. Hexandria: flowers with 6 stamens
  - Hexandria monogynia pp. 285–352
  - Hexandria polygynia pp. 342–343
- Classis 7. Heptandria: flowers with 7 stamens
- Classis 8. Octandria: flowers with 8 stamens
- Classis 9. Enneandria: flowers with 9 stamens
- Classis 10. Decandria: flowers with 10 stamens
- Classis 11. Dodecandria: flowers with 11 to 19 stamens
- Classis 12. Icosandria: flowers with 20 (or more) stamens, perigynous
- Classis 13. Polyandria: flowers with many stamens, inserted on the receptacle
- Classis 14. Didynamia: flowers with 4 stamens, 2 long and 2 short
  - Gymnospermia
  - Angiospermia
- Classis 15. Tetradynamia: flowers with 6 stamens, 4 long and 2 short
- Classis 16. Monadelphia; flowers with the anthers separate, but the filaments united, at least at the base
  - Pentandria
  - Decandria
  - Polyandria
- Classis 17. Diadelphia; flowers with the stamens united in two separate groups
  - Hexandria
  - Octandria
  - Decandria
- Classis 18. Polyadelphia; flowers with the stamens united in several separate groups
  - Pentandria
  - Icosandria
  - Polyandria
- Classis 19. Syngenesia; flowers with stamens united by their anthers
  - Polygamia aequalis
  - Polygamia superba
  - Polygamia frustranea
  - Polygamia necessaria
  - Monogamia
- Classis 20. Gynandria; flowers with the stamens united to the pistils
- Classis 21. Monoecia: monoecious plants
- Classis 22. Dioecia: dioecious plants
- Classis 23. Polygamia: polygamodioecious plants
- Classis 24. Cryptogamia: the "flowerless" plants, including ferns, fungi, algae, and bryophytes

The classes based on the number of stamens were then subdivided by the number of pistils, e.g. Hexandria monogynia with six stamens and one pistil. Index to genera p. 1201

By contrast his ordines naturales numbered 69, from Piperitae to Vagae.

=== Classification for animals ===
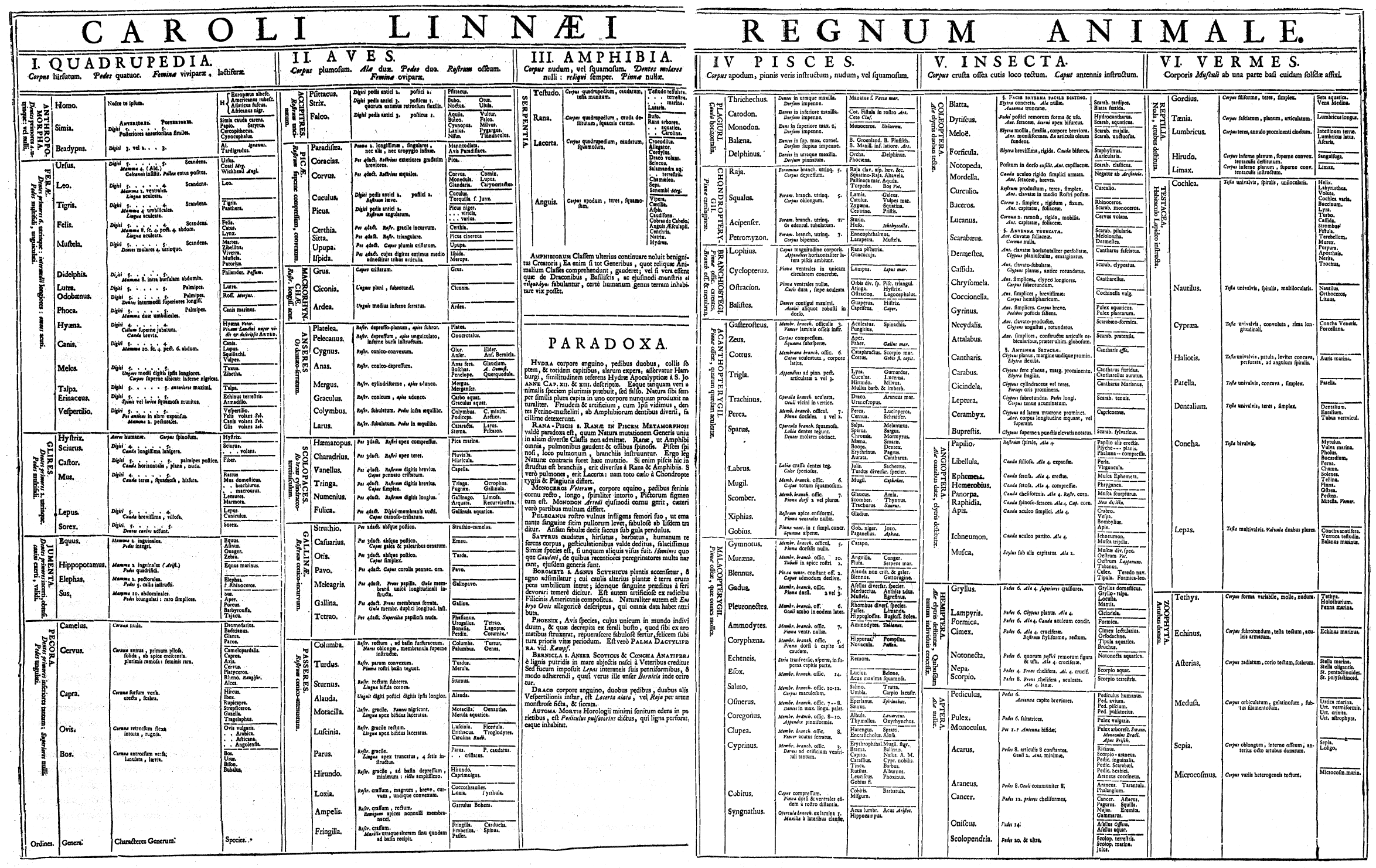
The 1735 classification of animals

Only in the Animal Kingdom is the higher taxonomy of Linnaeus still more or less recognizable and some of these names are still in use, but usually not quite for the same groups. He divided the Animal Kingdom into six classes. In the tenth edition, of 1758, these were:

- Classis 1. Mammalia (mammals)
- Classis 2. Aves (birds)
- Classis 3. Amphibia (amphibians)
- Classis 4. Pisces (fishes)
- Classis 5. Insecta (arthropods)
- Classis 6. Vermes (worms)

=== Classification for minerals ===
His taxonomy of minerals has long since been dropped from use. In the tenth edition, 1758, of the Systema Naturae, the Linnaean classes were:

- Classis 1. Petræ
- Classis 2. Mineræ
- Classis 3. Fossilia
- Classis 4. Vitamentra

== Rank-based scientific classification ==
This rank-based method of classifying living organisms was originally popularized by (and much later named for) Linnaeus, although it has changed considerably since his time. The greatest innovation of Linnaeus, and still the most important aspect of this system, is the general use of binomial nomenclature, the combination of a genus name and a second term, which together uniquely identify each species of organism within a kingdom. For example, the human species is uniquely identified within the animal kingdom by the name Homo sapiens. No other species of animal can have this same binomen (the technical term for a binomial in the case of animals). Prior to Linnaean taxonomy, animals were classified according to their mode of movement.

Linnaeus's use of binomial nomenclature was anticipated by the theory of definition used in Scholasticism. Scholastic logicians and philosophers of nature defined the species human, for example, as Animal rationalis, where animal was considered a genus and rationalis (Latin for 'rational') the characteristic distinguishing humans from all other animals. Treating animal as the immediate genus of the species human, horse, etc. is of little practical use to the biological taxonomist, however. Accordingly, Linnaeus's classification treats animal as a class including many genera (subordinated to the animal kingdom via intermediary classes such as orders), and treats Homo as the genus of a species Homo sapiens, with sapiens (Latin for 'knowing' or 'understanding') playing a differentiating role analogous to that played, in the Scholastic system, by rationalis (the word homo, Latin for "human being", was used by the Scholastics to denote a species, not a genus).

A strength of Linnaean taxonomy is that it can be used to organize the different kinds of living organisms, simply and practically. Every species can be given a unique (and ideally stable) name, as compared with common names that are often neither unique nor consistent from place to place and language to language. This uniqueness and stability are, of course, a result of the acceptance by working systematists (biologists specializing in taxonomy and evolution), not merely of the binomial names themselves, but of the rules governing the use of these names, which are laid down in formal nomenclature codes.

Species can be placed in a ranked hierarchy, starting with either domains or kingdoms. Domains are divided into kingdoms. Kingdoms are divided into phyla (singular: phylum) — for animals; the term division, used for plants and fungi, is equivalent to the rank of phylum (and the International Code of Botanical Nomenclature allows the use of either term). Phyla (or divisions) are divided into classes, and they, in turn, into orders, families, genera (singular: genus), and species (singular: species). There are ranks below species: in zoology, subspecies (but see form or morph); in botany, subspecies, variety (Latin: varietas), and form (Latin: forma).

Groups of organisms at any of these ranks are called taxa (singular: taxon) or taxonomic groups.

The Linnaean system has proven robust. However, although the number of ranks is unlimited, in practice any classification becomes more cumbersome the more ranks are added. Among the later subdivisions that have arisen are such entities as phyla, families, and tribes, as well as any number of ranks with prefixes (superfamilies, subfamilies, etc.). The use of newer taxonomic tools such as cladistics and phylogenetic nomenclature has led to a different way of looking at evolution (expressed in many nested clades) and this sometimes leads to a desire for more ranks. An example of such complexity is the scheme for mammals proposed by McKenna and Bell.

=== Alternatives ===
Over time, understanding of the relationships between living things has changed. Linnaeus could only base his scheme on the structural similarities of the different organisms. The greatest change was the widespread acceptance of evolution as the mechanism of biological diversity and species formation, following the 1859 publication of Charles Darwin's On the Origin of Species. It then became generally understood that classifications ought to reflect the phylogeny of organisms, their descent by evolution. This led to evolutionary taxonomy, where the various extant and extinct are linked together to construct a phylogeny. This is largely what is meant by the term Linnaean taxonomy when used in a modern context. In cladistics, originating in the work of Willi Hennig, 1950 onwards, each taxon is grouped so as to include the common ancestor of the group's members. Such taxa may be either monophyletic (including all descendants) such as genus Homo, or paraphyletic (excluding some descendants), such as genus Australopithecus.

Originally, Linnaeus established three kingdoms in his scheme, namely for Plants, Animals and an additional group for minerals, which has long since been abandoned. Since then, various life forms have been moved into three new kingdoms: Monera, for prokaryotes (i.e., bacteria); Protista, for protozoans and most algae; and Fungi. This five-kingdom scheme is still far from the phylogenetic ideal and has largely been supplanted in modern taxonomic work by a division into three domains: Bacteria and Archaea, which contain the prokaryotes, and Eukaryota, comprising the remaining forms. These arrangements should not be seen as definitive. They are based on the genomes of the organisms; as knowledge on this increases, classifications will change.

Representing presumptive evolutionary relationships within the framework of Linnaean taxonomy is sometimes seen as problematic, especially given the wide acceptance of cladistic methodology and numerous molecular phylogenies that have challenged long-accepted classifications. Therefore, some systematists have proposed a PhyloCode to replace it.

== See also ==
- History of plant systematics
- Linnaean Herbarium
- Phylogenetic tree – a way to express insights into evolutionary relationships
- Zoology mnemonic for a list of mnemonic sentences used to help people remember the list of Linnaean ranks.
- Linnean hot taxa
- Linnean hotspots

== Bibliography ==
Books

- Fara, Patricia (2003). Sex, Botany and Empire: The Story of Carl Linnaeus and Joseph Banks. Cambridge: Icon Books. ISBN 9781840464443.
- Frängsmyr, Tore, ed. (1994) [1983, University of California Press]. Linnaeus: The Man and His Work (revised ed.). Canton, MA, USA: Science History Publications/USA. ISBN 978-0-88135-154-5. OCLC 30154266.(Original edition available here at Internet Archive)
- Linnaeus, C. (1753). Species Plantarum. Stockholm: Laurentii Salvii.
- Polaszek, Andrew (2010). Systema Naturae 250 - The Linnaean Ark. Boca Raton, FL: CRC Press. ISBN 978-1-4200-9502-9. OCLC 237886102.
- Dawkins, Richard. 2004. The Ancestor's Tale: A Pilgrimage to the Dawn of Life. Boston: Houghton Mifflin. ISBN 0-618-00583-8
- Ereshefsky, Marc. 2000. The Poverty of the Linnaean Hierarchy: A Philosophical Study of Biological Taxonomy. Cambridge: Cambridge University Press.
- Gould, Stephen Jay. 1989. Wonderful Life: The Burgess Shale and the Nature of History. W. W. Norton & Co. ISBN 0-393-02705-8
- Pavord, Anna. The Naming of Names: The Search for Order in the World of Plants. Bloomsbury. ISBN 0-7475-7952-0

Articles

- Bremer, Birgitta (April 2007). "Linnaeus' sexual system and flowering plant phylogeny". Nordic Journal of Botany. 25 (1–2): 5–6. doi:10.1111/j.0107-055X.2007.00098_12.x.
- George, Sam (June 2005). "'Not Strictly Proper For A Female Pen': Eighteenth-Century Poetry and the Sexuality of Botany". Comparative Critical Studies. 2 (2): 191–210. doi:10.3366/ccs.2005.2.2.191.

Websites

- Bihrmann (2021). "Taxonomy, Carl Linnaeus' system 1753". Birhmann's Caudiciforms.
