= Sanford Palay =

Sanford Louis "Sandy" Palay (23 September 1918 in Cleveland, Ohio, United States – 5 August 2002 in Concord, Massachusetts, United States) was an American scientist and educator.

== Academic Background ==
Palay received his bachelor's degree from Oberlin College. Upon graduation in 1940, he entered the School of Medicine at Case Western Reserve University to study bacteriology. He changed his mind, and decided to study medicine, later specializing in neuroscience. He applied for a summer fellowship during his first year of medical school and was accepted into the laboratory of Ernst and Berta Scharrer, where Palay carried out his first investigations. Palay's professional and personal association with the Scharrers continued throughout his career.

After completing his M.D. degree in 1943, Palay spent a year as an intern at New Haven Hospital, while in the evenings continuing his research into neurosecretion at the Department of Anatomy at Yale University. At the end of his internship, he returned to Case Western Reserve, with appointments as a research and teaching fellow.

== World War II ==
Ernst Scharrer suggested that Palay consider going to the Rockefeller Institute to work with Albert Claude, an early researcher into cell biology. However Palay was called up to serve with the Army Medical Corps in occupied Japan. This interrupted his scientific career, but he began a lifelong interest in Japanese art and culture.

== Scientific Research ==
On his return from the forces, Palay took Ernst Scharrer's advice and went to the Rockefeller Institute to work with Albert Claude. They spent a year examining salivary gland chromosomes by electron microscopy, using formvar replicas. This was one of the few means available at that time for examining biological specimens by electron microscopy.

== National Institutes of Health ==
Eventually Palay returned to Yale, where he was appointed first as an Instructor and then as an assistant professor of Anatomy, where he remained until his appointment as Chief of Neurocytology at the National Institutes of Health (NIH) in Bethesda, Maryland. Later, he was promoted to the position of Chief of the Laboratory of Neuroanatomical Science, and while he was at the NIH, he continued his work on the ultrastructure of synapses, as well as studying neurosecretion and neuroglia.

== Harvard Medical School ==
In 1961, Palay accepted an invitation to become the Bullard Professor of Neuroanatomy at Harvard Medical School. A dominant figure in the field of the fine structure of the nervous system, Palay and his colleagues improved the quality of preservation of central nervous tissue by the introduction of a method to fix central nervous tissue by perfusion with osmic acid.

He and his wife Victoria Chan-Palay carried out detailed analyses of the cerebellum, and this work culminated in the publication of their book Cerebellar Cortex: Cytology and Organization (published in 1974). In 1970, he co-authored The Fine Structure of the Nervous System (with Alan Peters and Harry Webster) to serve as a guide in the analysis of electron micrographs of the nervous system; three editions have been published, the last one in 1991.

He served as the 57th president of the American Association of Anatomists from 1980 to 1981.

== Boston College ==
After his retirement from Harvard, Palay accepted a position as Distinguished Scholar-in-Residence in the Department of Biology at Boston College. Even when his health began to decline, Palay taught until the spring of 2002; his students visiting his home for their seminars. He also served on several graduate student thesis committees during this period, and shared his expertise in neurocytology with the Biology Faculty at Boston College.

In 1980, he agreed to become the Editor-in-Chief of the Journal of Comparative Neurology, which he edited for fourteen years; even after his retirement from Harvard in 1989, he continued as Editor-in-Chief, doing his work in the basement of his home in Concord.

He also served on the editorial boards of scientific publications as the Journal of Neurocytology, the Journal of Cell Biology, Neuroscience, Brain Research, Experimental Brain Research, Experimental Neurology and Ultrastructural Research.

== Awards ==
- In 1982 he was awarded the Ralph W. Gerard Prize in Neuroscience.

== Sources ==
- http://www.aps-pub.com/proceedings/1484/480412.pdf
