= Edmund S. Crelin Jr. =

American anatomist

Edmund S. Crelin, Jr.

Edmund Slocum Crelin, Jr. Ph.D. D.Sc. (1923–2004) was professor of anatomy at Yale University from 1968 to 1991.

He was born in Red Bank, New Jersey, on April 26, 1923, oldest son of Agatha Bublin Crelin and Edmund S. Crelin, Sr. He was valedictorian of the 1942 senior class at Red Bank High School. After brief service in the United States Navy SeaBees during World War II, he enrolled at Central College in Pella, Iowa, where he received his B.A. cum laude in 1947, majoring in biology. He enrolled at Yale University and earned his Ph.D. from Yale University School of Medicine in 1951.

== Career ==
Upon graduation from Yale, Crelin joined the School of Medicine faculty, became a full professor of Anatomy in 1968, served as department chairman from 1974 to 1984 and was awarded the honor of professor emeritus upon his retirement in 1991. Crelin was a member of the American Association of Anatomists, Sigma Xi, AAAS and AMA, served as associate editor of the Anatomical Record from 1968 to 1974 and was an editor for Gray's Anatomy

Crelin helped establish the Physician Associates program at the Yale University School of Medicine. As chairman of the Human Growth and Development Study Unit, he was instrumental in the genesis of Yale’s neonatal and ultrasound units. Crelin was a consultant to the Newborn Special Care unit of the Yale-New Haven Hospital.

Crelin was a leading research scientist; his 159 published articles in medical and scientific journals cover cell cancer and bone research, development and physiology of connective tissues, human development and anthropological evolution of the human foot and the vocal tract.

He was the author of three books. His self-illustrated Anatomy of the Newborn, which took 6 years to complete, was the first atlas of human infant anatomy in medical history. Its accompanying text, Functional Anatomy of the Newborn, was published in 1973. Published in many languages, they are still considered premier references in the field. His third book, The Human Vocal Tract (Anatomy, Function, Development and Evolution) was published in 1987.

Crelin died on June 21, 2004. He was married for 56 years, father of four and grandfather of 12 children

== Honors ==
- Outstanding Teacher of the Year in 1961
- Outstanding Research from the American Academy of Orthopaedic Surgeons in 1976
- Yale Physician’s Associate Program Award for most outstanding teacher in 1973 and 1980
- Honorary Doctor of Science Degree from Central College in 1969
- Honorary appointment to the Yale Society of Distinguished Teachers, upon retirement after 40 years at Yale
