= Bensley =

Bensley may refer to:

== Surname ==
- Benjamin Arthur Bensley (1875–1934), Canadian mammalogist specialising in marsupials
- Bill Bensley (1959), American architect
- Harry Bensley, English man who attempted to walk around the world
- Peter Bensley, Australian actor
- Robert Bensley (c. 1740–1817), English actor
- Robert Russell Bensley (1867–1956), Canadian physiologist and medical researcher
- Sir William Bensley, 1st Baronet, director of the East India Company

== Location ==
- Bensley, Virginia
