= Harold Cummins =

American anatomist and dermatoglyphics specialist

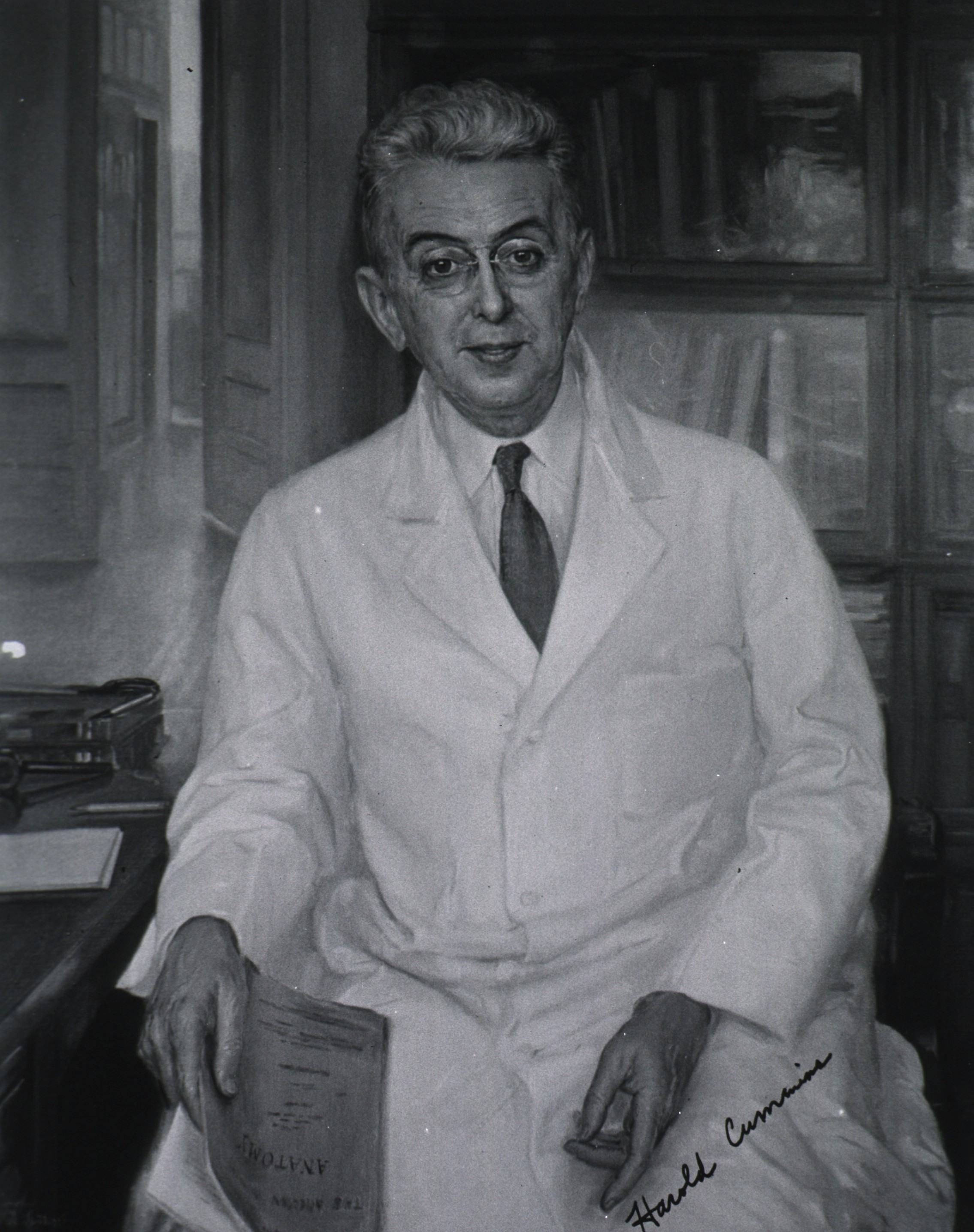
- Born: May 28, 1893; Markleville, Indiana
- Died: May 12, 1976 (aged 82); New Orleans, Louisiana
- Education: University of Michigan; Tulane University
- Known for: Dermatoglyphics; anatomy
- Spouse: Elizabeth Van Buskirk
- Children: 3

Harold Cummins (May 28, 1893 – May 12, 1976) was an anatomist and dermatoglyphics specialist. He is considered to be the founder of dermatoglyphics.

== Early life and education ==
A native of Markleville, Indiana, Cummins attended the University of Michigan, receiving his BA in 1916. While attending the University of Michigan, he was inducted into two academic honor societies: Sigma Xi and Phi Beta Kappa. Cummins completed his PhD in anatomy at Tulane University in 1925.

== Career ==
In his multiple positions as an educator, Cummins taught over 5000 students. Cummins worked at Vanderbilt University as a Histology instructor (1916-1917) and as an assistant professor of Microscopic Anatomy from 1917 through 1919. In 1919, Cummins joined the faculty at Tulane University where he remained for the rest of his educational career, nearly five decades, serving in a variety of positions. His positions at Tulane University included:

- Chairman of the Department of Anatomy (1933–1960)
- Chairman of the Department of Microscopic Anatomy (1933–1945)
- Assistant dean at Tulane University School of Medicine (1949-1964)
- Chair of Tulane University School of Medicine admissions (1949-1964)
- Professor emeritus of Anatomy (1964)

Cummins also held positions at a number of journals and associated organizations including:

- American Journal of Human Genetics editorial board (Advisory editorial committee) (1949-1955)
- Vice President of the American Society of Human Genetics (1955)
- 38th President of the American Association of Anatomists (1961-1962)

In 1926, Cummins coined the term dermatoglyphics.

== Professional affiliations ==
- American Association of Physical Anthropologists
- International Association for Identification
- Society for Experimental Biology and Medicine
- American Association for the Advancement of Science
- Louisiana State Medical Society (honorary member)

== Selected publications ==
- Cummins, Harold (August 1923). "The configurations of epidermal ridges in a human Acephalic monster". The Anatomical Record. 26 (1): 1–13. doi:10.1002/ar.1090260102. S2CID 84253902.
- Cummins, Harold; Keith, Harriet H.; Midlo, Charles; Montgomery, Robert B.; Wilder, Harris H.; Wilder, Inez Whipple (January 1929). "Revised methods of interpreting and formulating palmar dermatoglyphics". American Journal of Physical Anthropology. 12 (3): 415–473. doi:10.1002/ajpa.1330120303.
- Cummins, Harold (October 1934). "A significant example of pedunculated postminimus". The Anatomical Record. 60 (3): 273–277. doi:10.1002/ar.1090600304. S2CID 85675360.
- Cummins, Harold (April 1935). "Dermatoglyphics in Eskimos from Point Barrow". American Journal of Physical Anthropology. 20 (1): 13–17. doi:10.1002/ajpa.1330200105.
- Cummins, Harold (March 1940). "Finger prints correlated with handedness". American Journal of Physical Anthropology. 26 (1): 151–166. doi:10.1002/ajpa.1330260126.
- Cummins, Harold; Midlo, Charles (1976). Finger Prints, Palms, and Soles: an Introduction to Dermatoglyphics. South Berlin, Mass.: Research Pub. Co. ISBN 0486207781.
- Cummins, Harold (December 1955). "Dermatoglyphics of Bushmen (South Africa)". American Journal of Physical Anthropology. 13 (4): 699–709. doi:10.1002/ajpa.1330130411. PMID 13292533.

== See also ==
- Category:Taxa named by Harold Cummins
