= Anusuya Chinsamy-Turan =

South African scientist

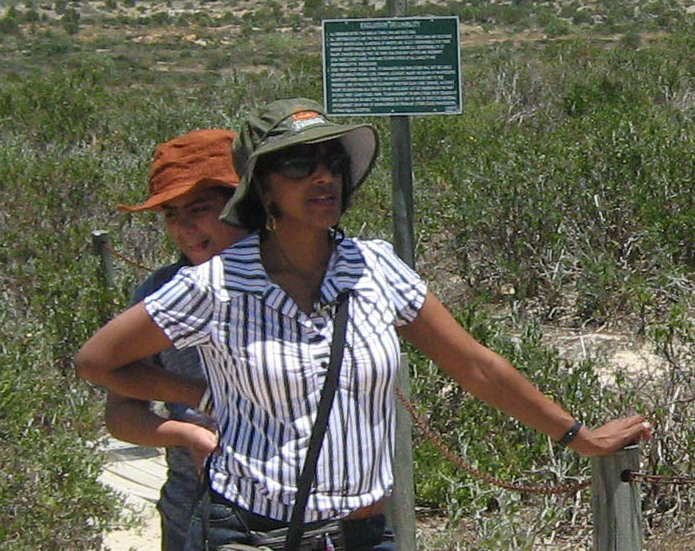
- West Coast Fossil Park Tour, 2009
- Born: Anusuya Chinsamy; 27 August 1962 (age 64)
- Education: University of Witwatersrand; University of Durban-Westville
- Scientific career
- Fields: paleontology
- Workplaces: University of Cape Town
- Thesis: The osteohistology of femoral growth within a clade: a comparison of the Crocodile Crocodylus, the dinosaurs Massospondylus and Syntarsus, and the birds Struthio and Sagittarius (1991)

Anusuya Chinsamy-Turan (born August 27, 1962) is a South African vertebrate paleontologist known for her expertise and developments in the study of the microstructure of fossil teeth and bones of extinct and extant vertebrates. She was the head of the Department of Biological Sciences (originally the Department of Zoology), at the University of Cape Town from 2012 to 2015 .

== Education and career ==
Chinsamy-Turan received a B.Sc. from the University of Witwatersrand in 1983 and a B.Sc. Honours in 1984, a U.H.D.E. (University Higher Diploma in Education) from the University of Durban-Westville (now called University of Kwazulu-Natal) in 1985, and a Ph.D. (1991) from Witwatersrand. She then proceeded to do a postdoctorate at the University of Pennsylvania (1992–1994).

She is the author of six books; two academic works, The Microstructure of Dinosaur Bone - Deciphering Biology Through Fine Scale Techniques, published in 2005, by the Johns Hopkins University Press and Forerunners of Mammals -Radiation. Biology published by the Indiana University Press in 2012; a children's book, Famous dinosaurs of Africa, published in 2008, and a popular level book, Fossils For Africa, published in 2014 by Cambridge University Press. Her two most recent books (2021) are for children and are entitled "Dinosaurs and other Prehistoric life" and " African Dinosaurs".

== Awards ==
Chinsamy-Turan won "Distinguished Women Scientist Award" from the South African Department of Science and Technology in 2002, and won the "South African Woman of the Year Award" in 2005. The National Research Foundation of South Africa awarded her its "President's Award" in 1995 and the "Transformation Award" in 2012.

In 2013, she won The World Academy of Sciences (TWAS) Sub-Saharan Prize for the Public Understanding and Popularization of Science.

The sabre-tooth cat species Lokotunjailurus chinsamyae is named after her.

== Selected publications ==
- Chinsamy, A, Buffetaut, E, Angst, D., Canoville, A. 2014. Insight into the growth dynamics and systematic affinities of the Late Cretaceous Gargantuavis from bone microstructure. Naturwissenschaften 101:447-452
- Chinsamy, A., Chiappe, L., Marugán-Lobón, J., Chunling, G. and Fengjiao, Z. 2013. Gender Identification of the Mesozoic bird Confuciusornis sanctus. Nature Communications.
- Chinsamy, A. Thomas, D. B., Tumarkin-Deratzian, A. & A. Fiorillo. 2012. Hadrosaurs were perennial polar residents. Anatomical Record, 295 (4): 551–714.
- Jasinoski, S.C. and A. Chinsamy. 2012. Mandibular histology and growth of the non-mammaliaform cynodont Tritylodon. Journal of Anatomy, 220 (6): 564–579.
- Cerda, I. A. & Chinsamy. 2012. Biological Implications of the bone microstructure of the Late Cretaceous ornithopod dinosaur Gasparinisaura cincosaltensis. Journal of Vertebrate Paleontology. 32(2):355-368.
- Chinsamy, A., Codorniu, L. and L. Chiappe. 2009 The Bone Microstructure of Pterodaustro guinazui. Anatomical Record 292: 1462–1477.
- Chinsamy, A., and Tumarkin-Deratzian, A. 2009. Pathological bone tissue in a turkey vulture and a nonavian dinosaur. Anatomical Record 292: 1478-1484
