= Franklin P. Mall =

American anatomist and pathologist (1862-1917)

Franklin Paine Mall
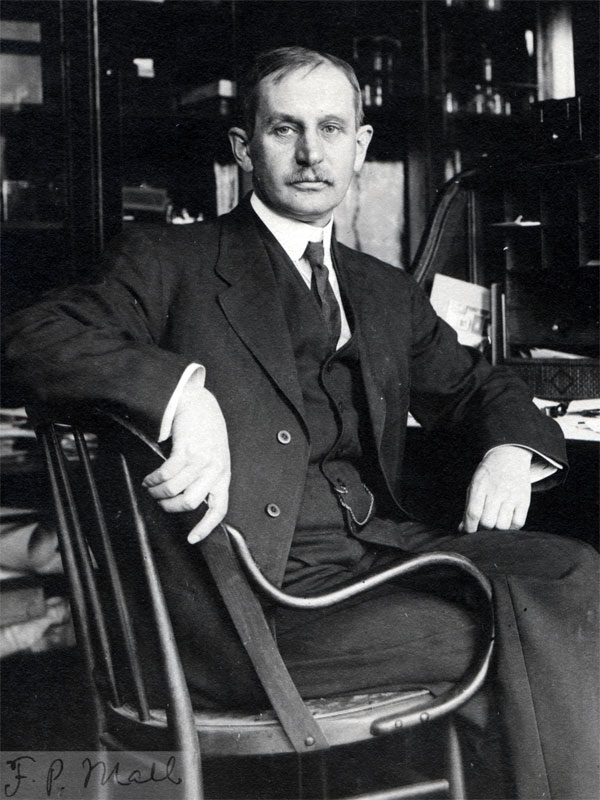
- Born: September 28, 1862; Belle Plaine, Iowa
- Died: November 17, 1917 (age 55); Baltimore, Maryland
- Education: University of Michigan, MD
- Scientific career
- Fields: Anatomy, Embryology
- Workplaces: Clark University, University of Chicago, Johns Hopkins School of Medicine, Carnegie Institution of Washington

Franklin Paine Mall (September 28, 1862 – November 17, 1917) was an American anatomist and pathologist known for his research and literature in the fields of anatomy and embryology. Mall was granted a fellowship for the Department of Pathology at the Johns Hopkins University and after positions at other universities, later returned to be the head of the first Anatomy Department at the Johns Hopkins School of Medicine. There, he reformed the field of anatomy and its educational curriculum. Mall was the founder and the first chief of the Department of Embryology at the Carnegie Institution for Science. He later donated his collection of human embryos that he started as a postgraduate student to the Carnegie Institution for Science. He was an elected member of the American Academy of Arts and Sciences, the American Philosophical Society, and the United States National Academy of Sciences.

== Biography ==
=== Early life ===
Franklin Mall was born to German immigrants Franz Mall and Louise Christine Miller, on a farm in Belle Plaine, Iowa. At the age of ten, Mall's mother died, and his stepmother showed no affection towards him. Mall was unhappy in his childhood, and he had little opportunity to challenge his intellect both at home and in school. Mall later met John McCarthy, a teacher at the local academy who greatly impacted Mall's learning experience and life. Mall, in a personal correspondence, wrote that while he hated history as a child, Mr. McCarthy "showed [him] he liked it." In addition, Mall had the support of his father who recognized the importance of education. With this newfound appreciation of academic pursuit, Mall was able to attain higher education.

=== Education ===
Mall was accepted into the Department of Medicine at the University of Michigan, the school where his family physician had received his training. During his time at Ann Arbor, Mall was drawn to three of his professors: Corydon Ford, Victor Vaughn, and Henry Sewall. Mall was impressed by their pedagogical approach and their extensive knowledge in their respective fields. Their lectures were factual and objective; in addition, laboratory experiments were assigned to reinforce the knowledge that students had gained from lecture. Mall also noted that the majority of the students in his class favored rote memorization as a means to academic success. This was in contrast to his own preference for critical thinking and reasoning, a difference that emerged in his subsequent educational reforms.

Mall graduated in June 1883 and went to Germany to further his education in 1884. He spent his first year abroad in Heidelberg to study ophthalmology. In Germany, Mall found his peers to be especially driven and better educated; they were independently planning their future studies. Mall heavily valued the freedom of choice and the liberty afforded to him while studying in Germany. In 1885, Mall went to Leipzig to begin his career in research under the guidance of Wilhelm His. Mall's first project resulted in evidence that contradicted his mentor's position on the origin of the thymus, concluding that it develops from the endoderm instead of the ectoderm. His later revisited the issue and acknowledged the validity of Mall's work. During his time with His, Mall also started a collection of human embryos that he would continue to expand for the rest of his career.

With His' recommendation, Mall moved to Carl Ludwig's laboratory later that year, where he was assigned to study the blood vessels and lymphatics of the intestinal villus. Under Ludwig's tutelage, Mall learned methods of injecting blood vessels and lymphatics. Mall took apart the layers of the intestine to examine the blood supply of each layer and the organ as a whole. Using this knowledge, he constructed a model that demonstrated the circulatory relationship in the intestinal organ; he simplified the pattern of blood vessels into a five-ordered model that could be generalized to circulation in all organs. Mall's strong relationships with his mentors grew his curiosity and his affinity to scientific research. He later spread his focus on laboratory research to the American education system.

=== Personal life ===
As described by a student, Mall was modest and shy on outward appearance. He was cheerful and known to have a good sense of humor among his friends. Mall was deeply immersed in his research, heavily focused on solving any complications that were presented during the course of his work. Often deep in thought, Mall would sometimes be seen wandering around the hospital building and the city of Baltimore. Otherwise, he was known to be engrossed with work for long periods in his laboratory.

Mall first met Mabel Glover while teaching his first class at Johns Hopkins. They got married in 1894 and had two daughters, Margaret and Mary Louise Mall.

Mall fell ill after complications from a second operation for the removal of gallstones. He died while being treated at the Johns Hopkins Hospital in November 1917.

== Career ==
=== Early career ===
In 1886, Mall returned to the United States to undertake a fellowship in pathology at the Johns Hopkins University. Training under William H. Welch, Mall studied the anatomy of the intestine and stomach. He also expressed interest in bacteriology and connective tissue, discovering the ability of certain bacteria to digest connective tissue. Mall's collaboration with William Halstead on connective tissue led to the development of a new method of surgical suturing for the intestine. In 1888, Mall became a professor of pathology. After a three-year stay in Baltimore, Mall accepted an offer from Stanley Hall for the position of adjunct professor of anatomy at Clark University. While at Clark, Mall used the Born wax-plate method to create the first model of a human embryo in the United States. Furthermore, Mall discovered the vasomotor nerves of the portal vein and founded an embryological research program at the university. In 1892, Mall followed Charles Otis Whitman to Chicago, becoming the professor of anatomy at the University of Chicago. After a year in Chicago, Mall accepted a professorship at the then newly opened Johns Hopkins School of Medicine.

=== Return to Johns Hopkins University ===
Accepting a personal request from William H. Welch, Mall returned to Baltimore in 1893 and set up the Department of Anatomy at the Johns Hopkins School of Medicine. Mall became the first professor of anatomy, continuing his research on organ structure and embryology. Mall was also given the freedom to run the department and teach according to his ideals of medical education; his focus on explorative learning led him to set up a dissection teaching laboratory that was conveniently located close to the neighborhood abattoir.

During his tenure, Mall advanced the methods and conditions employed to preserve biological material. Prior to Mall's exploits, medical schools would only conduct dissections in cold weather to stymie the decomposition of cadavers. Through experimentation on dog cadavers, Mall developed a method of embalming and cold storage that enhanced the preservation of human cadavers and other biological samples. This method subsequently spread to other medical schools and rendered previous practices obsolete.

He served as the seventh president of the Association of American Anatomists from 1905 to 1908.

=== Educational reforms ===
As chair of the Department of Anatomy, Mall criticized the existing anatomy curriculum at Johns Hopkins and was especially particular about the lack of practical work such as dissection. Mall introduced a revised curriculum that rarely involved lecture; instead, he believed that self-directed learning, facilitated by practical experience, was optimal. Mall emphasized a strong grounding in human anatomy that would be instrumental in solving pressing anatomical issues.

Mall's students would study using primarily the cadavers, textbooks, and models provided. In addition, instructors (himself included) were always present to assist the students during their practical work. His training produced several accomplished biologists, such as Florence R. Sabin and George L. Streeter. However, one of Mall's students, Simon Flexner, noted that Mall's pedagogical approach could not always replicate the same results elsewhere. The available study guides and the competence of the instructors were found to be essential to the success of Mall's curriculum.

One of Mall's other goals was to raise the prestige of anatomists and the study of anatomy in America. During his tenure, anatomy was deemed as a basic science, a prerequisite for entering the highly respected surgical field. Mall's convictions led him to expand the anatomical curricula to include histology, histogenesis, and embryology. The collective research spearheaded by Mall and his coworkers at the Department of Anatomy demonstrated an impact comparable to that of the surgical field.

Mall's call for educational reform extended beyond anatomy to medical education in general. Mall argued that the largest obstacle was the professors and practitioners themselves, many of whom were involved in private practice. This, coupled with the lack of regulation of tenure faculty meant that students had greatly diminished learning opportunities. Mall was a strong critic of private practice, and felt strongly for the concept of a full-time faculty. Mall often argued with William Osler as a result of their contrasting opinions. He supported the ideals of William H. Welch, Abraham Flexner, and John D. Rockefeller in their bid for the reform of medical education. However, Mall defended the importance of research, criticizing the implementation of policies that established full-time teaching faculty, treating their classroom obligations as an obstacle to scientific advancement.

== Embryology ==
=== Contributions to embryology ===
Mall started his collection of human embryos in 1887 while working under William H. Welch at the Johns Hopkins University. The collection continued to grow while working with Wilhelm His, further expanding after his return to the Johns Hopkins University School of Medicine. In his 1917 paper studying abnormal embryo and fetus growth, Mall reported that his collection consisted of approximately 2000 embryos, growing quickly at the rate of about 400 a year.

Mall's collection became the foundation of the Carnegie Collection and his embryos were extensively used in scientific papers and reviews. Before founding the Department of Embryology at the Carnegie Institution, Mall looked for ways to standardize the study of human embryology. In collaboration with Franz Keibel, Mall published the Manual of Human Embryology in 1912. The book described the piecewise development of the human body from the embryo and compiled substantial knowledge from the available scientific literature.

Mall was also the first person to stage human embryos using photographs of their external structure, first grouping 226 human embryos into 14 stages. This was then expanded to 23 stages by Mall's successor, George L. Streeter. These 23 stages are the standard for the study of embryology and the Carnegie Collection of Embryos.

=== Department of Embryology ===
Mall advocated strongly for the establishment of a specialized embryological institution. In a proposal to the Carnegie Institute for Science, Mall noted the sluggish advancements in anatomy and embryology compared to astronomy. This was despite the greater number of faculty and additional resources present within the biological fields. Mall championed the recruitment of scientific talents and the conducive organization of research institutes to efficiently conduct research. In addition, Mall described the institute as a catalyst for the consolidation of embryonic collections which were scattered, poorly maintained, and possessed insufficient detail at that time.

Mall laid out several key requirements for this specialized institution. Firstly, it would require a large embryo collection for research. Subsequently, this collection would have to be staged to furnish a more complete understanding of embryonic development in humans. Secondly, the institution would have to be in a large city with a significant medical establishment, such as Berlin, Boston, or Baltimore. This would allow the institution to work closely with gynecologists and private practitioners to expand the collection. Lastly, Mall hoped that the institution would be located in a hub of medical activity where research and medical breakthroughs were continually occurring.

In early 1913, Mall received a preliminary grant of $6000 from the Carnegie Institute for Science to organize a broad-spectrum lab addressing scientific problems of varying disciplines. The nature of the work was intentionally designed to be impossible to achieve without collaboration; this was to demonstrate the validity of Mall's argument for an entire Department of Embryology. In the next year, Mall recruited four researchers and many other skilled technicians, modelers, and artists from Europe and the United States to carry out the process of staging the embryos. This group of researchers eventually became the basis of the Department of Embryology. By the end of 1914, Mall successfully obtained a $15,000 grant to found and chair the Department of Embryology at the Carnegie Institution of Washington, that was to be housed in the Johns Hopkins University campus. He served as its first director, assisted by George Linius Streeter, who took over the Directorship on Mall's death.

== Scientific research ==
In his 1905 publication in the American Journal of Anatomy, Mall was the first to show that both the main arteries and the primary veins of the embryo pig could be reached by via the delivery of India Ink directly into the blood vessels of the liver.

In 1907, Mall identified a precursor of the internal jugular vein in the head, naming it as the anterior cardinal vein. In addition, Mall showed that the anterior cardinal vein was implicated in the formation of dural sinuses.

In a 1910 article entitled "Determination of the age of human embryos and fetuses" in the Manual of Human Embryology, Mall demonstrated that the nascent atrium of the heart could be identified based on the close proximity of endothelium to the heart muscle. This is in contrast to the significant distance observed between the endothelium and the heart muscle in other localities in the embryonic heart.

In 1913, Mall developed an empirical method for calculating the age of a human fetus. Namely, the age of an embryo could be obtained by:

Embryo Age (days) = sqrt of total foetal length in cm X 100.

== Publications ==
- Mall, Franklin P. (1891). "A human embryo twenty-six days old". Journal of Morphology. 5 (3): 459–480. doi:10.1002/jmor.1050050304. S2CID 85007952.
- Mall, Franklin P. (1897). "Development of the human coelom". Journal of Morphology. 12 (2): 395–453. doi:10.1002/jmor.1050120206. S2CID 83940104.
- Mall, Franklin P. (1898). "Development of the ventral abdominal walls in man". Journal of Morphology. 14 (2): 347–366. doi:10.1002/jmor.1050140208. S2CID 85185113.
- Mall, Franklin P. (1900). "The architecture and blood-vessels of the dog's spleen". Zeitschrift für Morphologie und Anthropologie. 2 (1): 1–42.
- Mall, Franklin P. (1903). "Note on the collection of human embryos in the Anatomical Laboratory of Johns Hopkins University". Johns Hopkins Hospital Bulletin. 14: 143.
- Mall, Franklin P. (1903). "On the circulation through the pulp of the dog's spleen". American Journal of Anatomy. 2 (3): 315–322. doi:10.1002/aja.1000020304.
- Mall, Franklin P. (1905). "On the Development of the Blood-Vessels of the Brain in the Human Embryo". American Journal of Anatomy. 4: 1–18. doi:10.1002/aja.1000040102.
- Mall, Franklin P. (1905). "On the angle of the elbow". American Journal of Anatomy. 4 (4): 391–404. doi:10.1002/aja.1000040402.
- Mall, Franklin P. (1906). "A study of the structural unit of the liver". American Journal of Anatomy. 5 (3): 227–308. doi:10.1002/aja.1000050302.
- Harrison, Rose G.; Greenman, M. J.; Mall, Franklin P.; Jackson, C. M. (1907). "Observations of the living developing never fiber". The Anatomical Record. 1 (5): 116–128. doi:10.1002/ar.1090010503. S2CID 85998062.
- Mall, Franklin P. (1907). "On measuring human embryos". The Anatomical Record. 1 (6): 129–140. doi:10.1002/ar.1090010602. S2CID 84966723.
- Mall, Franklin P. (1908). "A study of the causes underlying the origin of human monsters". Journal of Morphology. 19: 3–368. doi:10.1002/jmor.1050190102. hdl:2027/chi.21526292. S2CID 84252656.
- Mall, Franklin P. (1909). "On several anatomical characters of the human brain, said to vary according to race and sex, with especial reference to the weight of the frontal lobe". American Journal of Anatomy. 9 (1): 1–32. doi:10.1002/aja.1000090102.
- Franklin P. Mall, Franz Keibel (1910). Manual of Human Embryology, Vol 1. Philadelphia and London, J.B. Lippincott Company.
- Mall, Franklin P. (1911). "On the muscular architecture of the ventricles of the human heart". American Journal of Anatomy. 11 (3): 211–266. doi:10.1002/aja.1000110302.
- Mall, Franklin P. (1912). "On the development of the human heart". American Journal of Anatomy. 13 (3): 249. doi:10.1002/aja.1000130302.
- Franklin P. Mall, Franz Keibel (1912). Manual of Human Embryology, Vol 2. Philadelphia and London, J.B. Lippincott Company.
- Mall, Franklin P. (1912). "Aneurysm of the membraneous septum projecting into the right atrium". The Anatomical Record. 6 (7): 291–298. doi:10.1002/ar.1090060704. S2CID 85040297.
- Mall, Franklin P. (1915). "On the fate of the human embryo in tubal pregnancy". Contributions to Embryology. 1: 1.
- Mall, Franklin P. (1916). "The human magma reticule in normal and in pathological development". Contributions to Embryology. 4 (10): 5–25.
- Mall, Franklin P. (1917). "Cyclopia in the human embryo". Contributions to Embryology. 6: 15.
- Mall, Franklin P. (1917). "On the frequency of localized anomalies in human embryos and infants at birth". American Journal of Anatomy. 22 (1): 49–72. doi:10.1002/aja.1000220104.
- Mall, Franklin P. (1918). "On the age of human embryos". American Journal of Anatomy. 23 (2): 397–422. doi:10.1002/aja.1000230206.
