= Berta Scharrer =

German-born American neuroendocrinologist

Berta Vogel Scharrer
- Born: Berta Vogel; December 1, 1906; Munich, Germany
- Died: July 23, 1995 (aged 88)
- Citizenship: Germany; United States
- Education: Ludwig-Maximilians-Universität München
- Known for: Pioneering work in neuroendocrinology
- Awards: National Medal of Science
- Scientific career
- Fields: Neuroendocrinology

Berta Vogel Scharrer (December 1, 1906 – July 23, 1995) was a German-American scientist who helped to found the scientific discipline now known as neuroendocrinology.

== Career ==
She received her Ph.D. from the Ludwig-Maximilians-Universität München in Germany in 1930. She worked at the Ludwig-Maximilians-Universität München with Professor Karl von Frisch, who obtained the Nobel Prize in Physiology or Medicine in 1973 for his work with bees. After completing her education, Berta and her husband, Ernst Scharrer embarked on a remarkable scientific career together. Their journey began at the Research Institute of Psychiatry at the Ludwig-Maximilians-Universität München, where Berta focused on the study of spirochaete infections in the brains of birds and amphibians.

Berta Scharrer was forced to emigrate at the onset of the Holocaust in 1937. She arrived with Ernst in the United States with a total of eight dollars. Ernst had secured a Rockefeller Fellowship at the University of Chicago and Berta continued her research, initially working with Drosophila and later with cockroaches and related species for the remainder of her research career. The couple's academic journey took them to various institutions, with Ernst accepting academic appointments that determined their locations. Throughout their career, they conducted groundbreaking research on neurosecretion, investigating the connection between the nervous and endocrine systems. Berta specialized in the study of invertebrates, while Ernst focused on vertebrates.

In 1955, they founded the Department of Anatomy at the Albert Einstein College of Medicine in New York. It was at this point that Berta received her first salaried academic appointment, and she played an integral role in the department, not only as a scientist but also as a dedicated teacher.

She served as the 55th president of the American Association of Anatomists from 1978 to 1979.

As her career progressed, Berta made significant contributions to the study of neuropeptides and neuroimmunology, entering these emerging fields in her later years and serving as the associate editor of the journal Advances in Immunology. She continued her research until her death in 1995 at the age of 88.

Berta received numerous awards and honors throughout her career, including the National Medal of Science from President Ronald Reagan in 1983. Her work left a lasting impact on the fields of neurobiology and endocrinology, and she continues to be respected and influential among anatomists.

== Personal life ==
Berta Vogel Scharrer was born December 8, 1906, in Munich, Germany, into a prosperous, well-educated family. Her father, Karl Phillip Vogel was a judge serving as vice president of the Federal Court of Bavaria. As a young student she became interested in biology, and knew she wanted to be a biologist from a young age.

Berta Vogel married Ernst Scharrer in 1934. They met as graduate students working under von Frisch. The couple fled Germany in 1937, Ernst accepting a Rockefeller Fellowship at the University of Chicago; they became U.S. citizens in 1945.

Ernst died in 1965 in a swimming accident. The couple had no children.

== Death ==
Scharrer conducted research and taught at Einstein College until her retirement in 1995, five months before her death at age 88.

== Honors ==
Scharrer was elected a Fellow of the American Academy of Arts and Sciences in 1967. She earned honorary degrees from various universities, including one from Harvard in 1982, "as well as a nomination for a Nobel Prize for her pioneering research in brain chemicals". In 1983, she was awarded the National Medal of Science by President Reagan, for "demonstrating the central role of neurosecretion and neuropeptides in the integration of animal function and development."

== Legacy ==
Scharrer's studies of invertebrates, particularly cockroaches, was so extensive that her name was given to a species of cockroach, known as the Escala scharrerae, found in Australasia. Scharrer was awarded the Schleiden Medal in 1983 and was a member of the National Academy of Sciences.

== Some publications ==
=== Establishment of the basis of invertebrate neurosecretion ===
1. 1938 The structure of the ring-gland (corpus allatum) in normal and lethal larvae of Drosophila melanogaster. Proc. Natl. Acad. Sci. U.S.A., 24:236–242.
2. 1939 The differentiation between neuroglia and connective tissue sheath in the cockroach (Periplaneta americana). J. Comp. Neurol., 70:77–88.
3. 1941 Neurosecretion. II. Neurosecretory cells in the central nervous system of cockroaches. J. Comp. Neurol., 74:93–108.
4. 1944 Neurosecretion VI. A comparison between the intercerebralis-cardiacum-allatum system of the insects and the hypothalamo-hypophyseal system of the vertebrates. Biol. Bull., 87:242–251.
5. 1946 The role of the corpora allata in the development of Leucophaea maderae (Orthoptera). Endocrinology, 38:35–45.

=== Ultrastructural studies on invertebrate neurosecretory systems ===
1. 1963 The ultrastructure of the corpus cardiacum of the insect Leucophaea maderae. Z. Zellforsch., 60:761–796.
2. 1966 Ultrastructural study of the regressing prothoracic glands of blattarian insects. Z. Zellforsch., 69:1–21.
3. 1967 Electron microscopic and biochemical characterization of collagen in blattarian insects. J. Cell Biol., 33:385–393.
4. 1970 Ultrastructural study of the sites of origin and release of a cellular product in the corpus allatum of insects. Proc. Natl. Acad. Sci., 66:244–245.

=== Neuropeptides and neuroimmunology ===
1. 1982 Opioid binding sites in the midgut of the insect Leucophaea maderae (Blattaria). Life Sci., 31:1397–1400.
2. 1987 Gastrin/CCK-like immunoreactivity in the corpus cardiacum-corpus allatum complex of the cockroach Leucophaea maderae. Cell Tissue Res., 248:595–598.
3. 1990 Immunocytochemical localization and immunochemical characterization of an insulin-related peptide in the insect Leucophaea maderae. Cell Tissue Res., 259:265–273.
4. 1992 (D-Ala2) deltorphin I binding and pharmacological evidence for a special subtype of delta opioid receptor on human and invertebrate immune cells. Proc. Natl. Acad. Sci. U.S.A., 89:9316–9320.
5. 1994 Microglia in invertebrate ganglia. Proc. Natl. Acad. Sci. U.S.A., 91:9180–9184.
