= Jeffrey Laitman =

American anthropologist and anatomist

Jeffrey Todd Laitman
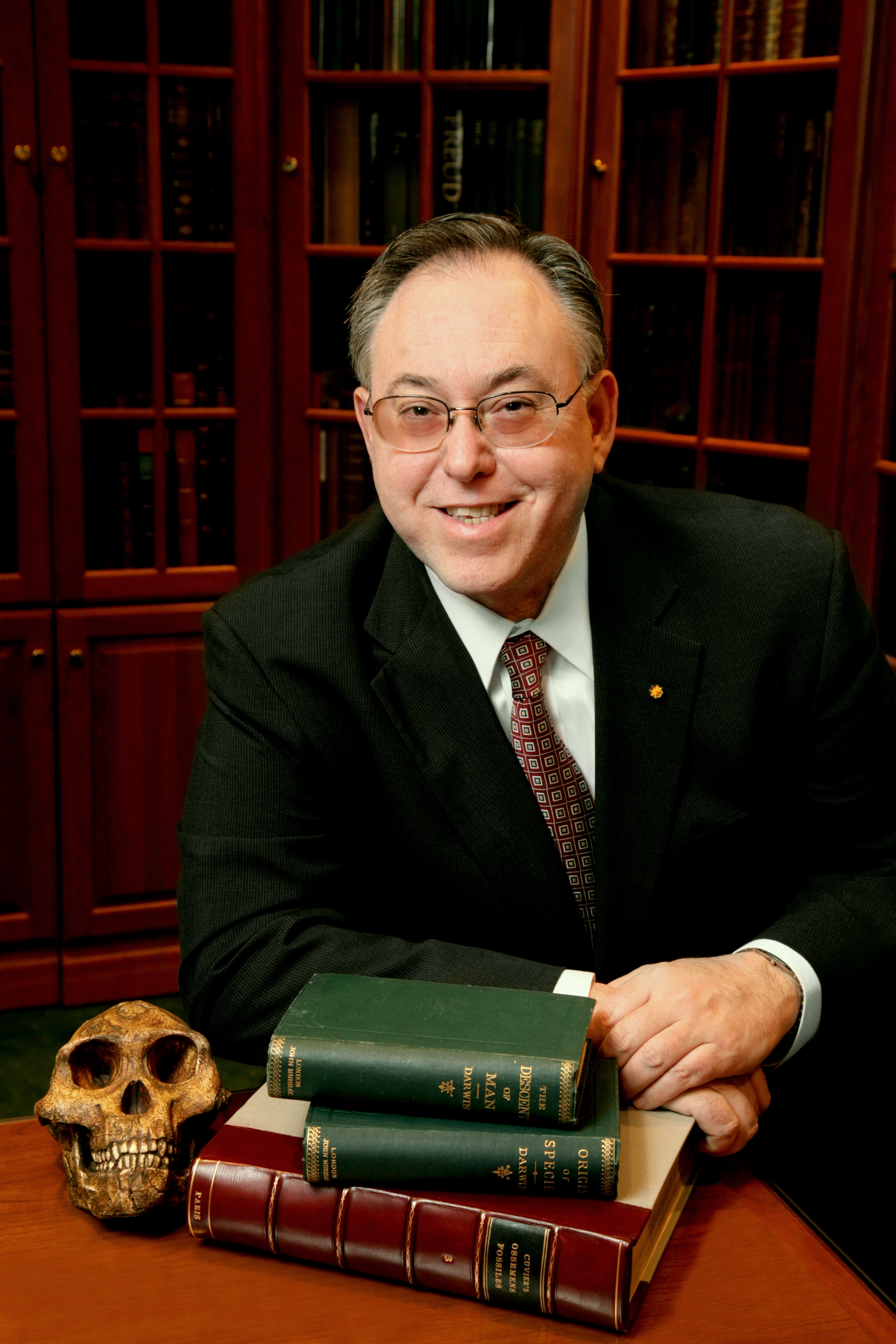
- Dr. Jeffrey Laitman
- Born: 13 October 1951 (age 75)
- Education: Brooklyn College, Yale University,
- Occupations: Anatomist, physical anthropologist

Jeffrey Todd Laitman (born October 13, 1951) is an American anatomist and physical anthropologist whose science has combined experimental, comparative, and paleontological studies to understand the development and evolution of the human upper respiratory and vocal tract regions. He is a Distinguished Professor of the Icahn School of Medicine at Mount Sinai (formerly Mount Sinai School of Medicine) in New York City where he holds other positions, including professor and director of the Center for Anatomy and Functional Morphology, Professor of Otolaryngology and Professor of Medical Education.

== Scientific research ==
Laitman's laboratory at Mount Sinai explores both basic biological aspects of developmental change in a range of mammals—from rodents to nonhuman primates to whales—and how these systems have changed through time. In the area of development, Laitman and colleagues have made considerable strides in investigating change in the breathing, swallowing and vocalizing patterns of human infants. This work has had considerable implications for understanding both basic human anatomy as well as certain clinical disorders such as Sudden Infant Death Syndrome, also known as Crib Death.

Laitman's research on the evolution of the aerodigestive tract has helped to usher in a new methodology that enables the use of fossil remains as a guide to reconstructing the vocal tract of human ancestors. His work in this area has shed light on the distinguishing features of the human respiratory system and has had particular implications for understanding the origins of human speech and language. Laitman's studies have frequently been the source of much discussion on how living humans may differ from other groups, such as Neanderthals. His work has frequently been covered in the lay and scientific press, and he has often appeared in television documentaries on human origins and the evolution of speech and language both in the United States and abroad, such as the award-winning Miracle Planet Series, the BBC Documentary, The Day We Learned to Think, and The History Channel documentary, Clash of the Cavemen.

== Education and teaching ==
He has introduced the use of laparoscopes and robots into first-year anatomy education, and collaborated with medical students to teach musculoskeletal anatomy through yoga and Pilates, the latter innovation having received national awards and recognitions. Laitman and colleagues have also pioneered new approaches to introducing "team-work," "team-responsibility" and "team-teaching," that bring these essential components of physician development early into the medical school curriculum. He has been particularly successful in mentoring faculty, many of whom have won educational awards both from Mount Sinai and international societies. Laitman has created Teaching Assistant programs for advanced medical and graduate students that allow them to learn how to teach while gaining an even greater knowledge of anatomy. He has been the recipient of many recognitions for teaching and mentorship both within Mount Sinai and from societies around the world.

== Biography ==
Laitman took his bachelor's degree at Brooklyn College of the City University of New York, from which he graduated summa cum laude with honors in physical anthropology and history in 1973. Upon graduation from Brooklyn College, he undertook graduate study in physical anthropology and anatomy at Yale University, where he received his M.Phil. in 1975 and Ph.D. in 1977. At Yale Laitman studied under noted anatomist Edmund S. Crelin of the Yale School of Medicine, paleoanthropologist David R. Pilbeam, paleontologist Elwyn Simons, and primate biologists Alison Richard and Robert D. Martin. He also studied under the famous French paleoanthropologist Yves Coppens at the Musée de l'Homme and Collège de France, both as a student and during many subsequent research visits to Paris. In 1976, while still a graduate student, he was appointed lecturer in anatomy at the Yale University School of Medicine and, in 1977, chosen a research fellow of the Human Growth and Development Study Unit at Yale University School of Medicine.

In 1977, Laitman joined the faculty of the Mount Sinai School of Medicine as instructor in anatomy. He is currently distinguished professor of the Mount Sinai School of Medicine, Professor and Director of Anatomy and Functional Morphology, Professor of Otolaryngology, Professor of Medical Education and Director of Gross Anatomy at Icahn School of Medicine at Mount Sinai; and Professor in the Graduate Faculties of Biomedical Sciences of Mount Sinai and of Anthropology of the City University of New York. Laitman is also a research associate at the American Museum of Natural History, and member of the faculty of the New York Consortium in Evolutionary Primatology (NYCEP), a research-training program supported by the National Science Foundation.

== Mentoring, students, and collaborators ==
Laitman has been the research advisor and mentor for many medical and graduate-level students that have gone on to prominent careers in medicine, science, and medical education. Notable amongst these are: comparative anatomists, Joy Reidenberg, Ph.D. and Samuel Marquez, Ph.D.; neurobiologist Patrick J. Gannon, Ph.D.; otologist/neurobiologist, David R. Friedland, M.D., Ph.D; anthropologists Douglas Broadfield, Ph.D. and Anthony Pagano, Ph.D.; developmental anatomist Armand Balboni, Ph.D; head and neck cancer surgeon, Eric Genden, M.D.; and health and exercise specialists, Carrie McCulloch, M.D. and Stephanie Pieczenik Marango, M.D.. He has mentored many students in research and taught over 5,000 medical students over his career. Laitman has also mentored many young scientists from around the world, many of whom have come to work in his Laboratory at Mount Sinai. He collaborates frequently with colleagues both in the United States and abroad on a range of scientific and educational projects.

== Activities in scientific and scholarly societies ==
Laitman is an active member in a number of scientific and scholarly societies, most notably the American Association of Anatomists (AAA), one of the premier scientific and educational societies in the world. He has held many positions in the AAA, including being elected a member of the board of directors from 2006 to 2009. In 2009 Laitman was elected as the 81st president of the association and will serve as president-elect from 2009 to 2011, president from 2011 to 2013, and past president from 2013 to 2015. In 2009 he was elected vice president of The Mount Sinai Alumni, Inc., and in 2011 elected president of that organization. In 2009 he was also elected vice-chair of the Anatomical Committee of the Associated Medical Schools of New York (ASMSNY). Laitman also serves as associate editor and editor for functional and evolutionary morphology for The Anatomical Record, and in that role has overseen many special issues of that journal, such as ones on aquatic mammals, paranasal sinuses, dinosaurs, primate functional anatomy, new world monkey evolution, the anatomy underlying new advances in cochlear and vestibular implants and the evolution of primate special senses.

== Public education and outreach ==
Laitman also frequently offers public lectures on his science and educational topics. He has given addresses at venues both within the United States and abroad such as at: The American Museum of Natural History, The Australian Museum, The American Association for the Advancement of Science (AAAS) Frontiers of Science Lecture Series at the Smithsonian, The Musée de l'Homme, The National Museum of Natural History, The Leakey Lecture at the Field Museum of Natural History and The Chicago Humanities Festival. Laitman has also been deeply involved in bringing science to grade-school and high school students, creating experiences at Mount Sinai and lecturing at public schools in Chicago and New York as part of The Leakey Foundation science outreach programs.

== Notable awards and recognitions ==
- Fellow, American Anthropological Association
- Medal of the Collège de France
- Honorary Fellow, Associazione Per L'Amicizia Fra I Popoli di Italia
- Basmajian/Williams & Wilkins Award of The American Association of Anatomists
- Guest of Honor, 1st Int'l Laryngotracheal Reconstruction Symposium
- 61st James Arthur Lecturer, American Museum of Natural History
- Karl Storz Award, American Society for Pediatric Otolaryngology
- Distinguished Professor of the Mount Sinai School of Medicine
- Daniel C. Baker Award, American Laryngological Association
- Fellow, American Association for the Advancement of Science (AAAS)
- Abraham Jacobi Medallion. The Mount Sinai Alumni
- Fellow, American Association of Anatomists
- Award for Achievement in Medical Education, The Mount Sinai Alumni
- Alfonso Bovero Award, Brazilian Society of Anatomy
- Corresponding Member, Brazilian Society of Anatomy
- The Leakey Foundation Lecturer on Human Origins
- Chinese Society of Anatomical Sciences, Annual Meeting Plenary Lecture on Advances in Anatomy Education
- Chevalier Jackson Lecturer, American Bronchoesophagolocial Association
- Chicago Humanities Festival Featured Lecturer
- Fellow, American Laryngological Association
- Honorary Member, American Broncho-esophagological Association
- Doctor of Medical Science (D.Med.Sc.) Honoris Causa, Medical College of Wisconsin
- Commencement Address, Medical College of Wisconsin
- Henry Gray Distinguished Educator Medal, American Association of Anatomists
- Honorary Member, American Society of Pediatric Otolaryngology
- Benning Lecture, University of Utah

== Representative publications ==
- Laitman, J.T.; Heimbuch, R.C.; Crelin, E.S. (1978). "Developmental change in a basicranial line and its relationship to the upper respiratory system in living primates". Am. J. Anat. 51: 15–34. doi:10.1002/ajpa.1330510103.
- Laitman, J.T.; Heimbuch, R.C.; Crelin, E.C. (1979). "The basicranium of fossil hominids as an indicator of their upper respiratory systems". Am. J. Phys. Anthropol. 51 (1): 15–34. Bibcode:1979AJPA...51...15L. doi:10.1002/ajpa.1330510103.
- Laitman, J.T.; Heimbuch, R.C. (1982). "The basicranium of Plio-Pleistocene hominids as an indicator of their upper respiratory systems". Am. J. Phys. Anthropol. 59 (3): 323–343. Bibcode:1982AJPA...59..323L. doi:10.1002/ajpa.1330590315. PMID 6818861.
- Laitman, J.T. (1984). "The anatomy of human speech". Natural History. 93: 20–27.
- Laitman, J.T. (1986). "L'origine du langage articule". La Recherche. 17: 1164–1173.
- Magriples, U.; Laitman, J.T. (1987). "Developmental change in the position of the fetal human larynx". Am. J. Phys. Anthropol. 72 (4): 463–472. Bibcode:1987AJPA...72..463M. doi:10.1002/ajpa.1330720406. PMID 3605319.
- Laitman, J.T.; Reidenberg, J.S. (1988). "Advances in understanding the relationship between the skull base and larynx, with comments on the origins of speech". Human Evol. 3 (1–2): 99–109. doi:10.1007/bf02436593. S2CID 85144811.
- Gannon, P. J. Laitman; Eden, A.R. (1988). "The subarcuate fossa and cerebellum in extant primates: Comparative study of a skull-brain interface". Am. J. Phys. Anthropol. 77 (2): 142–163. doi:10.1002/ajpa.1330770202. PMID 3207165.
- Lieberman, P. Laitman; Reidenberg, J.S.; Landahl, K; Gannon, P.J. (1989). "Folk physiology and talking hyoid bones". Nature. 342 (6249): 486–487. doi:10.1038/342486a0. PMID 2685609. S2CID 4250758.
- Eden, A.R.; Laitman, J.T.; Gannon, P.J. (1990). "Mechanisms of middle ear aeration: Anatomic and physiologic evidence in primates". Laryngoscope. 100 (1): 67–75. doi:10.1288/00005537-199001000-00014. PMID 2293703. S2CID 13444890.
- Wolfson, V.P.; Laitman, J.T. (1990). "Ultrasound investigation of fetal human upper respiratory anatomy". Anat. Rec. 227 (3): 363–372. doi:10.1002/ar.1092270312. PMID 2196839. S2CID 44426108.
- Reidenberg, J.S.; Laitman, J.T. (1991). "Effect of basicranial flexion on larynx and hyoid position in rats: An experimental study of skull and soft-tissue interactions". Anat. Rec. 230 (4): 557–69. doi:10.1002/ar.1092300416. PMID 1928761. S2CID 34939271.
- Lieberman, P; Laitman, J.T.; Reidenberg, J.S.; Gannon, P.J. (1992). "The anatomy, physiology, acoustics and perception of speech: Essential elements in analysis of the evolution of speech". J Hum Evol. 23 (6): 447–467. doi:10.1016/0047-2484(92)90046-c.
- Laitman, J.T.; Reidenberg, J.S. (1993). "Specializations of the human upper respiratory and upper digestive tract as seen through comparative and developmental anatomy". Dysphagia. 8 (4): 318–325. doi:10.1007/bf01321770. PMID 8269722. S2CID 23308320.
- Reidenberg, J.S.; Laitman, J.T. (1994). "Anatomy of the hyoid apparatus in Odontoceti: Specializations of their skeleton and musculature as compared with those of terrestrial mammals". Anat. Rec. 240 (4): 598–624. doi:10.1002/ar.1092400417. PMID 7879911. S2CID 35692994.
- Friedland, D.R.; Eden, A.R.; Laitman, J.T. (1995). "Naturally occurring motoneuron cell death in rat upper respiratory tract motor nuclei: A histological, fast DiI and immunocytochemical study in the nucleus ambiguus". J. Neurobiol. 26 (4): 563–578. doi:10.1002/neu.480260409. PMID 7602319.
- Friedland, D.R.; Eden, A.R.; Laitman, J.T. (1995). "Naturally occurring motoneuron cell death in rat upper respiratory tract motor nuclei: A histological, fast-DiI and immunocytochemical study in the hypoglossal nucleus". J. Neurobiol. 27 (4): 520–534. doi:10.1002/neu.480270407. PMID 7561831.
- Laitman, J.T.; Reidenberg, J.S.; Marquez, S.; Gannon, P.J. (1996). "What the nose knows: New understandings of neanderthal upper respiratory tract specializations". Proc. Natl. Acad. Sci. USA. 93 (20): 10543–45. Bibcode:1996PNAS...9310543L. doi:10.1073/pnas.93.20.10543. PMC 38188. PMID 8855213.
- Friedland, D.R.; Eden, A.R.; Laitman, J.T (1996). "Use of the novel carbocyanine tracer fast-DiI for investigating upper respiratory tract cranial nerves in prenatal rats". Lab. Animal Sci. 46 (2): 220–225. PMID 8723242.
- Laitman, J.T.; Reidenberg, J.S. (1997). "The human aerodigestive tract and gastroesophageal reflux: An evolutionary perspective". Am. J. Med. 103 (5A): 3–11. doi:10.1016/s0002-9343(97)00313-6. PMID 9422615.
- Schwartz, J.H., Tattersall, I, Laitman, J.T. (1999) New thoughts on Neanderthal behavior: Evidence from nasal morphology. In: Hominid Evolution-Lifestyles and Survival Strategies, Ullrich, H. ed Gelsenkirchen, Edition Archaea, 166–186.
- Laitman, J.T.; Tattersall, I (2001). "Homo erectus newyorkensis: An Indonesian fossil rediscovered in Manhattan sheds light on the middle phase of human evolution". Anat Rec. 262 (4): 341–343. doi:10.1002/ar.1042. PMID 11275967. S2CID 35310160.
- Márquez S, Lawson W, Schaefer S.D., Laitman J.T. (2002) Anatomy of the nasal accessory sinuses. In: Wackym P.A., Rice D.H., Schaefer S.D., eds. Minimally Invasive Surgery of the Head, Neck, and Cranial Base. Philadelphia, Lippincott, Williams & Wilkins, 153–183.
- Balboni, A.L.; Estenson, T.L.; Reidenberg, J.S.; Bergemann, A.D.; Laitman, J.T. (2005). "Assessing Age Related Ossification of the Petrooccipital Fissure: Laying the foundation for understanding clinicopathologies of the cranial base". Anat. Rec. 282A (1): 38–48. doi:10.1002/ar.a.20149. PMC 1325220. PMID 15584035.
- Laitman, J.T., Noden, D.M., Van De Water, T.R. (2006) Formation of the larynx: from homeobox genes to critical periods. In: Rubin, J.S. (ed.) Diagnosis & Treatment Voice Disorders Plural, San Diego, pp. 3–20.
- Lipan, M; Reidenberg, J.S; Laitman, J.T. (2006). "The anatomy of reflux: A growing health problem affecting structures of the head and neck". Anat Rec B New Anat. 289B (6): 261–270. doi:10.1002/ar.b.20120. PMID 17109421.
- Reidenberg, J.S.; Laitman, J.T. (2007). "Discovery of a low frequency sound source in mysticeti (Baleen Whales): Anatomical establishment of vocal fold homologues". Anat. Rec. 290 (6): 745–760. doi:10.1002/ar.20544. PMID 17516447.
- Balboni, A.L.; Bergemann, A.D.; Reidenberg, J.S.; Laitman, J.T. (2008). "Tuberculosis induced changes to the osseous cranial base and potential effects on hearing". Anat. Rec. 291 (5): 488–490. doi:10.1002/ar.20675. PMID 18383278.
- Márquez, S. Laitman; JT (2008). "Climatic effects on the nasal Complex: A CT imaging, comparative anatomical and morphometric investigation of Macaca mulatta and Macaca fascicularis". Anat Rec. 291 (11): 1420–1445. doi:10.1002/ar.20785. PMID 18951486.
- Laitman, J.T. (2009). "The real Jurassic Park: Joseph Leidy's heirs reconstruct the anatomy of dinosaurs". Anat. Rec. 292 (9): 1237–1239. doi:10.1002/ar.20993. PMID 19711450.
- Laitman, J.T. and Reidenberg, J.S. (2009) The evolution of the human larynx: Nature's great experiment. In: Fried M.P., Ferlito, A. eds. The Larynx, 3rd ed., Plural, San Diego, 19–38.
- Laitman, J.T. (2010). "The magic of the monkey house: New insights into the anatomy that makes primates primates". Anat Rec. 293 (4): 541–543. doi:10.1002/ar.21131. PMID 20235309.
- Reidenberg, J.S. and J.T. Laitman. (2010) Generation of sounds in marine mammals. In: Handbook of Mammalian Vocalization: A Neuroscience Approach. S. Brudzynski, Ed. Elsevier, Philadelphia, PA, 451–468.
- McCulloch, C.; Marango, S.M.; Friedman, E.S.; Laitman, J.T. (2010). "Living AnatoME: Teaching and learning musculoskeletal anatomy through yoga and Pilates". Anat. Sci. Educ. 3 (6): 279–286. doi:10.1002/ase.181. PMID 20890950. S2CID 43049604.
- Laitman, J.T. (2011). "A (New World Monkey) tree grows in Brooklyn". Anat. Rec. 294 (12): 1953–1954. doi:10.1002/ar.21513. PMID 22042581.
- Som, P.M., W.R. Smoker, A.L. Balboni, J.S. Reidenberg, P.A. Hudgins, J.L. Weissman, and J.T. Laitman. (2011) Embryology and anatomy of the neck. In: Head and Neck Imaging, 5th Edition. P.M. Som and H.D. Curtin, eds. Mosby, NY, 2117–2163.
- Laitman, J.T. (2011). "View From the Top: The AAA, Cesar Chavez and the Moral Imperative for Involvement". Am. Assn. Anat. News. 20 (2): 2.
- Laitman, J.T.; Albertine, K. (2011). "Unveiling the mysteries in the trees: The Anatomical Record explores the anatomy and evolution of New World Monkeys". Anat. Rec. 294 (12): 1951–1952. doi:10.1002/ar.21514. PMID 22042607. S2CID 6603386.
- Laitman, J.T. (2011). "View From the Top: Honor thy father, thy mother… and thy mentor". Am. Assn. Anat. News. 20 (3): 2, 14.
- Laitman, J.T. (2011). "View From the Top: You teach people and you train dogs". Am. Assn. Anat. News. 20 (4): 2–3.
- Som, P.M.; Ng, S.A.; Stuchen, C.; Tang, C.Y.; Lawson, W.; Laitman, J. T. (2012). "The MR Imaging identification of the facial muscles and the subcutaneous musculoaponeurotic system". Neurographics. 2: 35–45. doi:10.3174/ng.1120022.
- Bluestone, C.D.; Pagano, A.S.; Swartz, C.D.; Laitman, J.T. (2012). "Consequences of evolution: Is rhinosinusitis, like otitis media, a unique disease in humans?". Otolaryngol Head Neck Surg. 147 (6): 986–991. doi:10.1177/0194599812461892. PMID 23014995. S2CID 21495722.
- Laitman, J.T.; Reidenberg, J.S. (2013). "Evolution and development of human swallowing: The most important function we least appreciate". Otolaryngol Clin N Am. 45 (6): 923–935. doi:10.1016/j.otc.2013.09.005. PMID 24262951.
- Adam, A.; Cazau, D.; Gandilhon, N.; Fabre, B.; Laitman, J.T.; Reidenberg, J.S. (2013). "New acoustic model for Humpback whale sound production". Applied Acoustics. 74 (10): 1182–1190. doi:10.1016/j.apacoust.2013.04.007.
- Cazau, D.; Adam, A.; Laitman, J.T.; Reidenberg, J.S. (2013). "Understanding the intentional acoustic behavior of humpback whales: A production-based approach". J. Acoust. Soc. Am. 134 (3): 2268–2273. Bibcode:2013ASAJ..134.2268C. doi:10.1121/1.4816403. PMID 23967956.
- Márquez, S., A. S Pagano, E.Delson, and J.T Laitman (2014) Examining the Nasal Complex of Neanderthals and other Later Pleistocene Human Fossils via CT and 3-D Geometric Morphometric Approaches: Analysis of Form, Function and Adaptation? Anat. Rec., in press.
- Smith, T.D., J.T. Laitman, K.P. Bhatnagar (2014) The shrinking anthropoid nose, the human vomeronasal organ, and the language of anatomical reduction. Anat. Rec., in press.
- Pagano, A.S. and J.T. Laitman in press Three-dimensional geo-morphometric analysisof the nasopharyngeal boundaries and its functional integration with the face and external basicranium among extant hominoids. Anat. Rec.

== See also ==
- Animal communication
- Evolutionary linguistics
- Human evolution
- Neurobiological origins of language
- Origin of language
- Origin of speech
- Physical anthropology
- Recent African origin of modern humans
