= Charles Rupert Stockard =

American anatomist and zoologist

Charles Rupert Stockard (1879–1939) was an American anatomist and zoologist.

He was born in Stoneville, Mississippi. In 1906, he joined the Department of Anatomy at Cornell Medical College. He became a professor of anatomy in 1911. He was the president of the American Association of Anatomists (1928–1930). He studied zoology under Thomas Hunt Morgan. He received his PhD in zoology from Columbia University in 1906.

He spent years conducting experiments on the effects of alcohol on germ cells, embryos and offspring. Stockard tested the effects of alcohol intoxication on the offspring of pregnant guinea pigs. He discovered that repeated alcohol intoxication in the guinea pigs produced defects and malformations in their offspring that was passed down to two or more generations. His results were challenged by the biologist Raymond Pearl who performed the same experiments with chickens. Pearl discovered that the offspring of the chickens that had been exposed to alcohol were not defected but were healthy. He attributed his findings to the detrimental effects of alcohol only on the eggs and sperm which were already weak, the strong eggs and sperm were unaffected by alcohol intoxication. Pearl argued that his results had a Darwinian, not a Lamarckian explanation.

Other controversial experiments by Stockard included producing teratology in fetuses by inducing hypoxia in the mother. He was the managing editor of American Journal of Anatomy and the coeditor of the Journal of Experimental Zoology.

Stockard was elected to the United States National Academy of Sciences in 1922 and the American Philosophical Society in 1924.

He served as the 18th president of the Association of American Anatomists from 1928 to 1930.

== Publications ==
- Hormones and Structural Development (1927)
- The Physical Basis of Personality (1931)
