= Valerie Dean O'Loughlin =

American professor

Academic background
- Education: College of William and Mary
- Alma mater: Indiana University Bloomington

Academic work
- Discipline: Biology
- Sub-discipline: Anatomy
- Institutions: Indiana University School of Medicine

Valerie Dean O'Loughlin is a Clinical Professor of Anatomy and Cell Biology at the Indiana University School of Medicine, Bloomington, co-author of two anatomy textbooks, now in their 3rd and 5th editions, and a Fellow of the American Association of Anatomists.

== Career ==
O'Loughlin received a bachelor of science in anthropology and physics at the College of William and Mary in 1989, and a PhD in biological anthropology from Indiana University Bloomington in 1995. She serves as Assistant Director of Undergraduate Education for the Medical Sciences Program and oversees the Education Track in Anatomy PhD program at Indiana University Bloomington. She teaches undergraduate, graduate and medical students at Indiana University Bloomington and has received national recognition for her teaching, including the American Association of Anatomists 2018 Henry Gray Distinguished Educator Award. She is a Fellow of the American Association of Anatomists (AAA), President-Emeritus of the Human Anatomy and Physiology Society (HAPS), and is a co-author of two undergraduate textbooks: McKinley/O'Loughlin/Harris, Human Anatomy (5th edition), and McKinley/O'Loughlin/Bidle, Anatomy and Physiology: An Integrative Approach (3rd edition).
