= Palmar crease =

Skin wrinkles in the palm of the hand

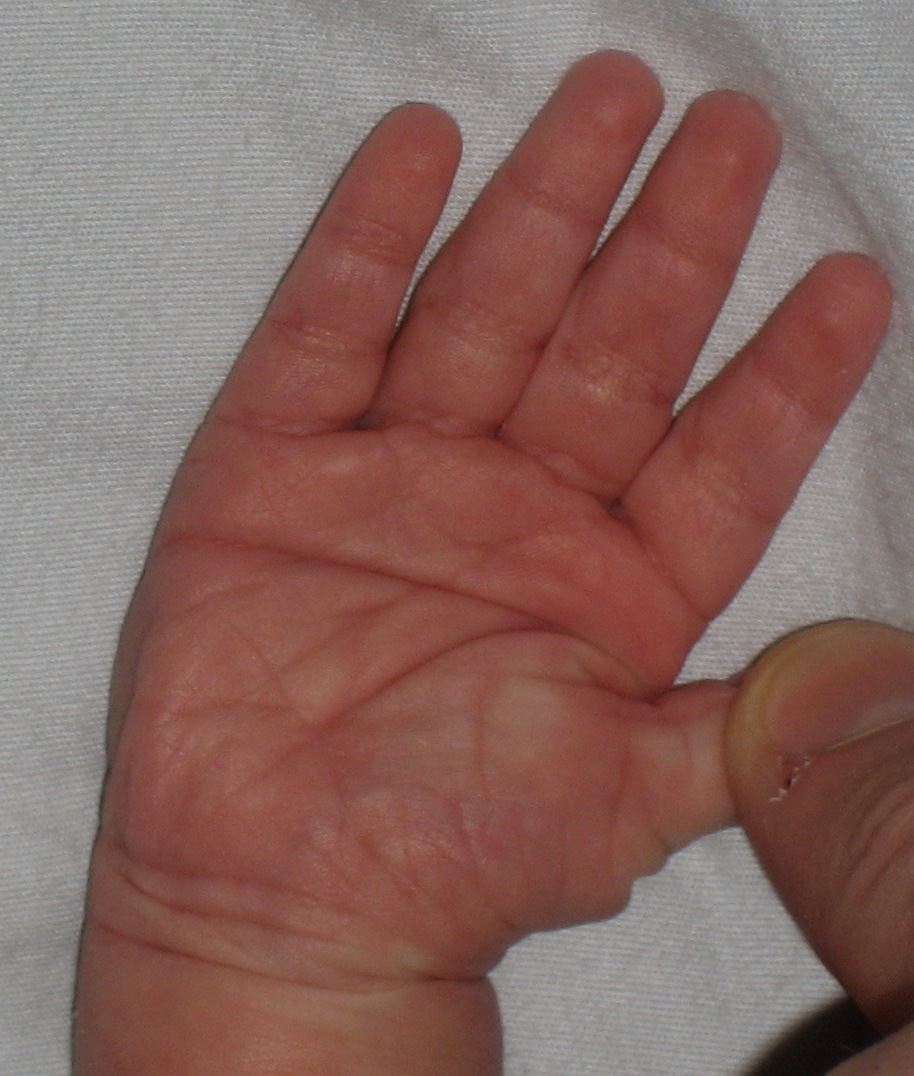
A single transverse palmar crease, one type of palmar crease.

A palmar crease is a type of crease on the palm. A single transverse palmar crease also called simian crease is sometimes associated with Down syndrome. Other types of creases include the Sydney crease and the Suwon, or double transverse palmar crease.

Analysis of palmar creases is not very objective on the contrary to fingerprint analysis. Palmar creases are sometimes used as a preoperative landmark for identification of deep anatomical structures. This method was shown to be unuseful.
