= Frank Baker (physician) =

American physician (1841–1918)

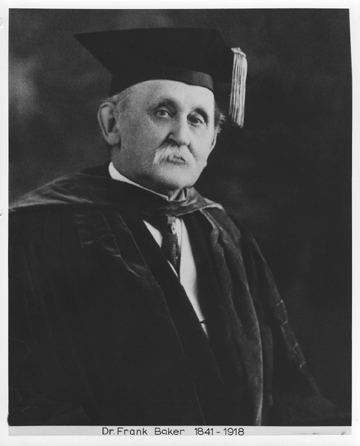
- Dr. Frank Baker
- Born: August 22, 1841; Pulaski, New York
- Died: October 30, 1918 (aged 77); Washington DC
- Occupations: Doctor, Professor, Director of the National Zoo
- Employer(s): Georgetown University, Smithsonian, United States Army
- Title: Doctor

Frank Baker (August 22, 1841 – September 30, 1918) was an American physician and superintendent of the National Zoo in Washington, DC.

He was born in Pulaski, New York, on August 22, 1841. In 1861, he enlisted into the Union Army, fighting in The Second Battle of Bull Run, Battle of Fredericksburg, Battle of Chancellorsville, and Battle of Seven Pines. In 1863, he left the army and became a clerk in Washington DC. There he became friends with Walt Whitman and John Burroughs. After the war, he got his undergraduate degree from George Washington University and his medical degree at Georgetown University.

In 1881, he was involved with the treatment of President James Garfield after he had been shot, and there he met George Kennan and Alexander Graham Bell. In 1883, Baker became a professor of anatomy at Georgetown University, and in 1888 he co-founded the National Geographic Society. In 1889 he was made acting director of the National Zoo, and in 1893 was made official director of the zoo. From 1895 to 1897 he served as the fourth president of the Association of American Anatomists. He retired in 1916, and died on September 30, 1918.
