= Lynne Opperman =

American researcher

Lynne A. Opperman
- Born: Johannesburg, South Africa

Academic background
- Education: BSc, Zoology and Psychology, 1979, PhD, Developmental Biology, 1985, University of the Witwatersrand

Lynne A. Opperman is an American researcher. Prior to the start of the 2021–22 academic year, Opperman was named interim dean of the Texas A&M University College of Dentistry.

== Early life and education ==
Opperman was born and raised in Johannesburg, South Africa. She attended the University of the Witwatersrand for her Bachelor of Science degree and Ph.D. before moving to the United States for her postdoctoral fellowships.

== Career ==
Following her fellowships, Opperman joined the faculty at the University of Virginia School of Medicine as an assistant professor in research. She eventually left to join Texas A&M University in 1996. During her early tenure at Texas A&M, Opperman served as president of the Craniofacial Biology Group for the International Association for Dental Research and on various editorial boards. In 2011, while serving as the director of technology development and professor in biomedical sciences, she was named president-elect of the American Association of Anatomists. She served as the 82nd president of the American Association of Anatomists from 2013 to 2015.

As a result of her research, Opperman was awarded the title of Regents Professor by the Texas A&M University System Board of Regents in 2015. Following this, she was named the interim department head for Texas A&M's biomedical sciences and was elected to a three-year term as a council delegate for the American Association for the Advancement of Science (AAAS). In 2019, Opperman was one of three Texas A&M faculty members elected as Fellows of the AAAS.

Prior to the start of the 2021–22 academic year, Opperman was named interim dean of the Texas A&M University College of Dentistry. In September 2021, Opperman co-developed a curriculum program to allow fourth-year dental students to administer COVID-19 vaccine.
