= Edgar Allen =

American anatomist and physiologist

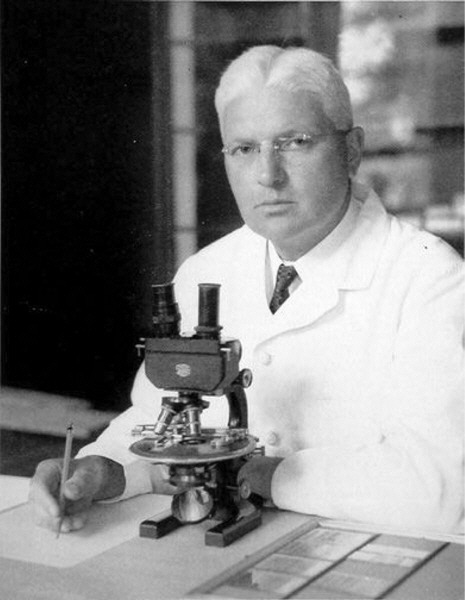
- Allen in 1933
- Born: May 2, 1892; Cañon City, Colorado
- Died: February 3, 1943 (aged 50); New Haven, Connecticut
- Education: Brown University
- Scientific career
- Fields: Anatomy, Physiology, Endocrinology
- Workplaces: University of Missouri; Washington University in St. Louis; Yale University

Edgar Allen (May 2, 1892 – February 3, 1943) was an American anatomist and physiologist. He is known for the discovery of estrogen and his role in creating the field of endocrinology.

Born on Cañon (Canyon) City, Colorado, Allen was educated at Brown University. After serving in World War I he took a position at Washington University School of Medicine in 1919 until, in 1923, he was appointed to the chair of anatomy at the University of Missouri in Columbia, Missouri. Ten years later he was appointed to the chair at Yale University.

At Washington University, he began his studies of sex hormones. While it was commonly believed at the time that the female reproductive cycle was controlled by substance in the corpus luteum, Allen sought the answer in the follicles surrounding the ovum, leading to his discovery of estrogen, though it was identified six years later by Adolf Butenandt in 1929.

He served as the 25th president of the American Association of Anatomists from 1942 to 1943.

Allen died of a heart attack in 1943 while on duty with the United States Coast Guard.
