= Kimberly Topp =

American academic and physical therapist

Kimberly Topp PT, PhD, FAAA
- Born: 1955 (age 70–71); Phoenix, Arizona
- Education: Northern Arizona University (BSc in Physical Therapy) University of California San Francisco (PhD in Anatomy)
- Occupations: Physical Therapist, Teacher, Researcher
- Years active: 1993-present
- Employer: University of California San Francisco
- Known for: Peripheral Neuropathy, Anatomy education
- Spouse: Bruce Topp
- Awards: 1999 California Physical Therapy Association Faculty Publication Award, 2002 Steven J. Rose Lecturer, 2006 Henry J. Kaiser Teaching Award, 2020 A.J. Ladman Exemplary Service Award Award (AAA)
- Honours: 2010 Fellow of the American Association of Anatomists (FAAA), 2015 Honorary Fellow of the Anatomical Society
- Website: msk.ucsf.edu/content/kimberly-topp-phd-pt

Kimberly S. Topp is an American physical therapist and a Professor Emeritus and Physical Therapy Chair at the UCSF School of Medicine. Her research and clinical interests are focused on the relationships of structure and function in the peripheral nerves, the pathobiology behind peripheral neuropathies, and treatments for those diseases. As of February 2026, her 70 publications have received 3,454 citations and contribute to an h-index score of 32.

== Early life and education ==
Kimberly Topp, born in 1955, grew up in Phoenix, Arizona with her mother Frances, a homemaker and homeschooler, and her father James, a Navy veteran of the Korean War who changed careers to become a graphic artist. Topp grew up participating in charity work including running errands for a disabled woman and working with migrant workers. After completing eighth grade, she was hired by many families to babysit and do a variety of housework for them. When her family moved to Flagstaff, Arizona from Phoenix, she transitioned to taking care of farm animals such as horses, chickens, and rabbits. While she was in high school, Topp worked a full-time job in retail and eventually was promoted to assistant manager at the store before she graduated. Topp says that "juggling school and work taught her valuable life skills such as responsibility and following through on a project."

Topp met her husband Bruce after high school while he was still a police officer. They eventually married and in 1984, Bruce earned his Ph.D. in educational psychology from Arizona State University after only 18 months in the program.

Kimberly Topp earned her Bachelor of Science in physical therapy at Northern Arizona University in 1981, her Ph.D. in anatomy and cell biology at University of California, Davis in 1990, and her postdoctoral in anatomy at University of California, San Francisco (UCSF) in 1994.

== Research and teaching career ==
In 2004, she became an elected member of the Academy of Medical Educators at UCSF and was also a part of the UCSF Academic Senate from 1998-2017. During her time as Chair of Physical Therapy, she oversaw the development of the entry-level Doctor of Physical Therapy Program, PhD, and Orthopedic Residency programs. In 2013, Topp became the President-Elect of the American Association for Anatomy (AAA) until 2015, when she officially became the 83rd President of the organization. In 2017, she became the Immediate Past-President until 2019.

Topp has received funding for her research through the National Institutes of Health. Her project titled "Corneal Herpetic Infection: Axonal Transport" was funded from 1990-1991. Her project titled "Axonal Transport and Peripheral Nerve Function" was funded from 1997-2002.

During her career, Topp had many mentors, including Hugh "Pat" Patterson, Ph.D., a human anatomy professor. She learned how to be a "focused and passionate teacher" from Patterson and also says that she has learned a lot from her students.

== Awards and honors ==
The College of Health Professions at Northern Arizona University awarded Topp the Centennial Alumni Award in 1997. In 1999, she was awarded the Physical Therapist Faculty Publication Award by the California Physical Therapy Association. In 2002, Topp was given the title of Steven J. Rose Lecturer by the School of Medicine at Washington University. From 2005-2015, she was a Sexton Sutherland Endowed Chair in Human Anatomy at UCSF. She was awarded the Henry J. Kaiser Award for Excellence in Teaching by UCSF in 2006.

Starting in 2010, Topp has been a fellow of the American Association for Anatomy (AAA). In 2015, she was named an honorary fellow by The Anatomical Society. Also in 2015, she was chosen by UCSF students to give The Last Lecture, where one professor each year is chosen by students to answer the question "If you have one lecture to give, what would you say?" Her most recent award was the A.J. Ladman Exemplary Service Award, given to her in 2020 by the American Association for Anatomy. Topp said that the "honor itself is humbling" and decided to give the money she was awarded back to the AAA.

== Selected publications ==
- Webb, EM; Cotton, JB; Kane, K; Straus, CM; Topp, KS; Naeger, DM (2014). "Teaching point of care ultrasound skills in medical school: keeping radiology in the driver's seat". Acad Radiol. 21: 893–901. doi:10.1016/j.acra.2014.03.001. PMID 24928158..
- Smoot, B; Paul, SM; Aouizerat, BE; Elboim, C; Levine, JD; Abrams, G; Hamolsky, D; Neuhaus, J; Schmidt, B; West, C; Topp, K; Miaskowski, C (2014). "Side of cancer does not influence limb volumes in women prior to breast cancer surgery". Lymphat Res Biol. 12: 189–93. doi:10.1089/lrb.2013.0038. PMC 4171111. PMID 24834791.
- Boyd, BS; Topp, KS; Coppieters, MW (2013). "Impact of movement sequencing on sciatic and tibial nerve strain and excursion during the straight leg raise test in embalmed cadavers". J Orthop Sports Phys Ther. 43: 398–403. doi:10.2519/jospt.2013.4413. PMID 23633619..
- Wamsley, M; Staves, J; Kroon, L; Topp, K; Hossaini, M; Newlin, B; Lindsay, C; O'Brien, B (2012). "The impact of an interprofessional standardized patient exercise on attitudes toward working in interprofessional teams". J Interprof Care. 26: 28–35. doi:10.3109/13561820.2011.628425. PMID 22233365..
- Topp, KS; Boyd, BS (2012). "Peripheral nerve: from the microscopic functional unit of the axon to the biomechanically loaded macroscopic structure". J Hand Ther. 25: 142–51, quiz 152. doi:10.1016/j.jht.2011.09.002. PMID 22133662..
- Topp, KS; Boyd, BS (2006). "Structure and biomechanics of peripheral nerves: nerve responses to physical stresses and implications for physical therapist practice". Phys Ther. 86: 92–109. doi:10.1093/ptj/86.1.92. PMID 16386065..
