= Dermatoglyphics =

Scientific study of finger- and toeprints

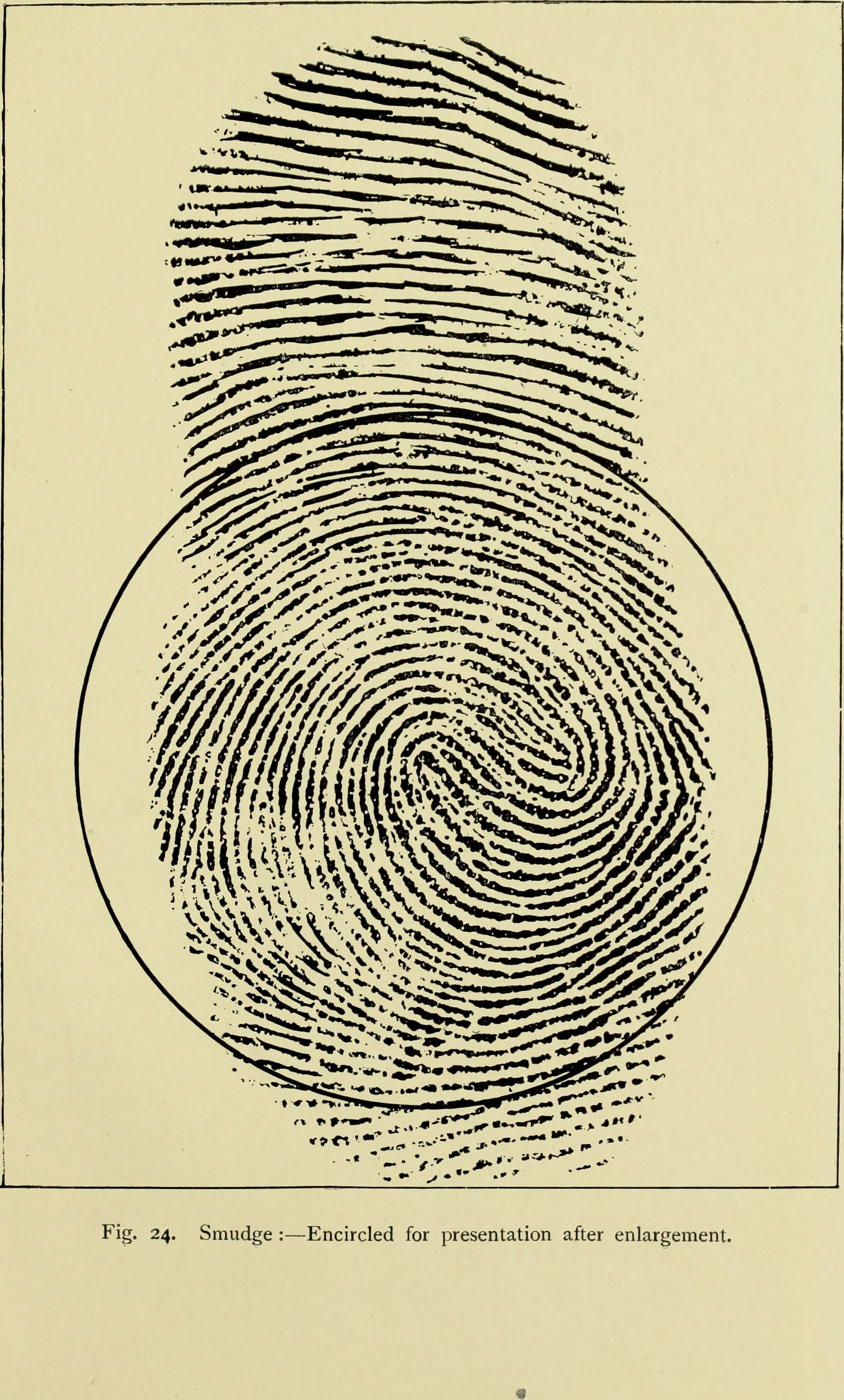
Guide to fingerprint identification

Dermatoglyphics (from Ancient Greek derma 'skin' and glyph 'carving') is the scientific study of fingerprints, lines, mounts and shapes of hands, as distinct from the superficially similar pseudoscience of palmistry.

Dermatoglyphics also refers to the making of naturally occurring ridges on certain body parts, namely palms, fingers, soles, and toes. These are areas where hair usually does not grow, and these ridges allow for increased grip when picking up objects or walking barefoot.

In a 2009 report, the scientific basis underlying dermatoglyphics was questioned by the National Academy of Sciences, for the discipline's reliance on subjective comparisons instead of conclusions drawn from the scientific method.

== History ==
1823 marks the beginning of the scientific study of papillary ridges of the hands and feet, with the work of Jan Evangelista Purkyně.

By 1858, Sir William Herschel, 2nd Baronet, while in India, became the first European to realize the value of fingerprints for identification.

Sir Francis Galton conducted extensive research on the importance of skin-ridge patterns, demonstrating their permanence and advancing the science of fingerprint identification with his 1892 book Fingerprints.

In 1893, Sir Edward Henry published the book The classification and uses of fingerprints, which marked the beginning of the modern era of fingerprint identification and is the basis for other classification systems.

In 1929, Harold Cummins and Charles Midlo M.D., together with others, published the influential book Fingerprints, Palms and Soles, a bible in the field of dermatoglyphics.

In 1945, Lionel Penrose, inspired by the works of Cummins and Midlo, conducted his own dermatoglyphic investigations as a part of his research into Down syndrome and other congenital medical disorders.

In 1976, Schaumann and Alter published the book Dermatoglyphics in Medical Disorders, which summarizes the findings of dermatoglyphic patterns under disease conditions.

In 1982, Seltzer, et al., conducted a study on patients with breast cancer, and concluded that the presence of six or more whorls on a woman's fingertips indicated her being at high risk for breast cancer.

Although the study of dermatoglyphics has some adjunctive value in the diagnosis of genetic syndromes (see examples below), there is insufficient evidence to indicate that there is any value in the examination of dermal ridge patterns for the diagnosis of disease or for identifying disease susceptibility.

== Dermatoglyphics and genetic conditions ==
Dermatoglyphics, when correlated with genetic abnormalities, aids in the diagnosis of congenital malformations at birth or soon after.

- Klinefelter syndrome: excess of arches on digit 1, more frequent ulnar loops on digit 2, overall fewer whorls, lower ridge counts for loops and whorls as compared with controls, and significant reduction of the total finger ridge count.
- Cri du chat (5p-): abnormal dermatoglyphics, including single transverse palmar creases and triradii in the t' position on both hands, are associated with 92% of patients, according to a critical review of multiple studies.
- Congenital blindness: Initial data points to abnormal triradius.
- Naegeli–Franceschetti–Jadassohn syndrome: patients lack dermatoglyphics of any kind.
- Noonan syndrome: increased frequency of whorls on fingertips; and the axial triradius t, as in Turner syndrome, is more often in position t' or t" than in controls. Increased incidence of the single transverse palmar crease.
- Trisomy 13 (Patau syndrome): excess of arches on fingertips and single transverse palmar creases in 60% of patients. Additionally, the hallucal fibular arches tend to form "S" patterns.
- Trisomy 18 (Edward's syndrome): 6–10 arches on fingertips and single transverse palmar creases in 30% of patients.
- Trisomy 21 (Down syndrome): people with Down syndrome have a fingerprint pattern with mainly ulnar loops, and a distinct angle between the triradia a, t, and d (the 'adt angle'). Other differences include a single transverse palmar crease ("Simian line") (in 50% of patients), patterns in the hypothenar and interdigital areas, and lower ridge counts along digital midlines, especially in little fingers, which corresponds to finger shortening in those with Down syndrome. There is less variation in dermatoglyphic patterns between people with Down syndrome than between controls, and dermatoglyphic patterns can be used to determine correlations with congenital heart defects in individuals with Down syndrome by examining the left hand digit ridge count minus the right hand digit ridge count, and the number of ridges on the fifth digit of the left hand.
- Turner syndrome: predominance of whorls, though the pattern frequency depends on the particular chromosomal abnormality.
- Rubinstein-Taybi Syndrome: preponderance of broad thumbs, low mean ridge count, and fingerprint patterns occurring on interdigital areas.
- Schizophrenia: A-B ridge counts are generally lower than in controls.
- Tel Hashomer camptodactyly syndrome : Dermatoglyphic characters that need to be present to diagnose THC are: (a) presence of seven or more whorls on digits (these whorls extend beyond the borders of the terminal phalanges), (b) low main line index, caused by the highly vertical orientation of the A to D radiants, and (c) numerous palmar creases that obliterate the normal structure of the ridges and openings of the sweat pores.

== Dermatoglyphics and Medical conditions ==
The relationship between different dermatoglyphic traits and various medical diseases have been widely evaluated.

- Hypertension: A systematic review shows some evidence suggesting that hypertensive patients tend to have an elevated frequency of digital whorl patterns that goes along with having higher average ridge counts than controls.
- Kidney disease: A systematic review shows dermatoglyphic variables such as whorl pattern frequency and TRC have been used to investigate the uncertainty related to origin of several kidney diseases, for instance, WT and APCD type III. .
