= George Linius Streeter =

American embryologist (1873–1948)

George Linius Streeter (1873–1948) was a 20th century American anatomist and world leading embryologist. He was director of the Carnegie Institution of Washington from 1917 to 1940.

He gives his name to Streeter's Developmental Horizon and Streeter's Dysplasia.

== Life ==
Streeter was born on 12 January 1873 at Johnstown, New York to George Austin Streeter, a glove manufacturer, and his wife, Hannah Green Anthony. He completed a general degree at Union College, New York in 1895, then studied Medicine under Prof George Huntington at Columbia University gaining his doctorate (MD) in 1899.

He served his internship at Roosevelt Hospital, New York City then began teaching anatomy at Albany Medical College alongside neurologist Henry Hun. He then spent the year 1902–1903 in Germany studying in Frankfurt under Ludwig Edinger and in Leipzig under Wilhelm His. Following his period with His he began to focus on embryology and the development of the human nervous system in the womb.

In 1904 he joined Johns Hopkins Medical School in Baltimore under Prof Franklin P. Mall. In 1906 he went to the Wistar Institute of Anatomy and Biology in Philadelphia for one academic year, then to the University of Michigan in his first professorship, as professor of gross anatomy.

In 1914 he returned to Baltimore as a research professor with Mall. When Mall died in 1917, he succeeded him in his role as director of the Carnegie Institution of Washington, remaining there for 23 years.

He served as the 17th president of the Association of American Anatomists from 1926 to 1928.

In 1936 he was elected an Honorary Fellow of the Royal Society of Edinburgh.

He died of a heart attack at Gloversville, New York on 27 July 1948.

== Publications ==
- The Cortex of the Brain in the Human Embryo (1907)
- The Development of the Scala Tympani (1917)
- Development of the Auricle in the Human Embryo (1922)
- Focal Deficiencies in Foetal Tissues (1930)
- Development of the Macaque Embryo (1941)

== Family ==
In 1910 he married Julia Allen Smith of Ann Arbor in Michigan. They had one son and two daughters.
