= Kathy Svoboda =

American biologist

Kathy Kay Hartford Svoboda is an American biologist.

== Early life and career ==
Svoboda was raised in Hershey, Nebraska. After graduating from Hershey High School in 1969, Svoboda attended the University of Nebraska Omaha, where she successively earned a bachelor's degree in biology, a master's degree in human genetics, and a doctorate in anatomy. Svoboda completed postdoctoral research at Harvard Medical School, and began her teaching career as an instructor there. In 1987, Svoboda accepted an assistant professorship at the Boston University School of Medicine, where she was elevated to associate professor in 1994. She joined the Texas A&M University College of Dentistry as an associate professor in 1998, was promoted to full professor in 2001, and became a Regents' Professor in 2009.

Svoboda served as th 78th president of the American Association of Anatomists from 2005 to 2007, was named a fellow of the organization in 2009, and received the A.J. Ladman Exemplary Service Medal in 2014. Svoboda was elected a fellow of the American Association for the Advancement of Science in 2021. She was recognized "for distinguished contributions to the study of the influence of the extracellular matrix on development, and for leadership in the field of oral and craniofacial developmental biology."
