= Philip Edward Smith =

American endocrinologist

- Born: January 1, 1884; De Smet, South Dakota, United States
- Died: December 8, 1970 (aged 86); Flourence, Massachusetts
- Education: Pomona College (1908); Cornell University Ph.D., 1912.
- Known for: Study of pituitary gland.
- Scientific career
- Fields: Endocrinology
- Workplaces: University of California; Stanford University; Columbia University

Philip Edward Smith (January 1, 1884 – December 8, 1970) was an American endocrinologist who is best known for his work studying the pituitary gland. He developed methods for removing pituitary glands from tadpoles and rats and showed that such removal resulted in cessation of growth, and atrophy of other endocrine glands such as the adrenal cortex and the reproductive organs. After graduating with a PhD in Anatomy from Cornell University in 1912, he joined the Department of Anatomy, Berkeley California until 1926. From 1927 to 1952 he served as Professor of Anatomy at the College of Physicians and Surgeons at Columbia University. He served as the 24th president of the Association of American Anatomists from 1940 to 1942. He became a research associate at Stanford University, where he published his last paper in 1963.

== Works include ==
- "Hypophysectomy and Replacement Therapy in the rat"
- "The disabilities caused by hypophysectomy and their repair"
