= Single transverse palmar crease =

Crease across the palm of the hand

- Other names: Simian crease, simian line
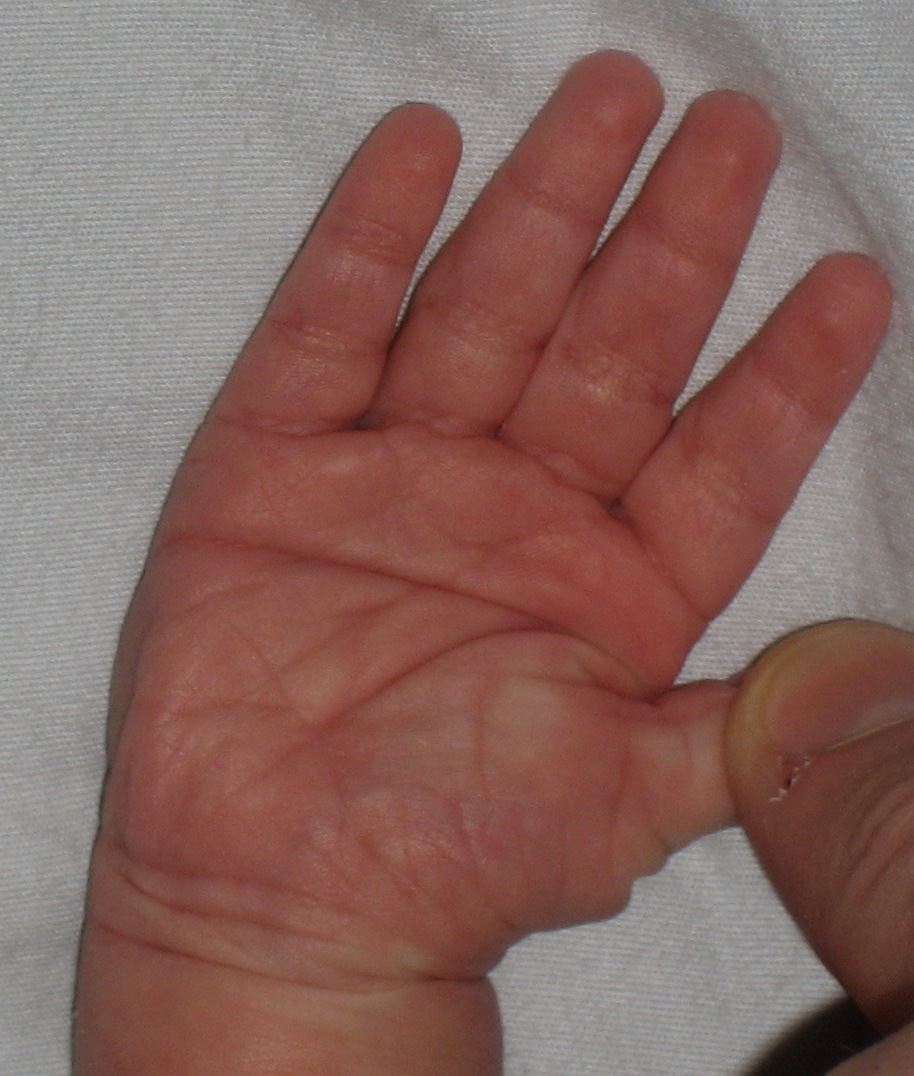
- Single transverse palmar crease on an infant's hand
- Specialty: Medical genetics

In humans, a single transverse palmar crease is a single crease that extends across the palm of the hand, formed by the fusion of the two palmar creases. Although it is found more frequently in persons with several abnormal medical conditions, it is not predictive of any of these conditions since it is also found in persons with no abnormal medical conditions.

This crease is estimated to occur in 1.5-3% of the general population, although it is more common in East Asian and Native American populations.

== Former name ==
Because it resembles the usual condition of non-human simians, it was, in the past, called the simian crease or simian line. These terms have widely fallen out of favor due to their pejorative connotation.

== Medical significance ==
This crease is found in 45% of people with Down syndrome.

The presence of a single transverse palmar has been associated with several abnormal medical conditions—that is, it is found at a higher than 1.5% frequency, but in all of these conditions, many do not have this crease. Examples of conditions with such an association are fetal alcohol syndrome and the genetic chromosomal abnormalities, such as Down syndrome (chromosome 21), cri du chat syndrome (chromosome 5), Klinefelter syndrome, Wolf–Hirschhorn syndrome, Noonan syndrome (chromosome 12), Patau syndrome (chromosome 13), IDIC 15/Dup15q (chromosome 15), Edward's syndrome (chromosome 18), and Aarskog–Scott syndrome (X-linked recessive), or autosomal recessive disorder, such as leukocyte adhesion deficiency-2 (LAD2). A unilateral single palmar crease was also reported in a case of chromosome 9 mutation causing nevoid basal cell carcinoma syndrome and Robinow syndrome. It is also sometimes found on the hands of the affected side of patients with Poland syndrome and craniosynostosis.

A 1971 study refutes the hypothesis that the phenomenon is caused by fetal hand movement: the appearance of the crease occurs around the second month of gestation before the digital movement phase in the womb begins.

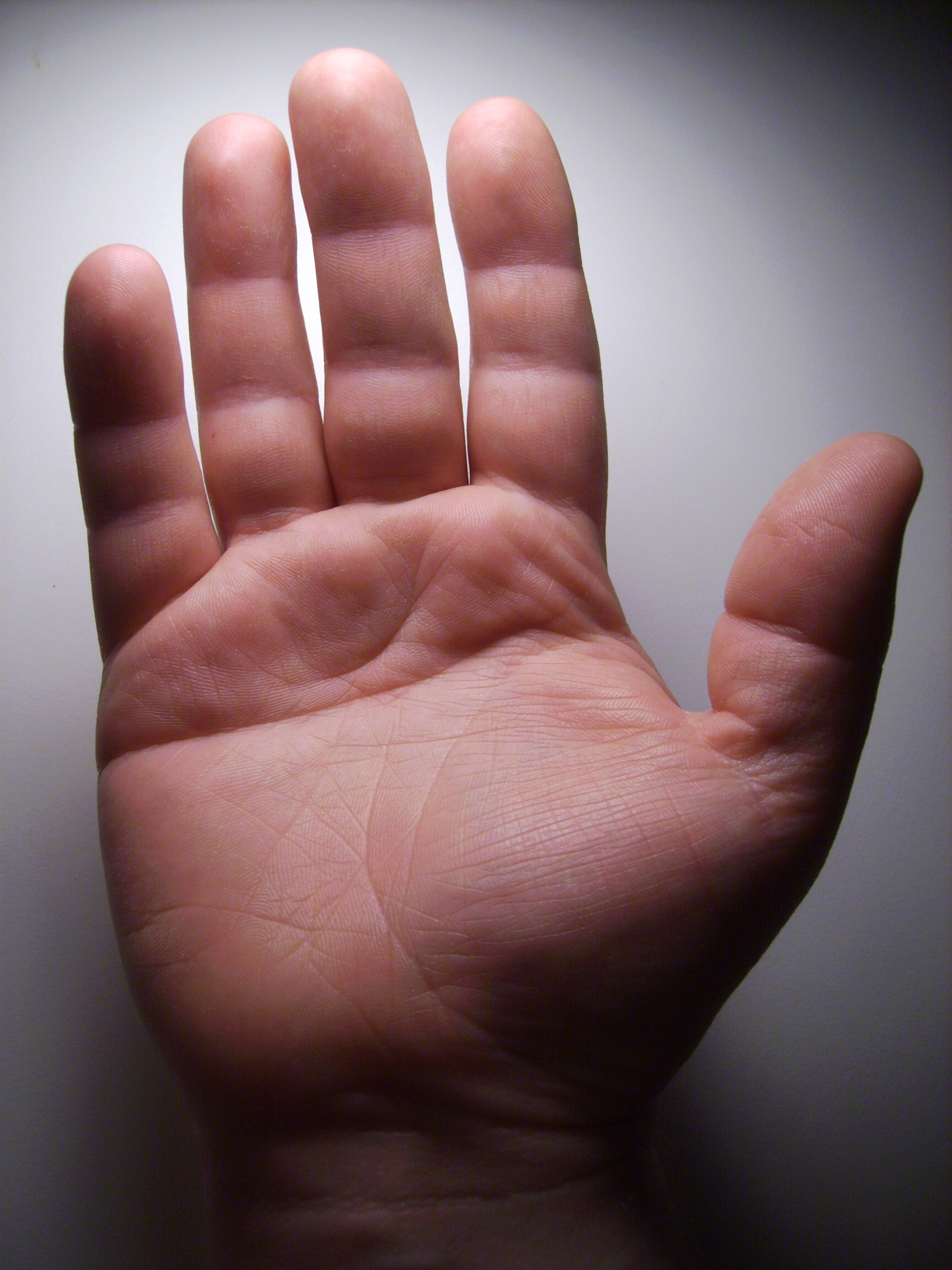
Single transverse palmar crease in an adult

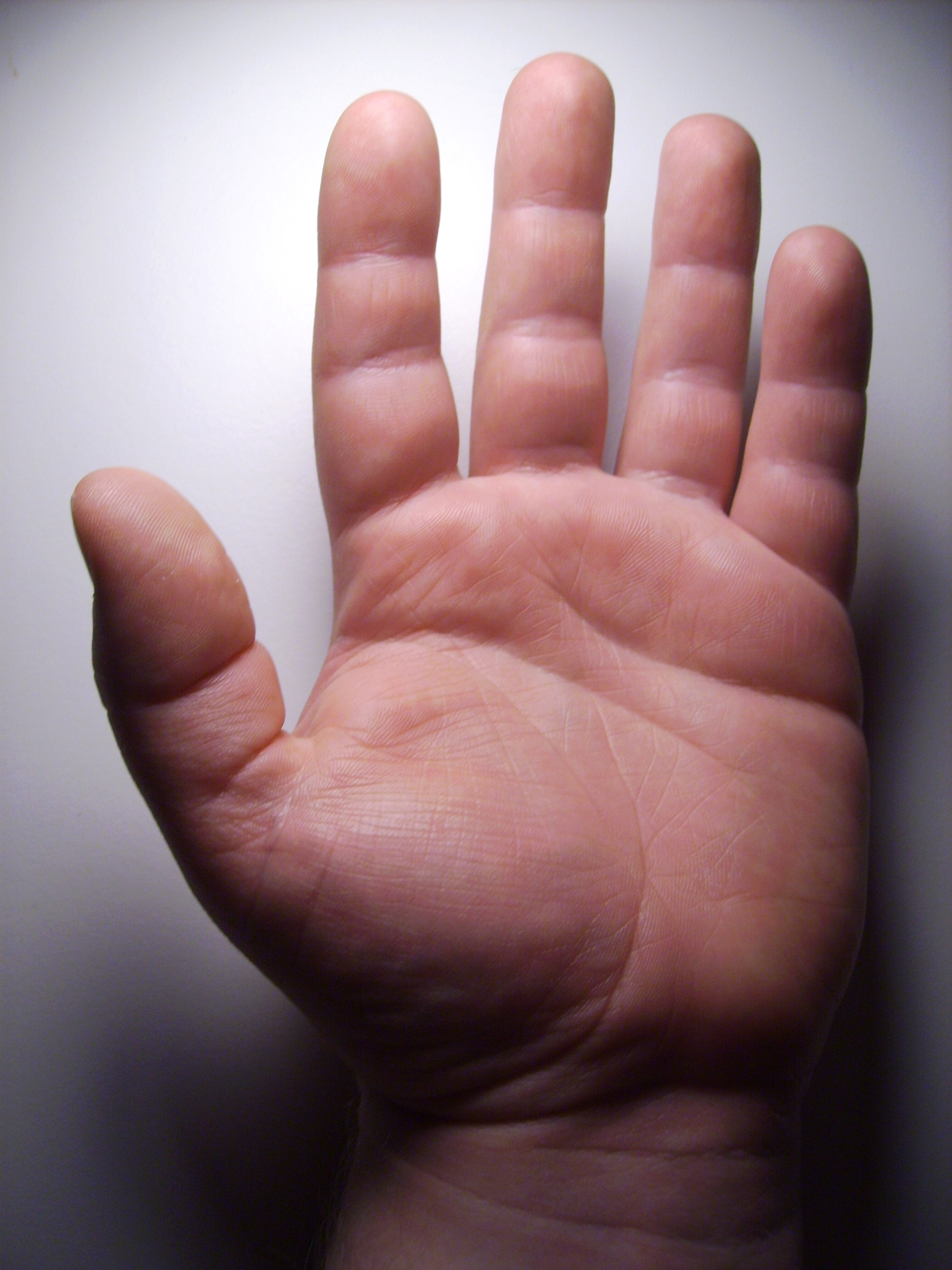
More common palmar creases in adults

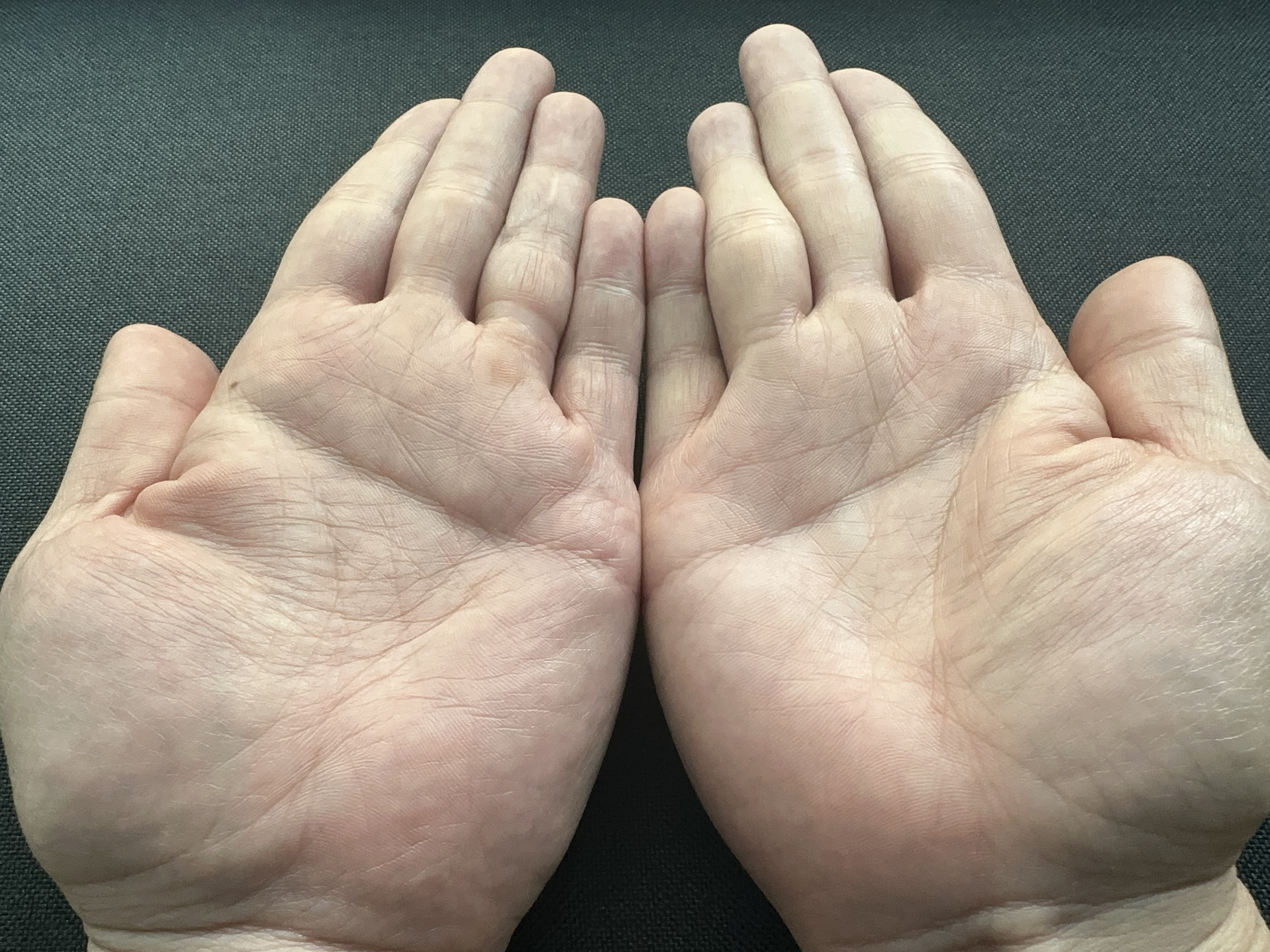
Bilateral single transverse palmar crease. The single transverse palmar crease is present on both hands of the individual.

== See also ==
- Dermatoglyphics
