= John Basmajian =

Canadian academic and scientist (1921-2008)

- Born: June 21, 1921; Istanbul
- Died: March 18, 2008 (aged 86)
- Occupations: Anatomist, Medical Doctor
- Awards: Order of Canada; Order of Ontario

John V. Basmajian, OC OOnt (June 21, 1921 – March 18, 2008) was a Canadian medical doctor and anatomist. He was known for his work in rehabilitation science, specifically in the area of electromyography and biofeedback.

Born in Istanbul of Armenian parents, he moved to Canada in 1923. The family settled in Brantford, Ontario. During World War II, he served in the Royal Canadian Army Medical Corps with the rank of captain. After the war, he received his M.D. in 1945 from the University of Toronto.

== Personal life ==
In 1949, he accepted a position as a lecturer in anatomy at the University of Toronto. He was appointed an assistant professor in 1951, an associate professor in 1951, and a full professor in 1956. In 1957, he took the position of professor and head of anatomy at Queen's University where he would remain until 1969. While residing in Kingston, Ontario he was chairman of the Kingston Board of Education and was involved in the founding of St. Lawrence College. From 1969 to 1977, he was director of neurophysiology at the Georgia Mental Health Institute in Atlanta. He also was a professor of anatomy, physical medicine, and psychiatry at Emory University. Returning to Canada, he was a professor of medicine at McMaster University from 1977 until 1986, when he was appointed emeritus professor of medicine and anatomy. He was president of the North American Society of Anatomists for one term. He also served as the 58th president of the American Association of Anatomists from 1985 to 1986. While at McMaster University he also served as the director of Chedoke Centre for Rehabilitation Medicine.

Basmajian was a very early pioneer in the field of biofeedback, performing some of the earliest studies, using fine-wire EMG (Electromyographic) instrumentation to demonstrate that subjects could voluntarily control muscles, even at the single motor unit level, which is controlled by a single neuron in the spinal cord. He later authored a book on biofeedback, which, for several decades, was the definitive text on the subject.

In 1991, he was awarded the Order of Ontario. In 1994, he was made an Officer of the Order of Canada for his "pioneering work in electromyography, which had a significant impact on the development of biofeedback techniques".

John Basmajian died on the morning of March 18, 2008. He was survived by his wife Dora and his three children Haig, Nancy and Sally, their spouses Lynn, Mark and Kevin, and his grandchildren, Mathew, Colin, Jocelyn and Peter.

Today, with the advent of computers, the biofeedback techniques he pioneered are being applied to a wide variety of interactive programs designed to help individuals with neurological disorders.

== Works ==
Basmajian was an important in the world of health care research and clinical interventions. He founded what was formerly known as EMG Biofeedback which then became the Biofeedback Society of America and was elected president of many societies like the Society of Electromyographic Kinesiology (1968-1972) or the American Association of Anatomists (1986) and his books were printed widely, exceeding a million copies, overall, in many languages. He was also an inventor of medical equipment but refused compensation for all of these.

For most of his career he was an in-demand keynote speaker and lecturer as the guest of universities, governments and medical societies all over the world. When earthquakes struck in his native Armenia, he volunteered to teach and work with the doctors of brain injury victims.
