= Escala scharrerae =

Scientific classification
- Kingdom: Animalia
- Phylum: Arthropoda
- Clade: Pancrustacea
- Class: Insecta
- Order: Blattodea
- Family: Ectobiidae
- Genus: Escala
- Species: E. scharrerae

Binomial name
- Escala scharrerae Roth, 1991

Species of cockroach

Escala scharrerae is a species of cockroach found in Australia.
