= Robert Russell Bensley =

Canadian physiologist and medical researcher

Robert Russell Bensley (November 13, 1867 – June 11, 1956) was a Canadian physiologist and medical researcher. He was among the first to recognized the secretory function of the Islets of Langerhans. He also developed techniques for the separation of mitochondria by centrifugation.

Bensley was born in Hamilton, Ontario to a family of English and Irish origins. He was educated at the Collegiate Institution before going to the University of Toronto. In the third year of his studies, he received a gun injury while out hunting and avoided death from bleeding by tying a tourniquet. A leg below his knee however had to be amputated. Gangrene led to a second amputation and he was given opium and expected not to survive. He regained consciousness and after some days stopped opium to avoid becoming dependent and survived. During his recovery, he read extensively and his father provided him with a microscope. In 1888 he returned to study and excelled in chemistry and languages. He taught histology and received his medical degree in 1892. He married Carriella May and began to teach at the University of Toronto and worked there for ten years. In 1901 he joined the University of Chicago as an assistant professor in anatomy and became an American citizen in 1916. He served as the 13th president of the Association of American Anatomists from 1917 to 1920. He studied the islets of Langerhans, the Golgi apparatus, the pancreas of the guinea pig, secretory granules in the thyroid and various other papers on histology. When Frederick Banting received a Nobel Prize, he told Bensley at a dinner in Toronto that "it was your Harvey Lecture on the pancreas that gave me the courage to go ahead with my experiments when all others told me I would fail." On June 7, 1952, the American Diabetes Association awarded Bensley with the Banting Medal.
