= Neurosecretion =

Storage, synthesis, and release of hormones from neurons

Neurosecretion is the release of extracellular vesicles and particles from neurons, astrocytes, microglial and other cells of the central nervous system. These neurohormones, produced by neurosecretory cells, are normally secreted from nerve cells in the brain that then circulate into the blood. These neurohormones are similar to nonneural endocrine cells and glands in that they also regulate both endocrine and nonendocrine cells. Neurosecretion cells synthesize and package their product in vesicles and exocytose them at axon endings just as normal neurons do, but release their product farther from their target than normal neurons (which release their neurotransmitters short distances at synapses), typically releasing their neurohormones into the circulatory system to reach their distant targets.

== Discovery ==
In 1928, Ernst Scharrer hypothesized that neurosecretory neurons in the hypothalamus of teleost fish, Phoxinus laevis, had secretory activity similar to that of endocrine gland cells. As more became known about neurosecretory cells, the difference between the actions of nerve communication and endocrine hormone release become less clear. Like the average neuron, these cells conduct electrical impulses along the axon but unlike these neurons, neurosecretion produces neurohormones that are released into the body’s circulation. Combining the properties of the nervous and endocrine, these cells have the capacity to affect nerves through chemical messengers. Neurosecretion is a broad area of study and must be further observed to be better understood.

== Insects ==
Insects play a large role in what is known about neurosecretion. In simpler organisms neurosecretion mechanisms regulate the heart, the process of metamorphosis, and directly influences the development of the gonadal function. In more advanced organisms the gonadal function is manipulated by the intermediary endocrine processes. Axons from neurosecretory cells trace to corpora cardiaca and corpora allata and produce and secrete a brain hormone which insect physiologists suspect is bound to a large carrier protein. Although the function is unknown, there are a multitude of these cells found in the ventral ganglia of the nerve cord. Neurosecretory cells, found in clusters in the medial and lateral parts of the brain, control corpora allata activity by producing juvenile hormone during the larval or nymphal instars, the phase between periods of molting in insects.

The production of this hormone inhibits the insect during the conversion to maturity and reactivating once the fully-grown adult is prepared for reproduction. The 3rd International Symposium on Neurosecretion at the University of Bristol discussed the intracellular structure of the neurosecretory cells and the migration path to the target organs or vascular fluid areas by neurosecretory granules. More is being discovered on the identification of granules in hormones and the linking of their development with the organism’s physiologic state. Neurosecretion in Tasar Silkworm, Antheraea mylitta Drury was investigated by Tripathi, P N et al.,(1997)and they suggested the presence of multilobed corpora allata in this lepidopteran insect.
