= American Association for Anatomy =

Professional organization advancing anatomical science, education, and research

- Abbreviation: AAA
- Pronunciation: /əˈmɛrɪkən əˌsoʊsiˈeɪʃən fɔːr əˈnætəmi/
- Predecessor: Association of American Anatomists
- Founded: September 17, 1888; 138 years ago
- Founder: Joseph Mellick Leidy
- Founded at: Washington D.C.
- Type: Nonprofit Scientific Organization
- Tax ID no.: 23-6239047
- Legal status: 501(c)(3) organization
- Purpose: Advancement of anatomical science, research, and education
- Headquarters: Rockville, Maryland, United States
- Region served: Worldwide
- Members: 2,552 (2024)
- President: Anne Burrows, PhD
- President-Elect: Ralph Marcucio, PhD
- Past President: Martine Dunnwald, PharmD, PhD, FAAA
- Secretary/Treasurer: Raj Ettarh, PhD
- Board of directors: Four (4) Officers; Ten (10) Non-Officers; One (1) Non-Voting Ex-Officio Director
- Main organ: Board of Directors
- Publication: Anatomical Sciences Education; Developmental Dynamics; The Anatomical Record
- Affiliations: Federation of American Societies for Experimental Biology (FASEB); International Federation of Associations of Anatomists (IFAA); Association of American Medical Colleges (AAMC) Council of Faculty and Academic Societies (CFAS); Society for Craniofacial Genetics Developmental Biology (SCGDB)
- Revenue: $3,730,489 (2024)
- Expenses: $2,972,422 (2024)
- Staff: 9 (2023)
- Volunteers: 110 (2023)
- Awards: Henry Gray Distinguished Educator Award; Henry Gray Scientific Achievement Award; Basmajian Award; A.J. Ladman Exemplary Service Award; Fellow of the American Association for Anatomy (FAAA)
- Website: anatomy.org

The American Association for Anatomy (AAA) is an international scientific society of biomedical researchers and educators committed to advancing anatomical science through research, education, and professional development. Headquartered in Rockville, Maryland, the association was established in 1888 in Washington, D.C., as the Association of American Anatomists to promote the "advancement of anatomical science". It was renamed in 1908 as the American Association of Anatomists, before adopting its current name in 2019 to reflect the evolving scope of anatomical science and its interdisciplinary reach.

In addition to teaching, AAA members conduct research in a broad range of fields, including imaging, cell biology, genetics, molecular development, endocrinology, histology, neuroscience, forensics, microscopy, and physical anthropology.

== History ==
The Association of American Anatomists was founded in 1888 with the primary objective of advancing the study and teaching of anatomy in the United States. The AAA was organized during a meeting at Georgetown University the evening of September 17, 1888. These founding officers were elected:

- President, Dr. Joseph Leidy, of Philadelphia
- Vice Presidents, Dr. Frank Baker of Washington and Dr. F. D. Weisse of New York
- Secretary and Treasurer, Dr. A. H. P. Leuf, of Philadelphia
- Executive Committee Member, Dr. Harrison Allen, of Philadelphia
- Executive Committee Member, Dr. Burt G. Wilder, of Ithaca
- Executive Committee Member, Dr. A. C. Bernays, of St. Louis

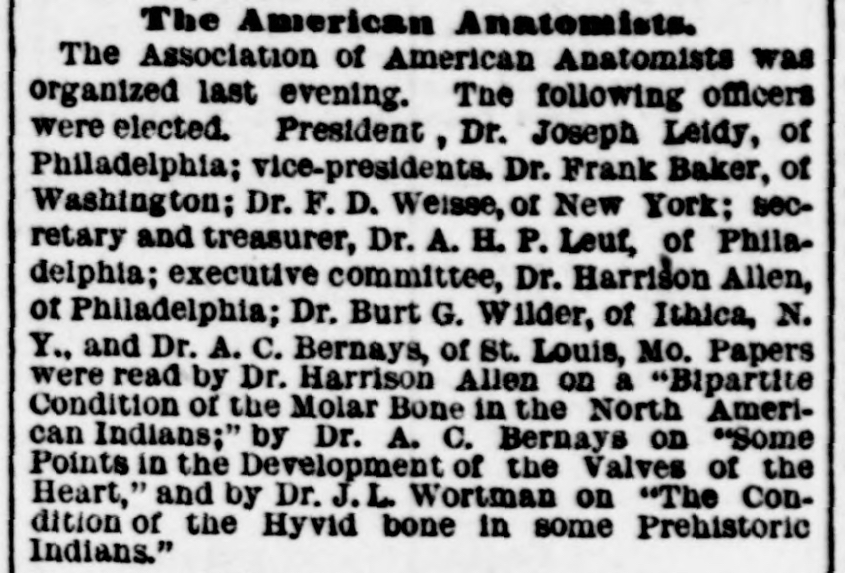
Scan of 1888 Newspaper Announcement of the Association of American Anatomists' Founding Meeting.

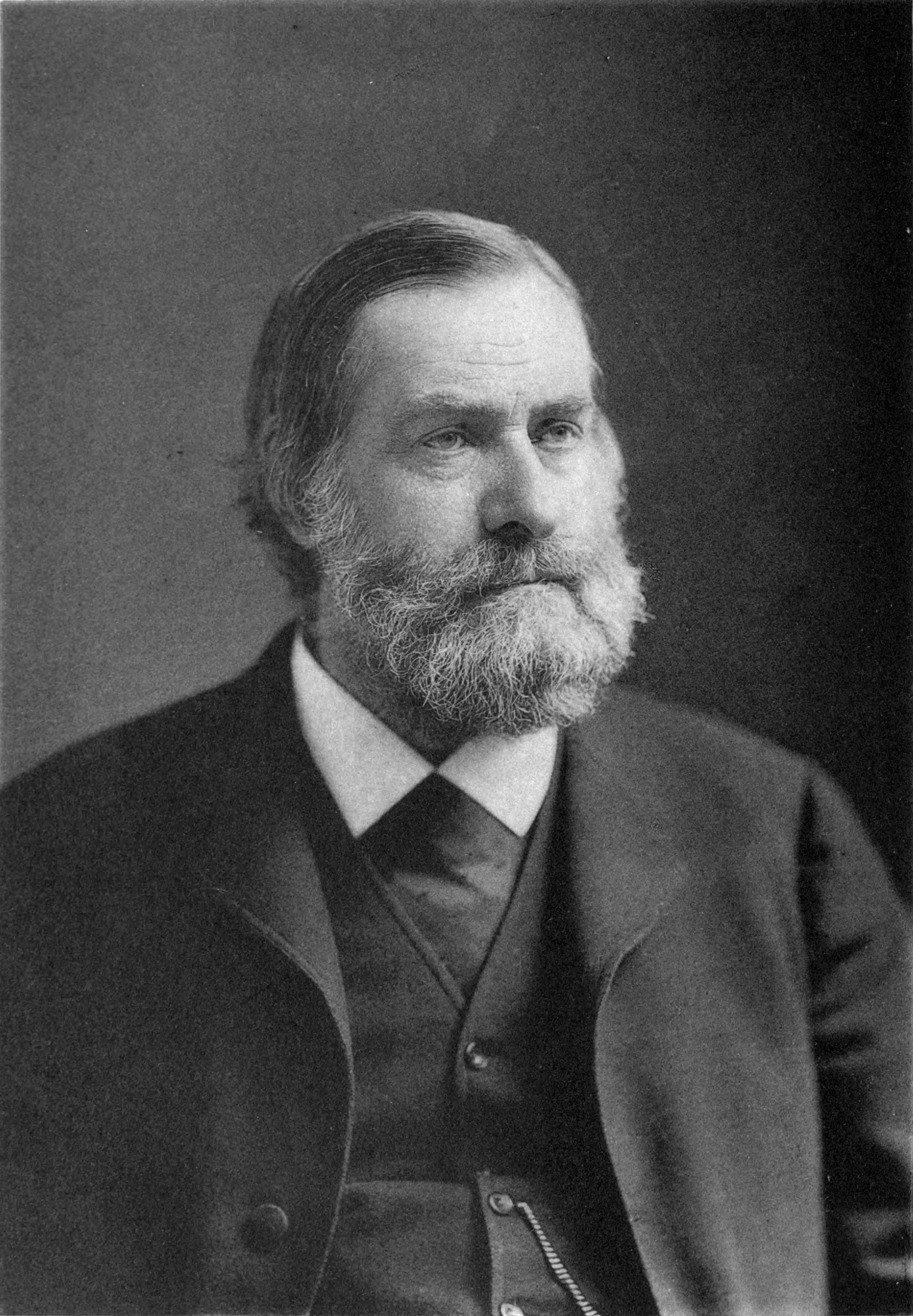
Photo of Joseph Leidy, first President of the AAA.

Initially, the organization served as a professional forum for anatomists to exchange research findings and foster scientific collaboration in an era when anatomical science was rapidly evolving alongside advances in medicine and biology.

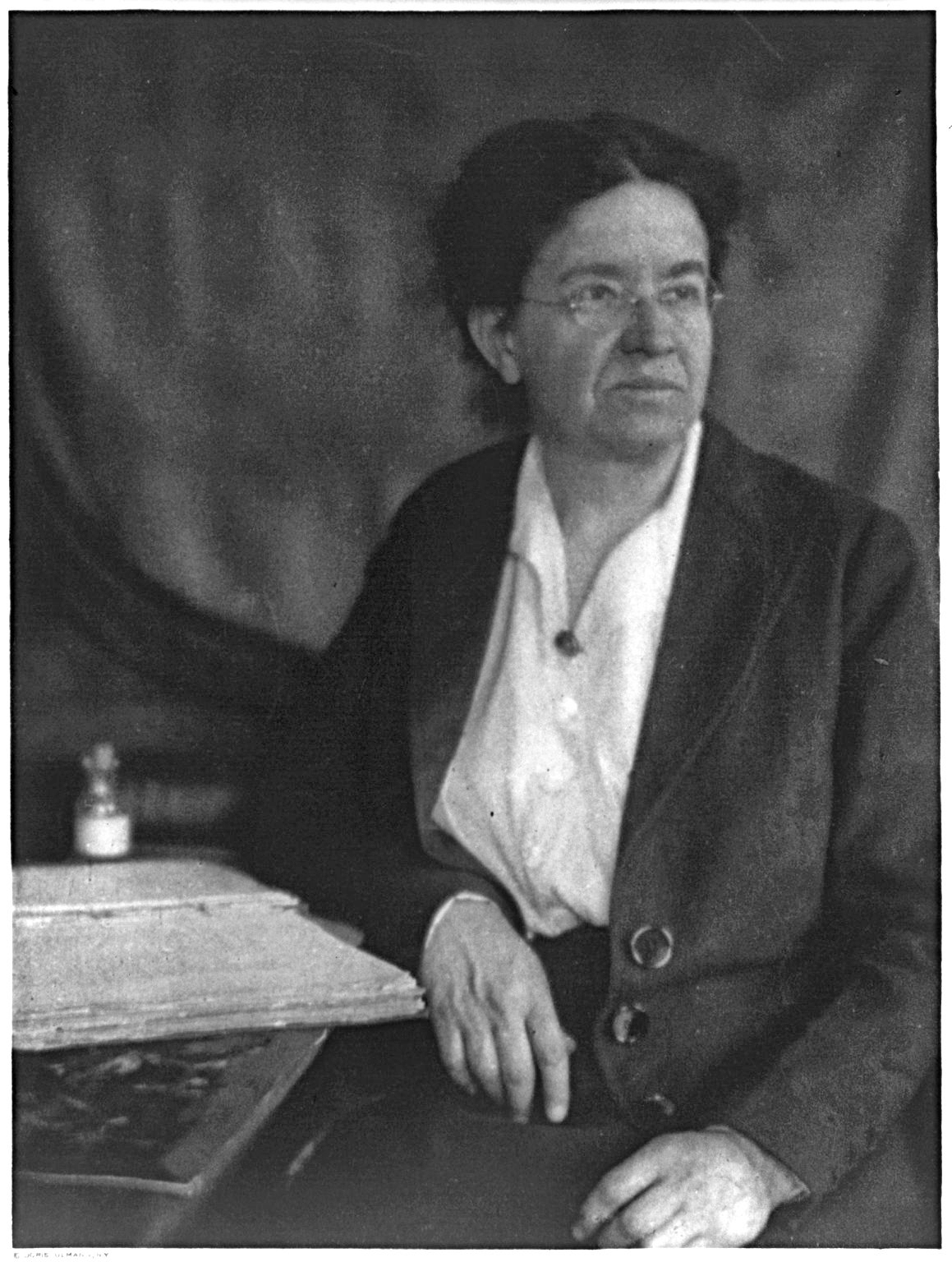
Florence R. Sabin, first woman President of the AAA.

In 1901, the first issue of the Proceedings of the American Association of Anatomists was published in the American Journal of Anatomy.

In 1908, Florence R. Sabin became the first woman officer. She was subsequently elected as the first female President in 1924.

In 1917, membership reached over 300 members.

In 1937, the AAA hosted its first meeting outside of the United States, in Toronto, Canada.

In 1986, membership surpassed 5,000.

In 1996, the AAA annual meeting was held for the first time as part of the larger Experimental Biology conference.

In 2019, the association officially changed its name from the American Association of Anatomists to the American Association for Anatomy. This change was made to better represent the diversity of scientific fields within its membership and to reflect the broader scope of anatomical sciences promoted by the association in the 21st century.

The association publishes several peer-reviewed journals, including The Anatomical Record, Anatomical Sciences Education, and Developmental Dynamics. Additionally, the association organizes scientific meetings and educational symposia, funding research and travel grants, and promoting equity and inclusion within the anatomical sciences. The AAA has supported the development of subspecialty organizations such as the American Association of Clinical Anatomists (AACA).

List of presidents of the American Association of Anatomists, including their terms of service and notable contributions
| No. | Name | Term start | Term end | Notable contributions |
|---|---|---|---|---|
| 1 | Joseph Leidy | 1888 | 1889 | Founding president; established initial organizational goals. |
| 2 | Harrison Allen | 1891 | 1894 | |
| 3 | Thomas Dwight | 1894 | 1895 | |
| 4 | Frank Baker | 1895 | 1897 | |
| 5 | Burt Green Wilder | 1898 | 1899 | |
| 6 | George S. Huntington | 1899 | 1903 | Editorial board of the American Journal of Anatomy, and the Anatomical Record |
| 7 | Charles S. Minot | 1903 | 1905 | Editorial board of the American Journal of Anatomy, and the Anatomical Record |
| 8 | Franklin P. Mall | 1905 | 1908 | Establishment of the American Journal of Anatomy, and the Anatomical Record. |
| 9 | James P. McMurrich | 1908 | 1909 | Editorial board of the American Journal of Anatomy |
| 10 | George A. Piersol | 1909 | 1911 | Editorial board of the American Journal of Anatomy |
| 11 | Ross G. Harrison | 1911 | 1913 | |
| 12 | Gotthelf C. Huber | 1913 | 1915 | Editorial board of the American Journal of Anatomy, and the Anatomical Record |
| 13 | Henry H. Donaldson | 1915 | 1917 | Editorial board of the American Journal of Anatomy |
| 14 | Robert R. Bensley | 1917 | 1920 | |
| 15 | C. F. W. McLure | 1920 | 1921 | |
| 16 | Clarence M. Jackson | 1921 | 1924 | |
| 17 | Florence R. Sabin | 1924 | 1926 | |
| 18 | George L. Streeter | 1926 | 1928 | |
| 19 | Charles R. Stockard | 1928 | 1930 | |
| 20 | Herbert M. Evans | 1930 | 1932 | |
| 21 | George E. Coghill | 1932 | 1934 | |
| 22 | Warren Harmon Lewis | 1934 | 1936 | |
| 23 | Frederic T. Lewis | 1936 | 1938 | |
| 24 | S. Walter Ranson | 1938 | 1940 | |
| 25 | Philip E. Smith | 1940 | 1942 | |
| 26 | Edgar Allen | 1942 | 1943 | |
| 27 | J. Parsons Schaeffer* | 1943 | 1946 | |
| 28 | George W. Corner | 1946 | 1948 | |
| 29 | George W. Bartelmez | 1948 | 1950 | |
| 30 | Sam L. Clark | 1950 | 1952 | |
| 31 | Leslie B. Arey | 1952 | 1954 | |
| 32 | Samuel R. Detwiler | 1954 | 1956 | |
| 33 | Edward A. Boyden | 1956 | 1957 | |
| 34 | Barry J. Anson | 1957 | 1958 | |
| 35 | Davenport Hooker | 1958 | 1959 | |
| 36 | Normand Louis Hoerr** | 1959 | 1960 | |
| 37 | H. Stanley Bennett** | 1959 | 1960 | |
| 38 | Edward W. Dempsey | 1960 | 1961 | |
| 39 | Harold Cummins | 1961 | 1962 | |
| 40 | Charles P. Leblond | 1962 | 1963 | |
| 41 | Horace W. Magoun | 1963 | 1964 | |
| 42 | Charles Mayo Goss | 1964 | 1965 | |
| 43 | Don Wayne Fawcett | 1965 | 1966 | |
| 44 | Donald Duncan | 1966 | 1967 | |
| 45 | Karl E. Mason | 1967 | 1968 | |
| 46 | Richard J. Blandau | 1968 | 1969 | |
| 47 | Roland H. Alden | 1969 | 1970 | |
| 48 | Raymond Carl Truex | 1970 | 1971 | |
| 49 | David Bodian | 1971 | 1972 | |
| 50 | William U. Gardner | 1972 | 1973 | |
| 51 | John W. Everett | 1973 | 1974 | |
| 52 | Russel T. Woodburne | 1974 | 1975 | |
| 53 | John C. Finerty | 1975 | 1976 | |
| 54 | Carmine D. Clemente | 1976 | 1977 | |
| 55 | Newton B. Everett | 1977 | 1978 | |
| 56 | Berta V. Scharrer | 1978 | 1979 | |
| 57 | Daniel C. Pease | 1979 | 1980 | |
| 58 | Sanford L. Palay | 1980 | 1981 | |
| 59 | Elizabeth D. Hay | 1981 | 1982 | |
| 60 | John E. Pauly | 1982 | 1983 | Edited book on history and membership of AAA |
| 61 | Allen C. Enders | 1983 | 1984 | |
| 62 | A. Kent Christensen | 1984 | 1985 | |
| 63 | John V. Basmajian | 1985 | 1986 | |
| 64 | Douglas E. Kelly | 1986 | 1987 | |
| 65 | Henry J. Ralston, III | 1987 | 1988 | |
| 66 | Roger R. Markwald | 1988 | 1989 | |
| 67 | Jerome Sutin | 1989 | 1990 | |
| 68 | Karen R. Hitchcock | 1990 | 1991 | |
| 69 | Wiliam P. Jollie | 1991 | 1992 | |
| 70 | Alan Peters | 1992 | 1993 | |
| 71 | Donald A. Fischman | 1993 | 1994 | |
| 72 | Charles E. Slonecker | 1994 | 1995 | |
| 73 | Michael D. Gershon | 1995 | 1996 | |
| 74 | Gary C. Schoenwolf | 1996 | 1997 | |
| 75 | Bruce M. Carlson | 1997 | 1999 | |
| 76 | Robert D. Yates | 1999 | 2001 | |
| 77 | John F. Fallon | 2001 | 2003 | |
| 78 | Robert S. McCuskey | 2003 | 2005 | |
| 79 | Kathy Svoboda | 2005 | 2007 | |
| 80 | David Burr | 2007 | 2009 | |
| 81 | Kathryn Jones | 2009 | 2011 | |
| 82 | Jeffrey T. Laitman | 2011 | 2013 | |
| 83 | Lynn Opperman | 2013 | 2015 | |
| 84 | Kimberly Topp | 2015 | 2017 | |
| 85 | Phil Brauer | 2017 | 2019 | Lead name change to American Association for Anatomy |
| 86 | Rick Sumner | 2019 | 2021 | |
| 87 | Valerie DeLeon | 2021 | 2023 | |
| 88 | Martine Dunnwald | 2023 | 2025 | |
| 89 | Anne Burrows | 2025 | 2027 | |
| 90 | Ralph Marcucio | 2027 | 2029 | |

== Governance and structure ==
The American Association for Anatomy (AAA) operates as a non-profit organization incorporated in the United States, with its headquarters located in Rockville, Maryland. The association is governed in accordance with its official bylaws, which define its structure, operational procedures, and the responsibilities of its leadership bodies.

The principal governing body of the AAA is its Board of Directors, which is responsible for establishing strategic direction and overseeing the organization's overall operations and fiduciary responsibilities. The Board includes elected officers such as the President, President-Elect, and Past President, as well as other members-at-large who represent various sectors of the anatomical sciences community. Supporting the Board's functions is the Executive Committee, which includes the key officers and provides leadership on administrative and policy matters between full Board meetings.

== Publications ==
The American Association for Anatomy (AAA) publishes three major peer-reviewed journals: Anatomical Sciences Education, The Anatomical Record, and Developmental Dynamics. These journals are published in partnership with Wiley.

Anatomical Sciences Education, founded in 2008, is an international journal dedicated to the promotion of excellence in teaching and learning in the anatomical sciences. It publishes original research, reviews, and commentaries on educational methods, curriculum development, assessment strategies, and professional development for educators. It operates under a hybrid open access model, offering authors the option to make their articles freely available and it had a Journal Impact Factor of 5.2 in 2023.

The Anatomical Record, founded in 1906, is one of the oldest continuously published journals in the field of anatomy. It focuses on experimental and comparative studies that explore structure-function relationships in cells, tissues, and organisms. The journal encompasses a wide range of topics, including evolutionary biology, functional morphology, and imaging. It had a Journal Impact Factor of 1.8 in 2023.

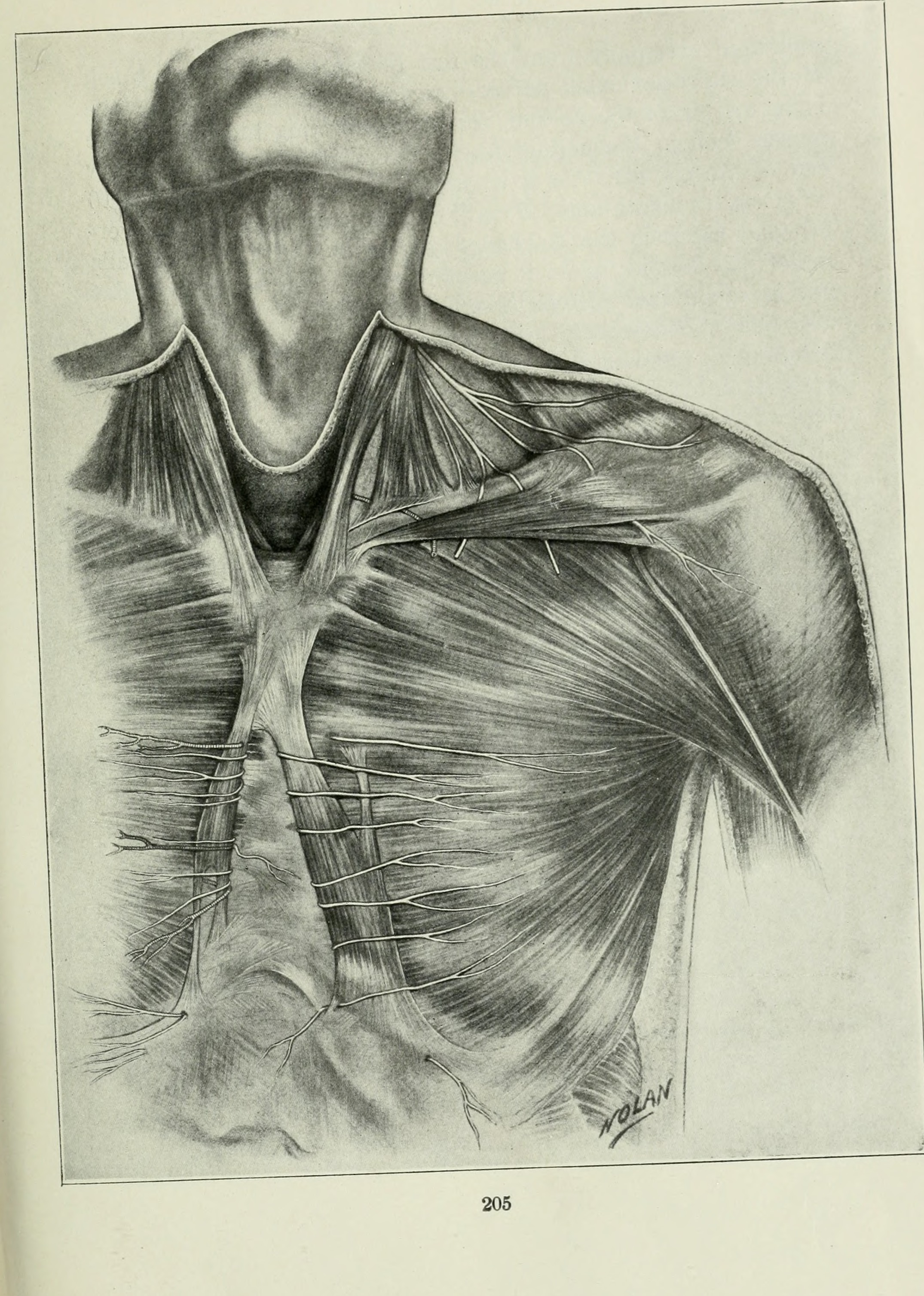
Page from a 1906 issue of The Anatomical Record.

Developmental Dynamics, originally launched as The Journal of Anatomy and Embryology in 1901, publishes research in developmental biology with a particular emphasis on molecular, cellular, and genetic mechanisms underlying embryonic and postnatal development. The journal also features work that intersects with regenerative medicine and stem cell biology. It provides authors the option for open access publishing and it had a Journal Impact Factor of 2 in 2023.

== Awards and recognition ==
The American Association for Anatomy (AAA) administers a wide-ranging awards and recognition program designed to honor excellence across all stages of anatomical science careers. The association recognizes contributions in research, education, mentoring, service, and efforts to promote diversity, equity, and inclusion within the field.

One of the most prestigious honors conferred by AAA is the title of Fellow of the American Association for Anatomy (FAAA). This designation is awarded to members who have demonstrated distinguished contributions to the anatomical sciences and outstanding service to the association. Fellowship recognizes sustained excellence in areas such as scientific research, education, leadership, and professional service.

== See also ==
- Anatomy
- Federation of American Societies for Experimental Biology (FASEB)
- Human anatomy
- Gross anatomy
- Medical education
- Histology
- Professional association
