= Developmental Dynamics =

- Discipline: Developmental biology
- Language: English
- Edited by: Paul A. Trainor

Publication details
- Former name(s): American Journal of Anatomy
- History: 1901–present
- Publisher: John Wiley & Sons
- Frequency: Monthly
- Open access: After 1 year
- Impact factor: 3.780 (2020)

Standard abbreviations
- ISO 4: Dev. Dyn.

Indexing
- CODEN: DEDYEI
- ISSN: 1058-8388 (print); 1097-0177 (web)
- LCCN: 92659082
- OCLC no.: 606067252

Links
- Journal homepage; Online access

Developmental Dynamics is a peer-reviewed scientific journal of developmental biology that was established in 1901 as the American Journal of Anatomy. It obtained its current name in 1992 and is one of three official journals of the American Association of Anatomists. The journal is published monthly by John Wiley & Sons.

According to the Journal Citation Reports, the journal has a 2020 impact factor of 3.780, ranking it 2nd out of 21 journals in the category "Anatomy & Morphology" and 14th out of 41 journals in the category "Developmental Biology".

== Abstracting and indexing ==
The journal is indexed and abstracted in:

- AgBiotech News & Information
- AgBiotechNet
- Animal Breeding Abstracts
- Biological Abstracts
- BIOSIS Previews
- CAB Abstracts
- CAB HEALTH
- CABDirect
- Cambridge Scientific Abstracts
- Chemical Abstracts Service
- Chemical Abstracts Service/SciFinder
- CSA Biological Sciences Database
- Current Contents/Life Sciences
- Dairy Science Abstracts
- Elsevier BIOBASE/Current Awareness in Biological Sciences
- Embase
- EMBiology
- FISHLIT
- Focus On: Veterinary Science & Medicine
- Global Health
- Helminthological Abstracts
- International Bibliographic Information on Dietary Supplements
- Index Medicus/MEDLINE
- Index Veterinarius
- MEDLINE
- Nematological Abstracts
- Neurosciences Abstracts
- Nutrition Abstracts & Reviews Series A: Human & Experimental
- Nutrition Abstracts & Reviews Series B: Livestock Feeds & Feeding
- Pig News & Information
- Plant Breeding Abstracts
- Plant Growth Regulator Abstracts
- Postharvest News & Information
- Poultry Abstracts
- Reference Update
- Review of Agricultural Entomology
- Review of Medical & Veterinary Entomology
- Science Citation Index
- Scopus
- Soils & Fertilizer Abstracts
- Veterinary Bulletin
- VINITI
- Web of Science
- Weed Abstracts
- Zoological Record
