= The Anatomical Record =

- Discipline: Anatomy
- Language: English
- Edited by: Heather F. Smith

Publication details
- History: 1906–present
- Publisher: John Wiley & Sons
- Frequency: Monthly
- Impact factor: 2.064 (2020)

Standard abbreviations
- ISO 4: Anat. Rec.

Indexing
- ISSN: 1932-8486 (print); 1932-8494 (web)
- LCCN: 2006215058
- OCLC no.: 70853202

Links
- Journal homepage; Online access; Online archive

The Anatomical Record is a peer-reviewed scientific journal covering anatomy. It was established by the American Association of Anatomists in 1906 and is published by John Wiley & Sons. According to the Journal Citation Reports, the journal has a 2020 impact factor of 2.064.

== See also ==
- List of biology journals
