= RSTS =

RSTS can refer to:

- RSTS/E, Resource Sharing Timesharing System Extended
- Range Safety and Telemetry System
- Rubinstein–Taybi syndrome
