= Joel Hirschhorn (geneticist) =

Scientist and medical doctor

- Citizenship: American
- Education: Stuyvesant High School; Harvard College; Harvard Medical School
- Known for: Research on the genetics of complex human traits
- Parent(s): Kurt and Rochelle Hirschhorn
- Awards: E. Mead Johnson Award from the Society for Pediatric Research (2011)
- Scientific career
- Fields: Human genetics
- Institutions: Boston Children's Hospital; Broad Institute; Harvard Medical School
- Thesis: Genetic and molecular analysis of histones and SNF/SWI proteins: Effects on chromatin structure and transcription in Saccharomyces cerevisiae (1995)
- Doctoral advisor: Fred Winston
- Other academic advisors: Eric S. Lander

Joel Naom Hirschhorn is an American human geneticist, pediatrician, and endocrinologist. He is known for his research on the genetics of complex human traits, such as height.

== Early life, family and education ==
Hirschhorn is the son of Kurt and Rochelle Hirschhorn, both human geneticists.

Joel attended Stuyvesant High School in New York City. He then attended Harvard College, where he received his A.B. in biochemistry before receiving his Ph.D. and M.D. from Harvard Medical School. He did his Ph.D. research on chromatin structure and transcription in yeast with Fred Winston. After receiving his Ph.D., he did his postdoc on genetic association studies at the Whitehead Institute's Center for Genome Research with Eric Lander.

== Career ==
He is an institute member of the Broad Institute, as well as the Concordia Professor of Pediatrics and Professor of Genetics at Boston Children’s Hospital and Harvard Medical School. He has had his own laboratory at Boston Children's Hospital since 2001. He became the Chief of the Division of Endocrinology at Boston Children's Hospital in 2018.

Additionally, he heads the GIANT consortium.

In 2006, Hirschhorn was elected to the American Society for Clinical Investigation. In 2011, he received the Society for Pediatric Research's E. Mead Johnson Award. In 2020, he was elected to the National Academy of Medicine.
