= 114th Electromagnetic Warfare Squadron =

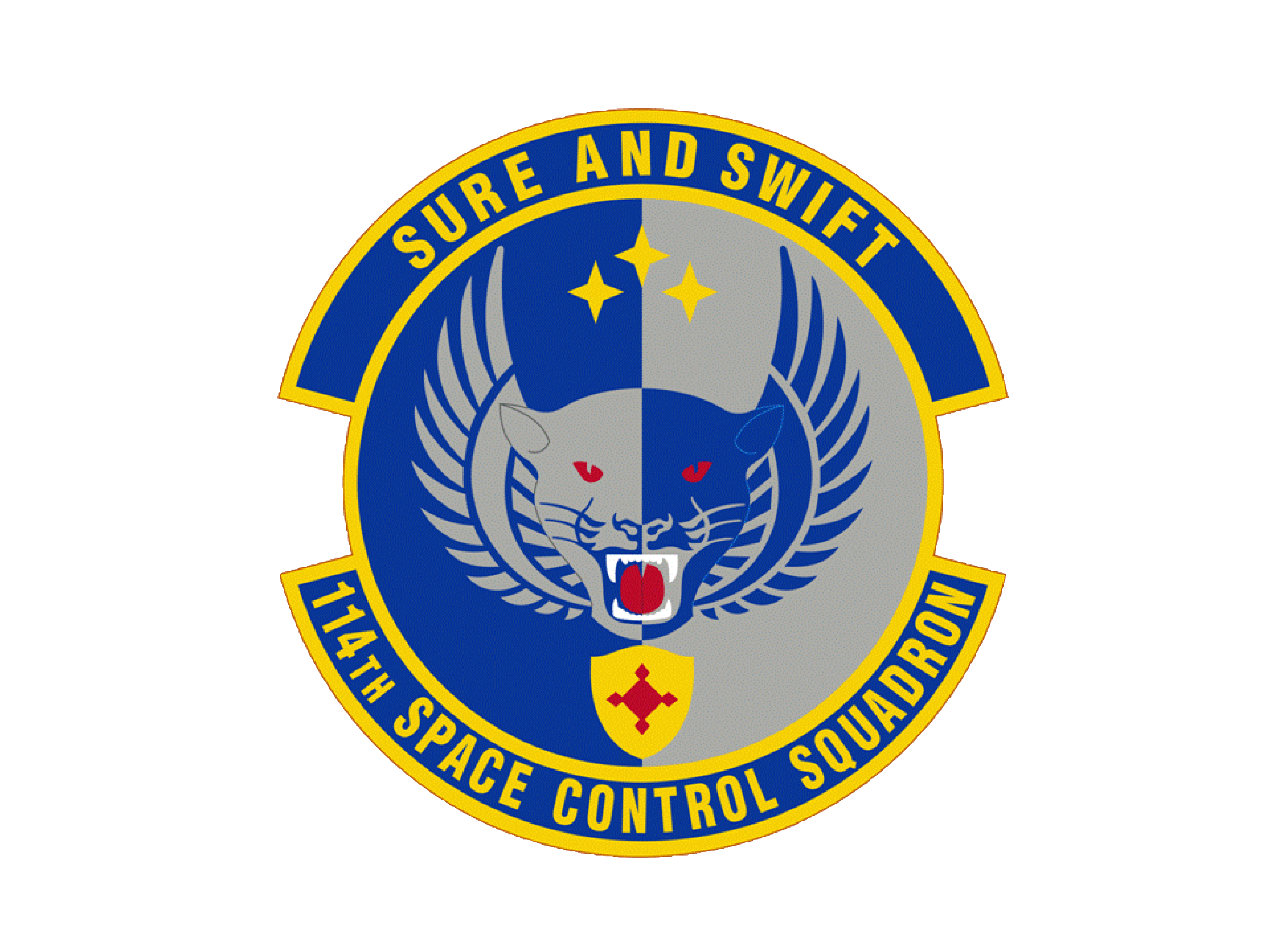
- 114th Space Control Squadron emblem
- Active: 1989–current.
- Country: United States
- Allegiance: Florida
- Branch: Air National Guard
- Type: Offensive and Defensive Space Control
- Part of: 125th Fighter Wing
- Garrison/HQ: Cape Canaveral Space Force Station, Florida
- Nicknames: Thundercats, Space Panthers
- Mottos: "Sure and Swift", "Silence Right Meow"

Commanders
- Current commander: Lt Col Anthony Surman

The United States Air Force's 114th Electromagnetic Warfare Squadron (EWS) is a Florida Air National Guard unit located at Cape Canaveral Space Force Station, Florida. It is operationally gained by the United States Space Force.

== Mission ==
The 114 EWS mission is two-fold:

First, to deliver offensive counterspace and space situational awareness, as appropriate, to rapidly achieve flexible and versatile effects in support of global and theater campaigns and to provide mission-ready citizen-Airmen and equipment to Combatant Commanders in support of operations worldwide.

Second, as an Air National Guard asset the 114 EWS is also available for state contingencies (hurricanes, floods, fires, domestic response, etc.) and is subject to activation by the Governor of Florida in times of emergency. Its primary mission, once activated, is to man the Emergency Support Function #5 (Information and Planning) at the State Emergency Operations Center in Tallahassee, FL which involves collecting, analyzing, processing and disseminating information for potential or actual disasters/emergencies in order for Federal Government agencies to provide humanitarian assistance to the affected hard-hit areas.

== History ==
The 114th Communications Squadron (114 CS) was Federally recognized on 15 May 1989. Originally conceived to provide manning for pre-positioned NATO satellite communications terminals in the event of war against the Soviet Union, the unit mission was labeled NABS, or NATO Air Base Satellite. At the time it was equipped with only one TSC-85B terminal for training and 35 members. There were only two career fields offered to traditional guard members, satellite communications and electrical power production. Patrick AFB was selected as its home location because the active duty Air Force's then-2nd Communications Group was also located at Patrick AFB and could provide training and mentorship. The level of highly technical industries located on the Space Coast and in the nearby Orlando/Central Florida area also factored to place the 114th in Cocoa Beach, Florida. As established, the 114 CS was operationally-gained for federal service by the Tactical Air Command (TAC).

The first commander of the 114 CS, Lieutenant Colonel Robert Chandler, took the lead from its inception until January 1991, driving the recruiting and organizational efforts. This was when the worldwide legacy began, with support of operations in Turkey and Saudi Arabia, including Operations Desert Shield and Desert Storm.

The next commander was Major (later Lieutenant Colonel and Colonel) David Barnhart. Major Barnhart led the 114th from January 1991 to September 1994. During Maj Barnhart's tenure, the team's experience grew exponentially: not only were operational missions conducted in Spain, Germany, Italy, Honduras, Saudi Arabia, Canada and Colombia, but now humanitarian efforts drew members to hurricane relief efforts in Jamaica and south Florida (i.e., Hurricane Andrew). Additionally, various stateside exercises, including Coronet Stroke and Combat Challenge, tested the fiber of the already mature unit. In the summerof 1992, as part of a USAF-wide reorganization of major commands, TAC was disestablished and the squadron's new operational gaining command became the Air Combat Command (ACC). The squadron was later redesignated as the 114th Combat Communications Squadron (114 CBCS) on 1 October 1992. In January 1994, the 114th received its first Air Force Outstanding Unit Award.

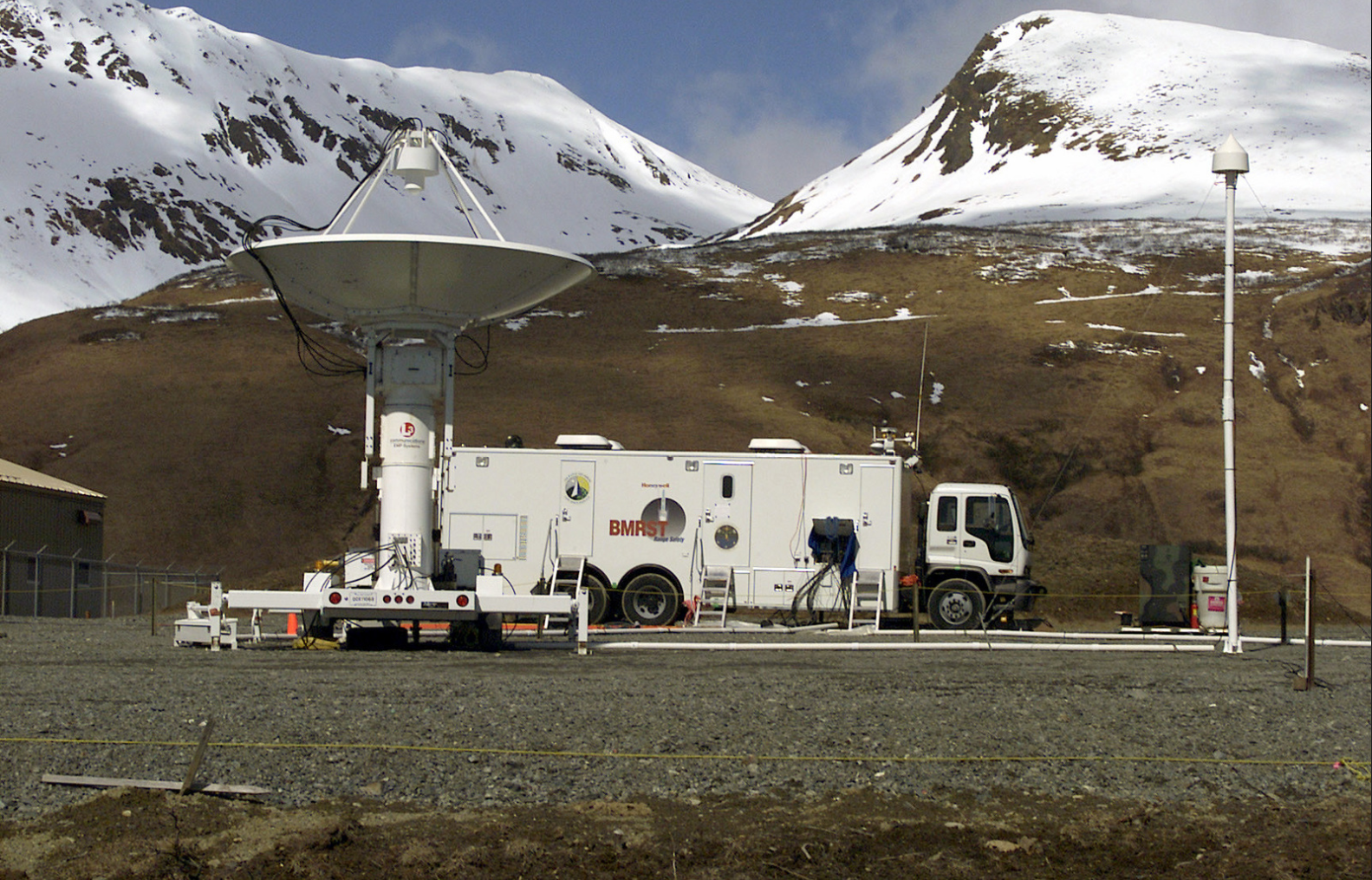
The BMRST system on station at the Kodiak Launch Complex, Kodiak, Alaska. Members of the 114 CBCS, Patrick AFB, Florida, deployed here for over a month in preparation for the launch of the Quick Reaction Launch Vehicle (QRLV) during Exercise NORTHERN EDGE.

Lieutenant Colonel Michele Agee assumed command in September 1994. She led the unit through further expansion with missions in Haiti, Panama, Egypt, Croatia, Morocco and Bosnia along with numerous events in Florida, New Mexico, Oklahoma and Utah. In 1995, the squadron began building up the 114th Range Flight to support 45th Space Wing (45 SW) launch operations. These members were co-located with the 45th Range Squadron (45 RANS) at Cape Canaveral Air Force Station.

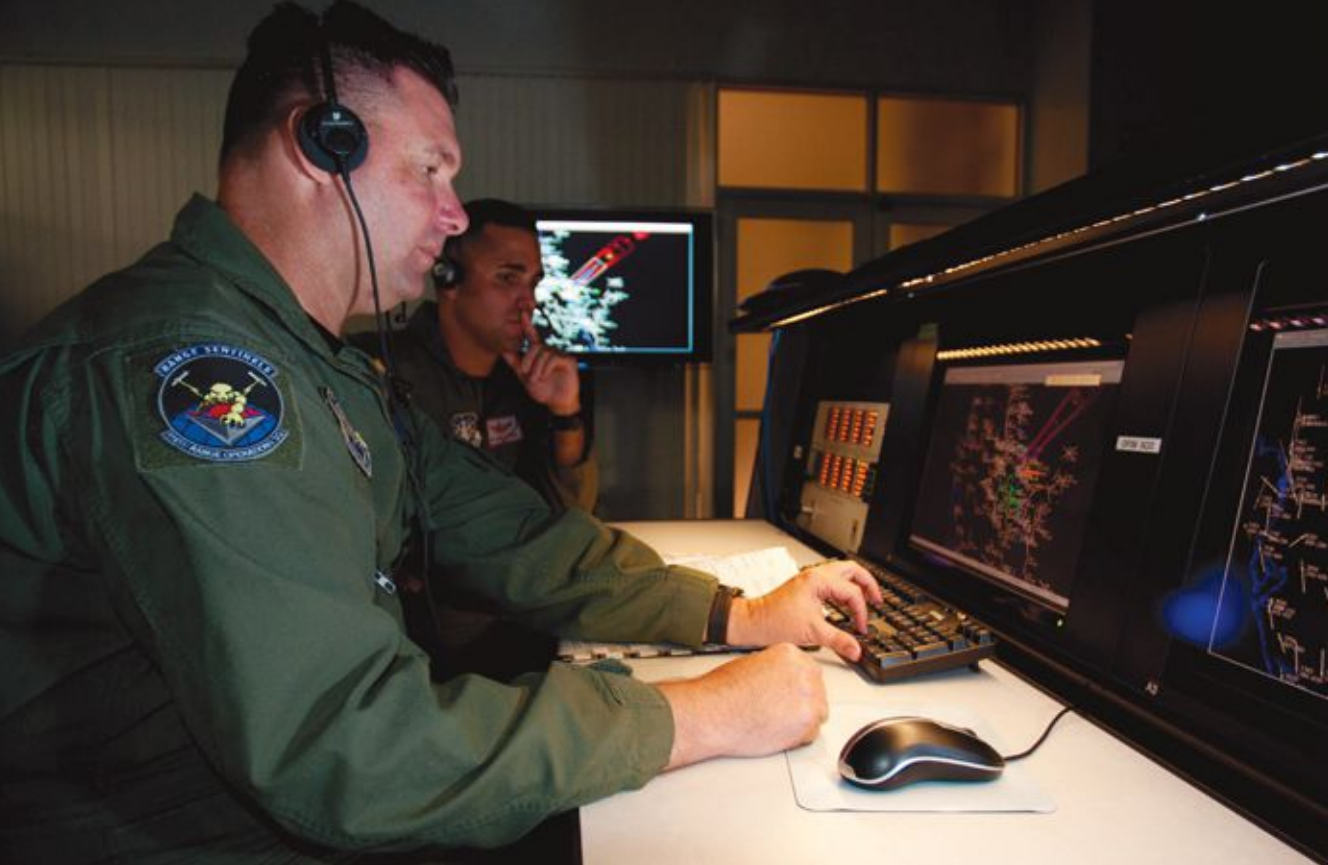
MSgt Greg Jones (left) and MSgt Dan Alonso, both of the 114th Range Operations Squadron, discuss launch safety for the final space shuttle mission.

In January 1998, Major Daniel Bates took command, with personnel already deployed to Bosnia and later to Italy. In 1999, a partnership with the Air Force Research Lab (AFRL) was established to develop the Ballistic Missile Range Safety Technology (BMRST) system and the 114 CBCS personnel were commissioned to provide support to the program. In January 2001, the 114 CBCS deployed to the Kodiak Launch Complex, Kodiak, Alaska, to demonstrate the BMRST system's ability to rapidly deploy, set up and support a rocket launch with the Quick Reaction Launch Vehicle (QRLV) rocket launching from this site.

After 11 September 2001, large elements of the squadron deployed to Qatar and MacDill Air Force Base in support of Operations Enduring Freedom and Iraqi Freedom. Additionally, the 114th CBCS received its second Air Force Outstanding Unit Award. The unit deployed to Kodiak again in May 2002 for a second QRLV launch.

In 2005, The 114 CBCS was re-designated the 114th Range Operations Squadron (114 ROPS) and their new mission was to provide survivable and reliable satellite voice and data communications for command control and logistics in support of United States Air Force, Air Force Space Command, and NATO communications requirements. With this change, the squadron's operational gaining command also shifted from ACC to the Air Force Space Command (AFSPC). The 114 ROPS supported launch range operation tracking of the NASA Space Transportation System, Atlas, Delta, and Titan launches for the 45th Space Wing (45 SW) at Patrick AFB and Cape Canaveral AFS.

The 114th received its third Air Force Outstanding Unit Award in 2009.

In 2011, the 114th supported the launch of STS-135, the orbiter Atlantis, on the final space shuttle mission.

Due to U.S. Air Force structure changes announced in March 2012, the 114 ROPS was scheduled for inactivation on 1 October 2012. However, this decision was reversed and instead the unit assumed a new mission as the 114th Space Control Squadron (114 SPCS) in April 2014. The first commander of the newly renamed squadron was Lt Col Johnny Malpass.

In November 2014, in order to comply with Air Force Instruction 38-101, several units of the Florida Air National Guard were administratively realigned under the 125th Fighter Wing (125 FW) as geographically separated units (GSUs) of the 125th as the new parent wing. This included administrative assignment of the 114 SPCS to the 125 FW.

With the inactivation of AFSPC and the establishment of the United States Space Force (USSF) in 2019 and the later redesignation of the 45 SW as Space Launch Delta 45 (SLD 45), the 114 SPCS operational gaining organization became the USSF. However, with the status of ANG units supporting the USSF unresolved, the 114 SPCS remained a USAF organization.

On 14 January 2023, the 114 SPCS was redesignated as the 114th Electromagnetic Warfare Squadron (114 EWS). The squadron's revised mission statement is to organize, train and equip personnel to conduct electromagnetic attacks in contested, congested and constrained environments downrange, using specialized equipment such as the counter communications system. It remains a GSU of the 125 FW but continues to receive operational taskings from the Space Force via SLD 45.

== Previous designations ==
- 114th Space Control Squadron (SPCS), 1992–2023
- 114th Range Operations Squadron, 2005–2014
- 114th Combat Communications Squadron, 1992–2005
- 114th Communications Squadron (NABS), 1989–1992

== Previous commanders ==
- Lt Col Anthony Surman, 2023-2026
- Col Scott McGuire, 2020–2023
- Lt Col (ret) Kyle Beatty, 2017–2020
- Lt Col (ret) Johnny Malpass, 2012–2017
- Lt Col (ret) Todd M. Oller, 2007–2012
- Lt Col (ret) Rembert N Schofield, 2003–2007
- Lt Col (ret) Daniel P. Bates, 1998–2003
- Lt Col (ret) Michele M. Agee, 1994–1998
- Col (ret) David H. Barnhart, 1991–1994
- Lt Col (ret) Robert Chandler, 1989–1991

== Bases stationed ==
- Patrick Air Force Base, Florida (1989-2020)
- Patrick Space Force Base, Florida (2020-present)
- Cape Canaveral Air Force Station, Florida (1989-2020)
- Cape Canaveral Space Force Station, Florida (2020-present)

== Equipment operated ==
- (1989-1991) TSC-85B Satellite Communications Terminal TSC-93B SATCOM
- (2001-2014) Ballistic Missile Range Safety Technology (BMRST)
