= Range Safety and Telemetry System =

Range Safety and Telemetry System (RSTS) is a GPS based, S-band telemetry receiving and UHF command destruct system, with two 5.4-meter telemetry and command destruct auto-tracking antennas. The system built by Honeywell International. The system is capable of providing four redundant telemetry links and expanding for added telemetry link receiving.

The prime purpose of the RSTS is to provide the range safety and telemetry functions necessary to track and verify a safe rocket flight within prescribed boundaries or safely terminate an errant rocket.

One of the, operationally identical, RSTS systems is located at the Kodiak Launch Center (KLC) in Alaska with the second mobile unit at varying mission specific sites, such as off-axis locations. Either system can act in conjunction with each other or as a stand-alone unit.

The RSTS is similar in design to the Ballistic Missile Range Safety Technology (BMRST) operated at Cape Canaveral Space Force Station, Florida.

== See also ==
- Index of aviation articles
