= Rubinstein–Taybi syndrome =

Rare genetic condition

- Other names: Broad thumb–hallux syndrome or Rubinstein syndrome
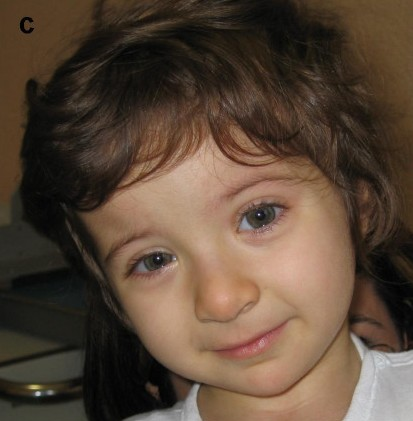
- Child displaying characteristic facial features of Rubinstein–Taybi syndrome
- Specialty: Medical genetics
- Causes: mutation or deletion in the CREBBP gene, located on chromosome 16, and/or the EP300 gene, located on chromosome 22.
- Frequency: 0.005%

Rubinstein–Taybi syndrome (RTS) is a rare type of microdeletion syndrome characterized by short stature, moderate to severe learning difficulties, distinctive facial features, and broad thumbs and first toes. Other features of the disorder vary among affected individuals. These characteristics are caused by a mutation or deletion in the CREBBP gene, located on chromosome 16, and/or the EP300 gene, located on chromosome 22.

This condition is sometimes inherited as an autosomal dominant pattern, but often as a de novo. It affects an estimated 1 in 125,000–300,000 births.

== Signs and symptoms ==
Rubinstein–Taybi Syndrome is characterized by intellectual disability, distinct facies, and atypical growth.

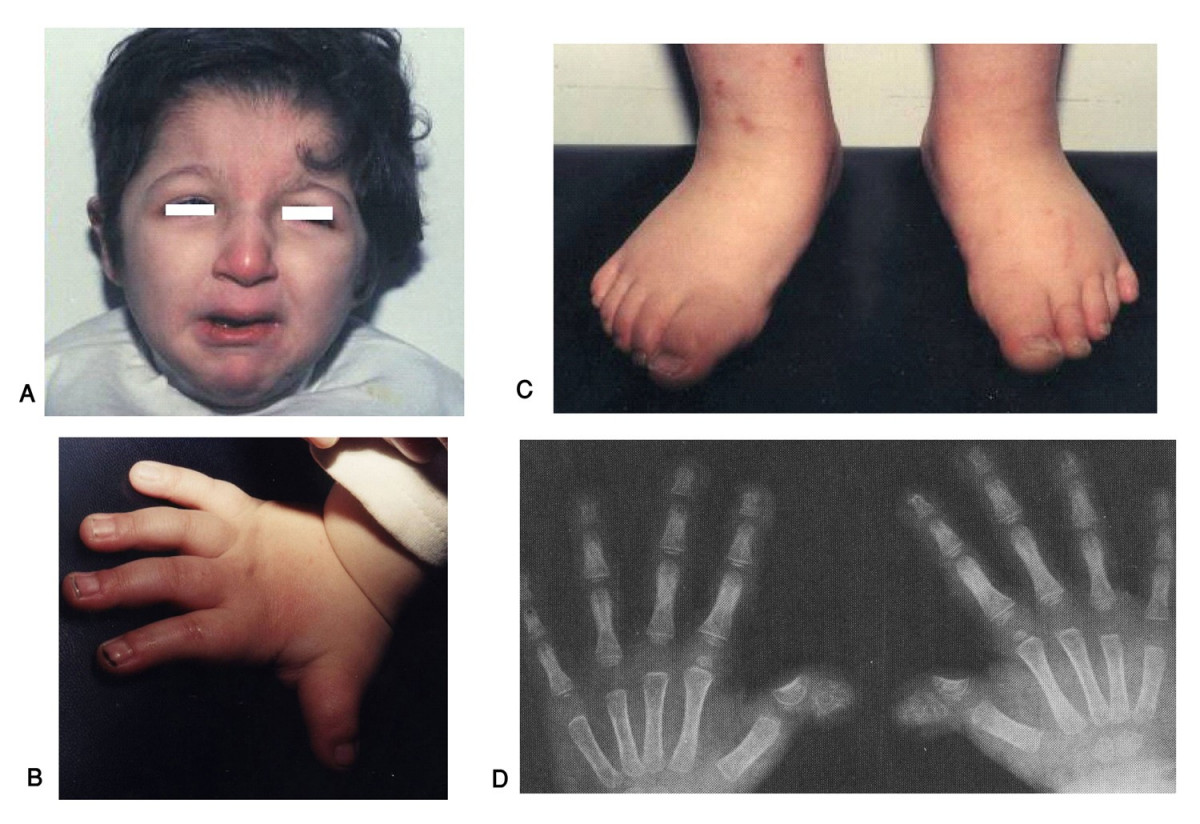
Facial features (A), left hand and feet showing broad thumb and big toes (B,C) and X-ray of both hands showing short broad thumbs (D)

=== Anatomical and musculoskeletal ===
Typical facial characteristics include a small chin and small oral cavity.

Other characteristics, which may vary by genetic cause of the disorder, include the following:

- Broad thumbs
- Broad first toes
- Clinodactyly of the 5th finger
- Radially-deviated thumbs
- Broad toes, which may cause difficulty walking and may be so severe in a minority of patients as to require surgical intervention.
- Small chin and small oral cavity
- Narrow, highly-arched palate, which can sometimes show clefting
  - In some cases, a relatively large tongue, bifid tongue tip, short frenulum, and wide alveolar ridges occur.
- Almost all patients with the condition have dental abnormalities, which can be primary or secondary to other aspects of the condition.

Hypermobility is common in the hip, elbows, fingers, thumbs, knees, and kneecaps, which may lead to stiffness and a waddling gait.

Scoliosis happens regularly in the condition, developing in late childhood and puberty. Other spinal abnormalities occur at higher rates than in the general population.

=== Cardiopulmonary ===
Congenital heart defects occur in about 30% of cases, among which the most common are patent ductus arteriosus, persistent foramen ovale, atrial septal defect, and ventricular septal defect.

Hypertension occurs in 10% of adults, and is caused by renal artery stenosis.

Mild respiratory distress is common in newborns, and upper respiratory infections are common over the lifespan. Lower respiratory infections are less common and, when present, often caused by the aforementioned gastroenterological problems.

Interstitial lung disease is rare, but can occur. Pulmonary functioning can be lowered due to scoliosis, and chronic sleep apnoea can cause pulmonary hypertension.

=== Dermatological ===
Keloids are the primary skin issue experienced by patients with the condition, the risk for which can be amplified or reduced by patient-specific and environmental factors. Keloids cannot develop spontaneously except in genetic conditions, and RTS provides the highest risk of keloid development. However, cancer risk isn't elevated due to these keloids.

Pilomatricomas are also a risk of the disease. Puberty is often a triggering factor.

Ingrown nails, congenital generalized hypertrichosis that becomes less marked with age, melanocytic naevi, white papulae on the limbs and trunk, additional nipples, lentigines, and café-au-lait spots are other findings associated with the condition.

=== Developmental ===
==== Birth and growth ====
During pregnancy, pre-eclampsia is highly common. Rates of pre-term and full-term birth match those found among the general population. While birth parameters are generally normal, there is a higher incidence of microcephaly and growth restriction than among the general population, possibly due to the higher preeclampsia rates.

Although size at birth is normal, children with the disorder will generally not grow as fast as their peers, and will generally fall to about 2 standard deviations below their peer's heights, weights, and head circumferences. Children affected by the disorder will not experience a growth spurt during puberty, leading to adult heights, weights, and head circumferences around 3 standard deviations below normal. Growth hormone (GH) deficiency is rare but possible, and can cause the child to go further below the growth patterns of typically developing children.

==== Milestones and intellectual disability ====
Individuals with the condition often experience milestones at a later date than typically-developing peers, but both populations experience wide ranges.

Intellectual disability and autism are common. A 2009 study found that children with RTS were more likely to be overweight and to have a short attention span, motor stereotypies, and poor coordination. The study hypothesized that the identified CREBBP gene impaired motor skills learning. Other research has shown a link with long-term memory (LTM) deficit. Generally, self-injurious and aggressive behavior are found in similar rates to the wider population of individuals with autism and intellectual disability. Some children will experience anxiety, and the presence of emotional outbursts and over-friendliness may be higher in this population. Repetitive behavior and especially repeated questioning is common in children with the condition, for which a variety of causes have been hypothesized. Distractability, impulsivity, and overactivity have been noted.

=== Endocrinological ===
A small number of newborns and young children with the condition will experience transient hypoglycemia, which can be well-managed. Hyperinsulinemic hypoglycemia is very rare, but can occur, especially if the disorder is caused by an EP300 variant.

=== Gastroenterological ===
Neonatal breastfeeding difficulties are present in roughly three quarters of affected individuals because of swallowing miscoordination, poor nipple grasp, hypotonia, and gastroesophogeal reflux disease (GERD). This leads to roughly 40% of babies requiring feeding support, up to and including PEG tubes. Very rarely, eosiniphilic estrophagitis may form.

There may be a higher rate of gastroentological complications among individuals with the disorder; namely, duodenal web and GI tract malrotation. Constipation is highly common.

=== Hypnological ===
Sleep can be affected by the facial abnormalities and increased laryngeal wall collapsibility. Sleep disorders are frequent, occurring moreso in children than adults. The risk of sleep disorders in children can be increased by more abnormal facial features, hypotonia, and adenotonsilar hypertrophy.

=== Immunological ===
While most individuals with the condition do not experience recurrent infections, other aspects of the condition, like gastric reflux, can cause immunological difficulties, and immune system dysfunctions have been reported in some individuals with the condition.

=== Neurological and spinal ===
Individuals commonly have corpus callosum malformations, followed in decreasing order of frequency by white matter abnormalities, cerebeller vermis malformations, and small/absent olfactory bulbs. Other brain malformations, including glandular, are uncommon but do occur, as is also true for spinal malformations.

While individuals often have abnormal EEG findings, clinical manifestations of epilepsy occur infrequently.

=== Oncological ===
Newer studies have reversed older studies' findings that younger individuals with the condition have higher rates of cancer; data for older individuals is incomplete. However, benign tumors present at higher rates.

=== Opthalmalogical ===
Ocular abnormalities and reduced vision are present at a higher rate in this population. There is a higher incidence of watery eye due to congenital issues in this population. Glaucoma is rare; it can be unilateral or bilateral and can be associated with anterior segment anomalies such as iris coloboma or ectopia lentis that can cause tearing, blepharospasm, photophobia, and enlargement of the eye manifesting as megalocornea and rapidly increasing myopia. Coloboma is reported in 10% of individuals and can affect any or all of following structures: iris, choroid, retina, or optic nerve.

Up to a quarter of individuals with RTS will have cataracts, generally in the first two months of life but sometimes later on which are often congenital.

Retinal abnormalities are frequent in this population. (Note: There is more on this subject in the cited paper, but it references an as-then unpublished paper by Van Genderen for that material, so I chose not to include it. I did a simple search to look for it and little was found, but another editor might could look again.)

Visual impairment occurs in a fifth of patients, often caused by the anatomical abnormalities associated with the condition. In severe cases, infantile nystagmus may follow from decresed sensory input from the eyes starting at birth. Refractive errors and strabismus occur in half to three quarters of individuals, and their severity may change rapidly.

=== Otolaryngological ===
Recurrent middle ear infections can be caused by airway difficulties, which are themselves caused by the GORD and unique facial structures. This may cause conductive, sensorineural, and mixed hearing loss.

=== Urinogenitary ===
23% of individuals with RTS have urinary tract anomalies, including horseshoe kidney, renal duplication, renal agenesis, renal dysplasia, hydronephrosis, nephrolithiasis and vesicoureteral reflux. Renal artery stenosis can cause hypertension in children with the condition.

Shawl scrotum formation is common. 59% of men have cryptorchidism on one or both sides. Hypospadias in both sexes and labia minora fusion are rarer. Uterine malfunctions are rare. Female patients may have hypermenorrhagia or metrorhaggia.

== Genetics ==
Rubinstein–Taybi syndrome is inherited in an autosomal dominant fashion.

Rubinstein–Taybi syndrome, in many cases, is a microdeletion syndrome involving chromosomal segment 16p13.3 and is characterized by mutations in the CREBBP gene. Varying amounts of material are deleted from this section of the chromosome and account for the spectrum of physiological symptoms.

The CREBBP gene makes a protein that helps control the activity of many other genes. The protein, called CREB-binding protein, plays an important role in regulating cell growth and division and is essential for normal fetal development. If one copy of the CREBBP gene is deleted or mutated, cells make only half of the normal amount of CREB binding protein. A reduction in the amount of this protein disrupts normal development before and after birth, leading to the signs and symptoms of Rubinstein–Taybi syndrome.

Mutations in the EP300 gene, located on chromosome 22q13.2, are responsible for a small percentage of cases of Rubinstein–Taybi syndrome. These mutations result in the loss of one copy of the gene in each cell, which reduces the amount of p300 protein by half. Some mutations lead to the production of a very short, nonfunctional version of the p300 protein, while others prevent one copy of the gene from making any protein at all. Although researchers do not know how a reduction in the amount of p300 protein leads to the specific features of Rubinstein–Taybi syndrome, it is clear that the loss of one copy of the EP300 gene disrupts normal development.

CREBBP and p300 are the respective protein products of the paralogous genes CREBBP and EP300. Both of these related proteins, prototypical members of the p300-CBP coactivator family, have a bromodomain and a histone acetyltransferase domain and are able to bind to various gene-specific transcription factors as well as general transcription factors. Cell lines derived from RTS patients exhibit diminished acetylation of multiple histone proteins, particularly histone 2A and histone 2B, suggesting that this disease has its origins in problems with the regulatory mechanisms of transcription. The functions of CREBBP and p300 broadly overlap but do have co-activator–specific effects on gene expression. The proteins may also facilitate transcriptional elongation.

In approximately one third of the cases showing RTS symptoms, neither the CREBBP gene, nor the EP300 gene appear to be the cause of the disease.

A mouse model has been identified in order to perform experimental research procedures. The mice exhibited the same clinical RTS symptoms seen in humans, and the model has become a foundation for future research.

== Diagnosis ==
RTS can be diagnosed through clinical features and can be confirmed through genetic testing. However, 30% of cases do not have a known genetic basis.

RTS is diagnosed when a heterozygous pathogenic variant of the CREBBP gene is identified in the individual. It exhibits an autosomal dominant inheritance pattern, but some documented cases show heterozygous individuals exhibiting germline mosaicism. This condition affects men and women equally, and is often misdiagnosed with other diseases or developmental disabilities.

== Treatment ==
There is no existing treatment that reverses or cures RTS. There are, however, ways to manage and reduce symptoms for patients. Due to there being a wide range of symptoms, RTS patients are referred to specialists that focus on each specific symptom. According to a meta-analysis of the condition in which diagnostic criteria were formed, the diagnostic workup of an infant with RTS should include glaucoma and coloboma opthalmalogical exams, cardiac assessment, and renal ultrasound. After diagnosis, male patients should also have a careful examination for cryptorchidism.

Children with the condition may have a higher pain threshold, increasing the need for medical providers to be watchful.

Many treatment strategies for patients with the condition are the same for those without.

The coloboma cannot be cured, but the associated glare can be mitigated with the wearing of sunglasses. Frequent eye checkups are needed so that the corrective prescription may be modified correctly, especially below the age of 5. To prevent ambylopia, high refractive errors need correction.

Individuals suffering from cognitive developments usually are part of special education programs and speech therapy. Regular check-ups and monitoring are needed for cardiac, dental, auditory, and renal abnormalities. Genetic counseling is also recommended for affected individuals and their families.

Keloid treatment is difficult in patients with RTS; recurrence is high.

Contraceptives can aid in treatment of menstrual issues sometimes experienced by patients.

The broad toes of the condition may, in rare cases, require surgical intervention. Surgical intervention for thumb deviation may be less impactful due to the thumbs generally functioning well before surgery and common recurrence of the deviation after surgery.

Regular intervention is required to prevent mobility issues from spiraling into a need for mobility aids.

Various educational and communicative interventions may be needed if the individual experiences intellectual disability.

=== Anaesthesia and other surgical considerations ===
48% of adults with the disorder require surgery at least once, with half of them requiring two or more surgeries. Children with the disorder receive anaesthetics at a proportion higher than typically developing children.

Anaesthesia may be dangerous in these patients. In some cases, individuals with Rubinstein–Taybi syndrome may have complications, such as respiratory distress and irregular heartbeats when the muscle relaxant succinylcholine or the anaesthetic atropine are administered.

Primary literature suggests the children may have a higher rate of cardiac physical and conduction abnormalities which may cause unexpected results with cardioactive medications. Changes in the face and airway structure may making it more difficult to secure the airway under anaesthesia; rarely, the placement of nasopharyngeal or oropharyngeal airway devices may be inhibited due to unique anatomical structures. However, complications appeared in a minority of cases, and routine methods of airway control in the operating room appears to be successful.

Laryngomalacia and augmented airway reactivity can complicate perioperative ventilation and post-exubation care.

Opioid use is not contraindicated for pain management in these patients, but the meta-analysis urges "judicious" use of the medications to prevent apnoeas and the exacerbation of obstructive symptoms; it instead recommends the use of non-steroidal anti-inflammatory medications. It also recommends that procedures be bundled to reduce the risk of anaesthetic complications.

According to the meta-analysis, polysomonography should be considered before surgery.

== History ==
Rubinstein–Taybi syndrome was first unofficially mentioned in a French orthopedic medical journal in 1957 by three Greek doctors. The medical journal reported a case concerning a seven-year-old boy with radically deviated/arched thumbs, long nose, muscular hypotonia, and physical and mental underdevelopment. At this point in time the case study mentioned by the Greek physicians was considered to be an anomaly due to the fact that there had not been any other reported cases of children with these specific physical and mental characteristics.

Rubinstein and Taybi, the doctors accredited with discovering the syndrome, were unaware of this journal at the time of their discovery. However, it is acknowledged that the 1957 case reported in the French journal of orthopedic medicine is most likely the first reported case of RTS.

Dr. Jack Herbert Rubinstein, an American pediatrician. reported assessing a three-year-old girl and a seven-year-old boy with unusual facial and digital findings in 1958. Having sensed a similarity between these two cases, Rubinstein tried distributing photos and information concerning these two cases to other clinics in the U.S. from 1959 to 1960.

In 1961, Dr. Hooshang Taybi, an Iranian-American pediatric radiologist, reported having assessed a three-year-old boy that appeared to have the same syndrome as described by Rubinstein. By the summer of 1963, Dr. Taybi reported having evaluated seven children with such characteristics as broad thumbs and great toes, unusual facial features, and intellectual disabilities – these findings went on to appear in the American Journal of Diseases of Children documenting these characteristics as a syndrome.

In 1992, the first genetic abnormalities that act as markers for Rubinstein–Taybi syndrome were identified. These abnormalities are said to affect either chromosome 16 or chromosome 22. The specific chromosome impacted by a mutation determines the type of Rubinstein–Taybi syndrome that may occur. A mutation of the CREBBP gene on chromosome 16 gives rise to the first form of RTS (most common), while a mutation of the EP300 gene on chromosome 22 is characteristic of the second form of RTS.

== See also ==
- Nasodigitoacoustic syndrome
- List of cutaneous conditions
