= GIANT consortium =

International human genetics research collaboration

The Genetic Investigation of ANthropometric Traits or GIANT consortium is an international collaboration of human genetics researchers dedicated to studying the genetic architecture of anthropometric traits such as human height and body mass index. The consortium is led by Joel Hirschhorn.
