= 3p deletion syndrome =

Medical condition

- Other names: 3p- syndrome, 3p monosomy.
- Ideogram of the human chromosome 3.
- Specialty: Medical genetics

3p deletion syndrome is a rare genetic disorder caused by the deletion of small fragments of chromosome 3.

== Signs and symptoms ==
Reported symptoms in patients with 3p deletion syndrome Include: intellectual disability, delayed psychomotor development, abnormal facial features, muscular hypotonia, epilepsy, and deformation of the gastrointestinal and urinary tracts.

== Causes ==
3p deletion syndrome is brought on by the loss of chromosome 3's small (p) arm's end. The majority of 3p deletion syndrome instances are not hereditary. One chromosome is deleted, usually randomly, either in the early stages of fetal development or during the production of reproductive cells, such as eggs or sperm. Affected individuals in these situations do not have a family history of the condition. Rarely, 3p deletion syndrome is inherited; typically, it comes from a parent who has modest symptoms. A parent who is unaffected and has a chromosomal rearrangement between chromosome 3 and another chromosome may potentially pass on the deletion to their offspring.

== Epidemiology ==
Fewer than 60 cases have been reported as of 2021.

== See also ==
- Chromosomal deletion syndrome
- 3q29 microdeletion syndrome
