= Microdeletion syndrome =

Syndrome caused by chromosomal deletion

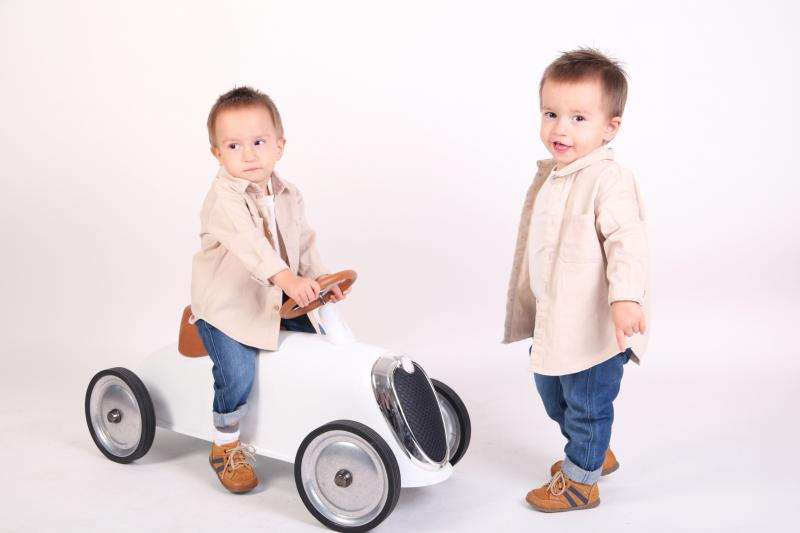
Twins in Poland with 22q11 microdeletion syndrome

A microdeletion syndrome is a syndrome caused by a chromosomal deletion smaller than 5 million base pairs (5 Mb) spanning several genes that is too small to be detected by conventional cytogenetic methods or high resolution karyotyping (2–5 Mb). Detection is done by fluorescence in situ hybridization (FISH). Larger chromosomal deletion syndromes are detectable using karyotyping techniques.

== Examples ==
- DiGeorge syndrome or velocardiofacial syndrome – most common microdeletion syndrome
- Prader–Willi syndrome
- Angelman syndrome
- Neurofibromatosis type I
- Neurofibromatosis type II
- Williams syndrome
- Miller–Dieker syndrome
- Smith–Magenis syndrome
- Rubinstein–Taybi syndrome
- Wolf–Hirschhorn syndrome
