= Kurt Hirschhorn =

Scientist and medical doctor

- Born: May 18, 1926; Vienna, Austria
- Died: November 25, 2022 (aged 96)
- Known for: Identifying the chromosomal defects that underlie Wolf–Hirschhorn syndrome
- Spouse: Rochelle Hirschhorn
- Children: Joel Hirschhorn
- Awards: William Allan Award; John Howland Award
- Scientific career
- Workplaces: Icahn School of Medicine at Mount Sinai, New York City

Kurt Hirschhorn (May 18, 1926 – November 25, 2022) was an Austrian-born American pediatrician, medical geneticist, and cytogeneticist who identified the chromosomal defects that underlie Wolf–Hirschhorn syndrome. He was the 2006 recipient of the John Howland Award, the highest award bestowed by the American Pediatric Society (APS).

== Early life ==
Hirschhorn was born in Vienna. Fleeing anti-Semitic persecution, the family relocated to Switzerland, then to the US, briefly in New York City before settling in Pittsburgh, Pennsylvania.

== Career ==
Hirschhorn was Professor of Pediatrics, Genetics and Genomic Sciences, and Medicine Chairman Emeritus of Pediatrics at the Icahn School of Medicine at Mount Sinai in New York City. He was a fellow of the Hastings Center, an independent bioethics research institution.

== Honors and awards ==
In 1995, Hirschhorn received the William Allan Award in human medical genetics.

== Personal life ==
Hirschhorn was married to Rochelle Hirschhorn, who was chief of the Division of Medical Genetics at New York University for 24 years. Their son Joel Hirschhorn is also a human geneticist.

== Wolf–Hirschhorn syndrome ==
Wolf–Hirschhorn syndrome (WHS), caused by a chromosomal abnormality, is characterized by typical craniofacial features in infancy consisting of "Greek warrior helmet appearance" of the nose (the broad bridge of the nose continuing to the forehead), microcephaly, high forehead with prominent glabella, ocular hypertelorism, epicanthus, highly arched eyebrows, short philtrum, downturned mouth, micrognathia, and poorly formed ears with pits/tags.

All affected individuals have prenatal-onset growth deficiency followed by postnatal growth retardation and hypotonia with muscle underdevelopment. Developmental delay and mental deficiency of variable degree is present in all.
