= Wolf–Hirschhorn syndrome =

Chromosomal deletion syndrome

- Other names: Chromosome deletion Dillan 4p syndrome, Pitt–Rogers–Danks syndrome (PRDS), Pitt syndrome
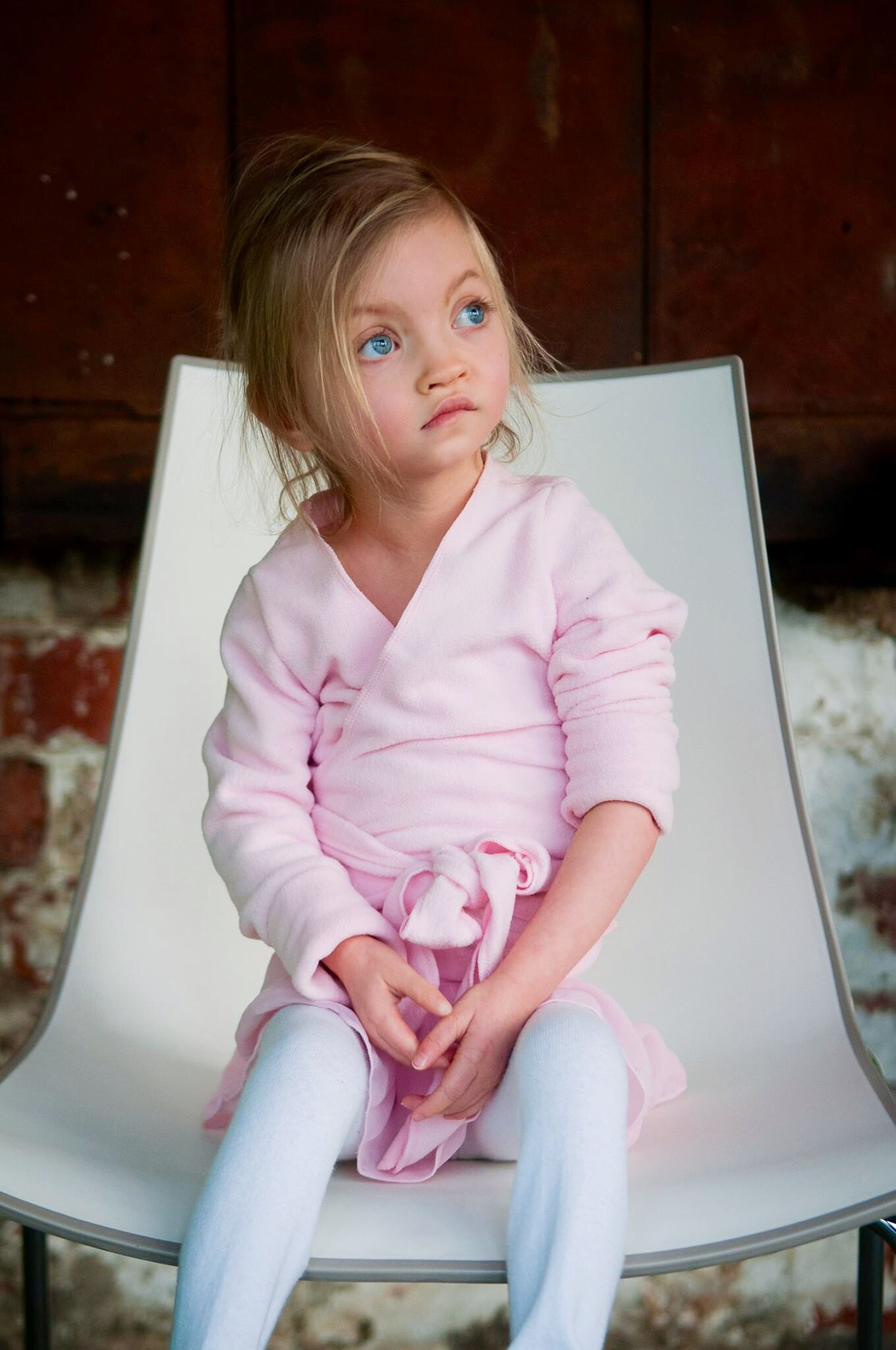
- Young girl displaying characteristic facial features of Wolf–Hirschhorn syndrome
- Specialty: Medical genetics
- Frequency: 0.005%

Wolf–Hirschhorn syndrome (WHS) is a chromosomal deletion syndrome resulting from a partial deletion on the short arm of chromosome 4 [del(4)(p16.3)]. Features include a distinct craniofacial phenotype and intellectual disability.

== Signs and symptoms ==
The most common characteristics include a distinct craniofacial phenotype (microcephaly, micrognathia, short philtrum, prominent glabella, ocular hypertelorism, dysplastic ears and periauricular tags), growth restriction, intellectual disability, muscle hypotonia, seizures, and congenital heart defects.

Less common characteristics include hypospadias, colobomata of the iris, renal anomalies, and deafness. Antibody deficiencies are also common, including common variable immunodeficiency and IgA deficiency. T-cell immunity is normal.

== Genetics ==
Wolf–Hirschhorn syndrome is a microdeletion syndrome caused by a deletion within HSA band 4p16.3 of the short arm of chromosome 4, particularly in the region of WHSCR1 and WHSCR2. The phenotypic characteristics of WHS are thought to be caused by the haploinsufficiency of the genes Wolf–Hirschhorn syndrome candidate 1 (WHSC1), which is associated with craniofacial features and growth delay, and Homo Sapiens leucine zipper-EF-hand containing transmembrane protein 1 (LETM1), which is associated with seizures.

About 87% of cases represent a de novo deletion, while about 13% are inherited from a parent with a chromosome translocation. In the cases of familial transmission, there is a 2 to 1 excess of maternal transmission. Of the de novo cases, 80% are paternally derived.

A more uncommon cause for WHS is the formation of a ring chromosome. A ring chromosome can form when a chromosome breaks apart and forms a circular structure to fuse together. That process may initiate gene loss towards the ends of the chromosome.

Severity of symptoms and expressed phenotype differ based on the amount of genetic material deleted. The critical region for determining the phenotype is at 4p16.3 and can often be detected through genetic testing and fluorescence in situ hybridization (FISH). Genetic testing and genetic counseling is offered to affected families.

== Diagnosis ==
Initial diagnosis is based on a distinct craniofacial phenotype after birth. Diagnosis of WHS is confirmed by the detection of a deletion in the WHSCR. Chromosomal microarray and Cytogenetic analysis.D4S96 or D4Z1 chromosome band 4p16.3–specific probe (Wolf–Hirschhorn region, Vysis, Inc) is available for FISH study.

== Treatment ==
The symptoms can vary from person to person, so the patient should receive different types of evaluations including a neurological, cardiac, and renal evaluation. Eye and hearing exams are essential, as well as a feeding and developmental evaluation. Clinicians treat WHS by addressing the symptoms experienced by the individual. Some treatment methods are surgery for growth abnormalities, educational programs that can help with cognition, physical therapy for muscle building, and medication for seizures.

== Epidemiology ==
The minimum birth incidence has been estimated at approximately 1 in 50,000. Several reports note that Wolf–Hirschhorn appears about twice as often in females as in males, although the cause of this imbalance remains unclear. Possible explanations include diagnostic bias, greater early male lethality, or under-recognition in males. Given the limited data available, this ratio should be interpreted with caution.

== History ==
Wolf–Hirschhorn syndrome was first described in 1961 by the Austrian-born American pediatrician Kurt Hirschhorn and his colleagues.

Thereafter, the syndrome gained worldwide attention after publications by the German geneticist Ulrich Wolf and his co-workers, specifically their articles in the German scientific magazine Humangenetik.
