= Horseshoe kidney =

- Other names: Renal fusion
- Specialty: Nephrology

Horseshoe kidney, also known as ren arcuatus (in Latin), renal fusion or super kidney, is a congenital disorder affecting about 1 in 500 people that is more common in men, often asymptomatic, and usually diagnosed incidentally. In this disorder, the patient's kidneys fuse to form a horseshoe-shape during development in the womb. The fused part is the isthmus of the horseshoe kidney. The abnormal anatomy can affect kidney drainage resulting in increased frequency of kidney stones and urinary tract infections as well as increase risk of certain renal cancers.

Fusion abnormalities of the kidney can be categorized into two groups: horseshoe kidney and crossed fused ectopia. The "horseshoe kidney" is the most common renal fusion anomaly.

== Signs and symptoms ==
Axial CT image of the abdomen showing a horseshoe kidney.

Although often asymptomatic, the most common presenting symptom of patients with a horseshoe kidney is abdominal or flank pain. However, presentation is often non-specific. Approximately a third of patients with horseshoe kidneys remain asymptomatic throughout their entire life with over 50% of patients having no medical issues related to their renal fusion when followed for a 25-year period. As a result, it is estimated that approximately 25% of patients with horseshoe kidneys are diagnosed incidentally with ultrasound or CT imaging.

=== Associated conditions ===
Patients with a horseshoe kidney can develop sequelae related to the abnormal anatomy and present with symptoms related to them.

Individuals that have a horseshoe kidney may be at increased risk for conditions that generally fall within the following categories:

- Kidney obstruction – commonly causes ureteropelvic junction obstruction (UPJ) which is a blockage at the area where the ureter connects to the renal pelvis. This can lead to urinary stasis which can promote infection and stone formation.
- Kidney infections – associated with vesicoureteral reflux (present in approximately 50% of all patients with renal fusion) which is an abnormal reflux of urine back into the ureters that increases risk of urinary tract infections.
- Kidney stones – deviant orientation of kidneys combined with slow urine flow and kidney obstruction may increase the risk of developing kidney stones. Treatment is further complicated if patient possesses aberrant skeletal anatomy. It is estimated 36% of patients with horseshoe kidneys will develop kidney stones.
- Kidney cancer – increased frequency of certain renal cancers such as transitional cell tumors, Wilms tumors, and carcinoid tumors.
- Heart abnormalities – ventricular septal defect.
- Neurological abnormalities - encephalocoele, myelomeningocele, spina bifida.
- Skeletal abnormalities - kyphosis, scoliosis, hemivertebra, and micrognathia.
- Genitourinary abnormalities - septate vagina, bicornuate uterus, hypospadias, undescended testis, adult polycystic kidney disease, and more than two kidneys.
- Genetic abnormalities - Turner syndrome, Down syndrome, Patau syndrome, Edward syndrome, and orocraniodigital syndrome.

Intravenous pyelogram showing horseshoe kidney.

== Cause ==
There have been several proposed factors that may contribute to the development of a horseshoe kidney. Different exposures to the developing fetus such as different teratogens (e.g. thalidomide, ethanol, ACE inhibitors, cocaine, gentamicin, corticosteroids, NSAIDs, and vitamin A) have been hypothesized. Impairment of a developing embryo's nephrogenic cell migration or abnormal migration of the kidneys due to fetal structural abnormalities is another potential factor. However, no definitive genetic cause has been identified.

== Pathophysiology ==
Kidneys are normally located in the retroperitoneal space between the T12 and L3 vertebrae after ascending from the pelvis during development to rest underneath the adrenal glands. In patients with this condition, the horseshoe kidney ascent is commonly arrested by the inferior mesenteric artery due to the central fusion of the kidneys. However, this is present in only 40% of cases, and, in 20% of cases, the fused kidney remains in the pelvis. Its ascension may also be restricted by its own renal artery. Additionally, during normal development, the kidneys undergo a 90 degree medial rotation while ascending. However, due to the renal fusion, this rotation is impaired resulting in abnormal placement of the ureters. This in turn can lead to urinary stasis and drainage issues. Furthermore, approximately 70% of kidneys in normal individuals are supplied by a single renal artery with the remaining 30% having embryonic collateral or accessory arteries. With horseshoe kidneys, the majority are supplied by derivatives of the abdominal aorta or common illiac arteries depending on the final position of the kidneys.

== Diagnosis ==
Horseshoe kidneys are commonly diagnosed incidentally on abdominal imaging. The diagnosis can be made with many different imaging modalities such as ultrasound, intravenous pyelogram, CT, and MRI.

Common features that can be found on imaging include:

- Midline symmetrical fusion (present in 90% of cases) or lateral asymmetric fusion (present in 10% of cases) of the lower poles
- Position of fused kidneys are lower than normal with incomplete medial rotation
- Renal pelvis and ureters are positioned more anteriorly and ventrally cross the isthmus
- Isthmus that may be positioned below the inferior mesenteric artery
- Variant arterial supply that can originate from the abdominal aorta or common illiac arteries
- Lower poles of kidney that extend ventromedially and may be poorly defined

== Treatment ==
Symphysiotomy, which involves separating the fused isthmus in order to release the kidneys, used to be a recommended treatment for this condition but has fallen out of favor due to complications and minimal benefit. Furthermore, kidneys can remain in their original abnormal location after the surgery. Instead, management focuses on treating the sequelae should the patient become symptomatic.

While treatment typically does not differ from that of patients with normal kidney anatomy, kidney stones can warrant a different approach. Extracorporeal shockwave lithotripsy, a possible treatment for kidney stones, can be less effective in patients with horseshoe kidneys due to the abnormal anatomy causing difficulties with localizing the energy to the stones. Also, due to the kidney obstruction that can commonly occur with this renal fusion, clearance of the resulting stone fragments can also be impaired. For this reason, prior to any treatment with shockwave lithotripsy, a UPJ obstruction must first be ruled out as it significantly impair successful treatment. For stones that are less than 1.5 cm, ureteroscopy and shockwave lithotripsy can be first utilized. For stones larger than 1.5 cm or when previous treatment has failed, the stones can instead be removed through a minimally invasive procedure known as percutaneous nephrolithotomy.

Compared to patients with normal kidneys, patients with horseshoe kidneys who undergo treatment with percutaneous nephrolithotomy experience no difference in complications or stone clearance.

Patients will also typically require imaging before any abdominal surgery as the vascular supply to the abnormal kidney can be highly variable between patients. Additionally, the horseshoe kidneys can have a close association with colon which can increase risk of bowel injury.

== Epidemiology ==
There is an incidence of 1 in every 500 individuals within a normal population.

Males are more likely to develop a horseshoe kidney with a preponderance of 2:1.

Certain genetic diseases can predispose patients to developing a horseshoe kidney:

- Edwards Syndrome: 67%
- Turner Syndrome: 14-20%
- Down syndrome: <1%

== Notable cases ==
- Mel Gibson is affected with this condition.
- Sam Kinison, an American comedian, also had this condition.
