= Fred Winston =

American geneticist

Fred Winston

Fred Marshall Winston (born 1952) is the John Emory Andrus Professor of Genetics in the Harvard Medical School Genetics Department, where he has been a member of the faculty since 1983. Research in his laboratory has focused on mechanisms of transcription and the regulation of chromatin structure in the budding yeast Saccharomyces cerevisiae and the fission yeast Schizosaccharomyces pombe. Dr. Winston served as the President of the Genetics Society of America in 2009 and has been elected to both the American Academy of Arts and Sciences (2009) and the National Academy of Sciences (2013).

Dr. Winston has served as a Senior Editor for the Genetics Society of America journal Genetics and is Chair of the GSA Publications Committee.

Dr. Winston received a BA in Biology from the University of Chicago in 1974 and a PhD from the Massachusetts Institute of Technology in 1980, where he conducted research with Dr. David Botstein on phage P22 lysogenization. He went on to conduct postdoctoral studies on S. cerevisiae transcription with Dr. Gerald Fink at Cornell University and the Whitehead Institute for Biomedical Research.
