= Ectopic kidney =

Malposition of the kidney

- Other names: Renal ectopia
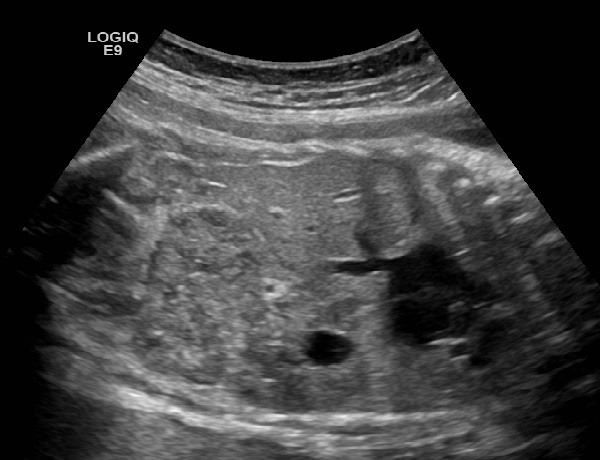
- Ectopic crossed fused kidney in a fetus approx. 34 weeks
- Specialty: Nephrology

An ectopic kidney is a kidney that is not located in its usual position (ectopia) in the lumbar retroperitoneal space. It is the result of anomalous migration of the kidneys from their origin in the fetal pelvis during embryogenesis.

The diagnosis is usually made during antenatal and/or postnatal testing, when the ectopic kidney is found incidentally. Although most patients with renal ectopia are asymptomatic, some can develop symptoms due to complications such as kidney stones, urinary tract infections and hydronephrosis.

== Embryology ==
The kidney arises from the intermediate mesoderm and has three embryological forms: pronephros, mesonephros and metanephros. The pronephros and mesonephros are the primitive transient stages, while the metanephros is the final and functional stage that later forms the permanent kidneys.

The metanephros is formed at around fifth to sixth week of gestation and is composed of the metanephric mesenchyme (the proper kidney) and the ureteric bud (collecting system and ureter). This metanephric unit then ascends from the pelvis into the retroperitoneal renal fossa while simultaneously rotating 90° so that the developing kidney is positioned vertically with the hilum pointing medially. This whole process of renal ascent and rotation is generally completed by the eighth to ninth week of gestation.

When the mature kidney fails to ascend to its normal location in the retroperitoneal space between T12 to L3 vertebral levels, it is called an ectopic kidney. Numerous factors have been hypothesized to affect the proper ascent and rotation of the kidneys, including genetic factors, developmental defects in the metanephric tissue and the ureteric bud, teratogens and maternal illnesses and exposures during pregnancy.

== Classification ==
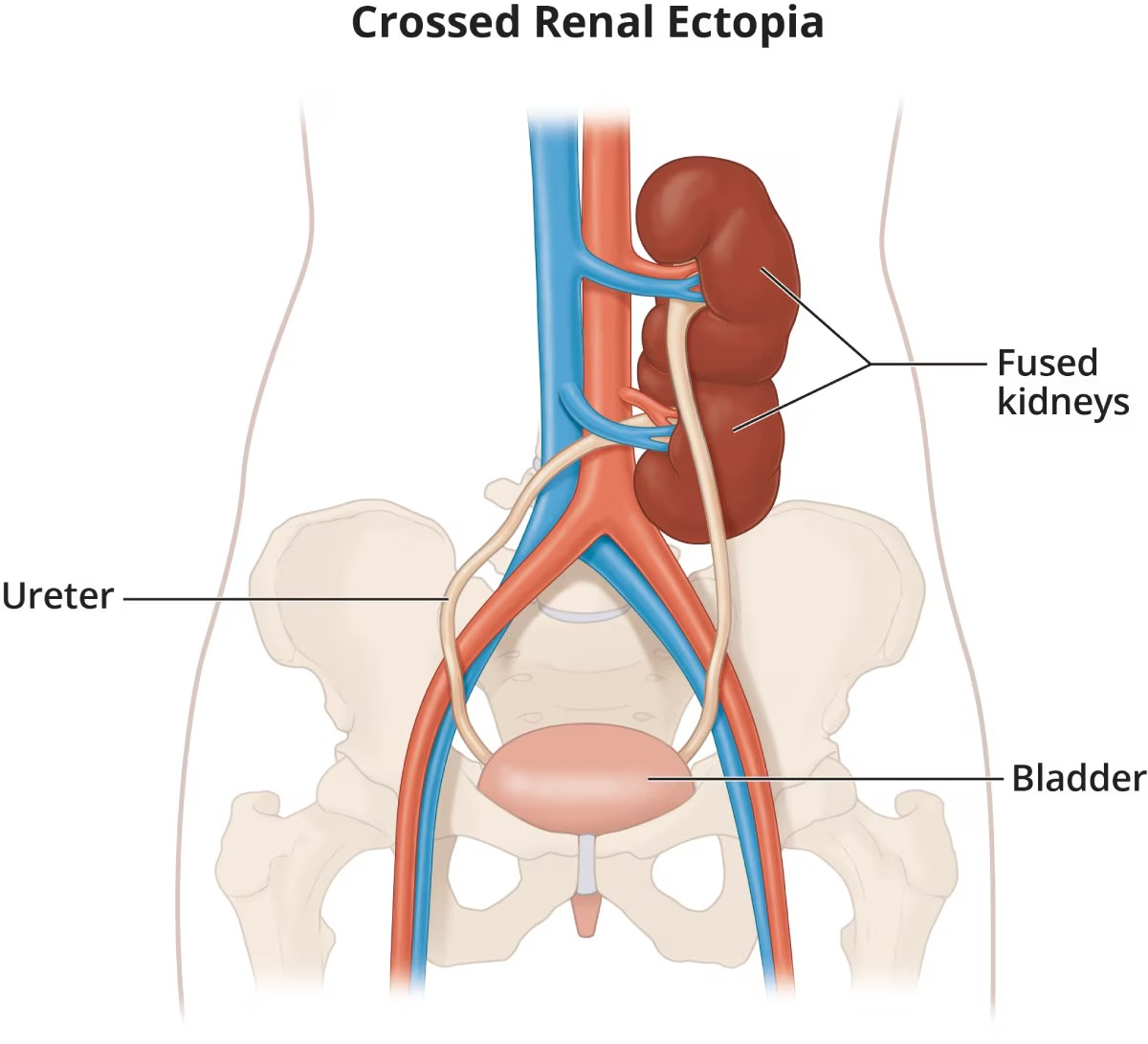
Diagram showing a crossed ectopic kidney with fusion to the ipsilateral kidney

An ectopic kidney can be classified based on its location in the corresponding cavity, whether it is simple or crossed and whether there is associated fusion with the ipsilateral kidney.

The types of ectopic kidney include:

- Simple: kidney that remains on the same side of the body but in an abnormal location.
- Crossed: kidney that crosses the midline so that it's on the opposite side of the body. It can be with or without fusion to the ipsilateral kidney.
- Cephalad: kidney that ascends until its reaches the level of T10 vertebra, just below the diaphragm. This type is usually associated with omphaloceles and other abdominal wall defects.
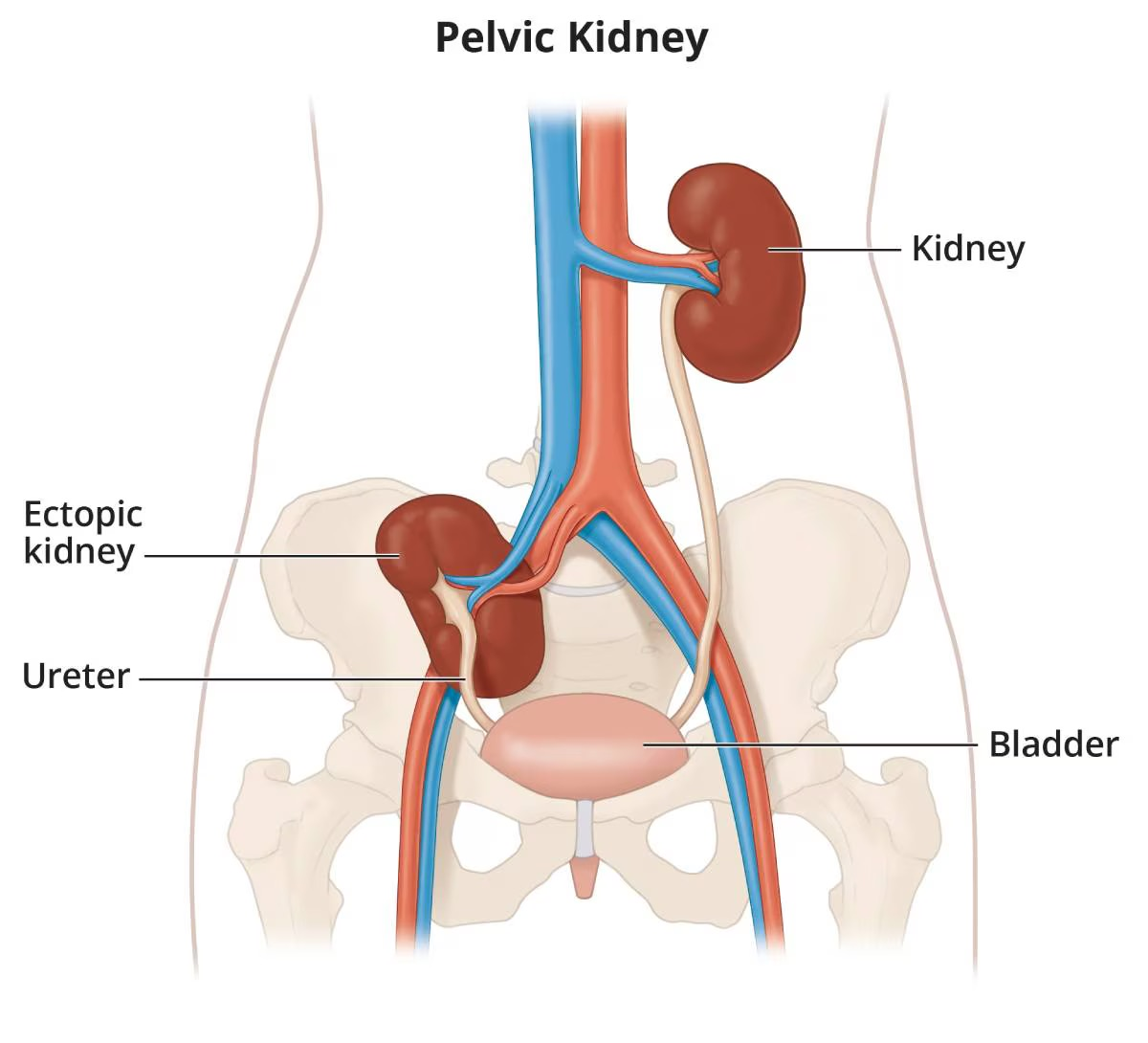
  Diagram showing a pelvic ectopic kidney
- Thoracic: kidney that protrudes through the diaphragm into the posterior mediastinum. An intrathoracic kidney could be a "real" ectopic kidney without any diaphragm abnormalities or can be related to diaphragmatic hernias or traumatic diaphragm ruptures.
- Pelvic: kidney that fails to ascend and remains in the pelvic brim, below the level of aortic bifurcation.
- Abdominal: kidney that is anywhere between its origin in the pelvis and its normal position in the renal fossa.

== Incidence ==
Data on the incidence of ectopic kidneys is inconsistent since renal ectopia may be diagnosed antenatally, but it also may be asymptomatic and found only incidentally or postmortem. Average incidence is about 1 in 900 in autopsy studies and 1 in 3000 in imaging studies. The incidence also varies depending on the type of ectopy. For example, pelvic kidneys are seen in 1 per 2000 to 1 per 3000 cases and are generally more common than cephalad and intrathoracic kidneys which only occur in 1 per 22,000 cases.

== Characteristics ==
=== Rotation ===
Since kidney ascension and rotation occur simultaneously, a faulty ascension generally results in an incomplete rotation so that the hilum is facing anteriorly instead of medially. The axis of the ectopic kidney may be vertical, medial or horizontal depending on how far up it has ascended.

=== Shape ===
The shape of the ectopic kidney can vary depending on its location and the nearby structures. It could retain its normal bean shape, or it can be irregular, lobulated, underdeveloped, or even dysplastic.

=== Blood supply ===
The vascular supply is usually anomalous and it varies depending on where ascension is halted. Renal arteries may originate from the distal aorta, the aortic bifurcation, the iliac arteries or the inferior mesenteric artery.

=== Ureter ===
The ureter of an ectopic kidney inserts normally into the bladder on the ipsilateral side, except when there is an associated ectopic ureter, which is rare. The ureter can also be longer (such as in cephalad and thoracic kidneys) or shorter (such as in pelvic kidneys) to accommodate for the distance traveled.

=== Adrenal gland ===
The adrenal gland undergoes embryological development separate from that of the kidney, and so it retains its normal location in the retroperitoneal renal fossa even with the presence of an ectopic kidney.

== Associated conditions ==
Ectopic kidneys are commonly associated with genital anomalies such as hypospadias and cryptorchidism in males and vaginal or uterine agenesis, unicornuate, bicornuate or septate uterus in females. Other non-urogenital anomalies can also be present and they usually involve cardiac and skeletal structures. Renal ectopia is also sometimes part of a congenital syndrome.

== Diagnosis ==
An ectopic kidney is often diagnosed antenatally when ultrasonography reveals an empty renal fossa with a normal amniotic fluid volume, which should prompt search for the kidney in other locations.

However, if renal ectopia is not diagnosed in the antenatal or postnatal periods, it may remain asymptomatic and be diagnosed incidentally. It can also result in complications such as urinary tract infections (UTIs), kidney stones, vesicoureteral reflux (VUR), or hydronephrosis which would lead to the diagnosis of an ectopic kidney. Symptoms related to these complications include abdominal pain, palpable mass, urinary incontinence, fever and hematuria.

== Evaluation ==
Initial evaluation for ectopic kidneys generally includes the following elements:

- A physical exam to check for obvious urogenital and non-urogenital deformities.
- Blood tests such as serum creatinine to assess the kidney function.
- Urinalysis to check for associated complications.
- Imaging studies such as ultrasound, voiding cystourethrograms, radionuclide scans, or MRI to assess location, size, shape and/or function of the kidney.

== Management and Prognosis ==
Although limited, studies on children with ectopic kidneys show no adverse effects on blood pressure and kidney function during childhood follow-up visits. Nonetheless, it is recommended to periodically monitor patients from the time of diagnosis until adolescence. Follow-up visits are generally every 2 years and they include a kidney ultrasound, a blood pressure measurement, serum creatinine and a urinalysis to assess kidney function and screen for complications. During adulthood, an annual blood pressure check and urinalysis are sufficient, unless symptoms or complications arise.

== See also ==
- Crossed dystopia
