= Crossed renal ectopia =

Malposition of both kidneys on the same side of the spine

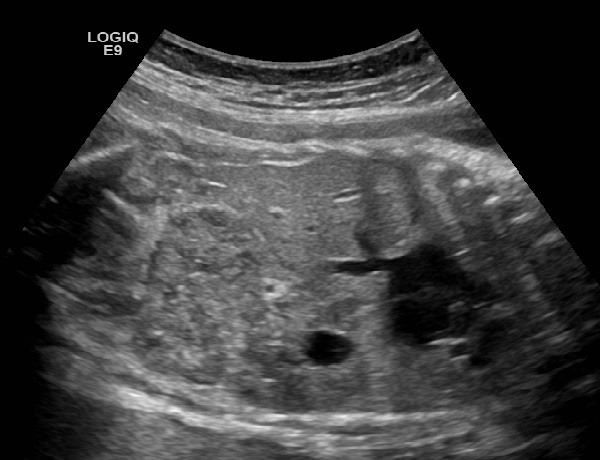
Ectopic crossed fused kidney in a fetus approx. 34 weeks

Crossed dystopia (also unilateral fusion cross fused renal ectopia) is a rare form of renal ectopia (kidney displacement) where both kidneys are on the same side of the spine. In many cases, the two kidneys are fused together, yet retain their own vessels and ureters. The ureter of the lower kidney crosses the midline to enter the bladder on the contralateral side. Both renal pelves can lie one above each other medial to the renal parenchyma (unilateral long kidney) or the pelvis of the crossed kidney faces laterally (unilateral S-shaped kidney). Urogram is diagnostic.

The anomaly can be diagnosed through ultrasound or urography, but surgical intervention is only necessary if there are other complications, such as tumors or pyelonephritis.
