= BMRST =

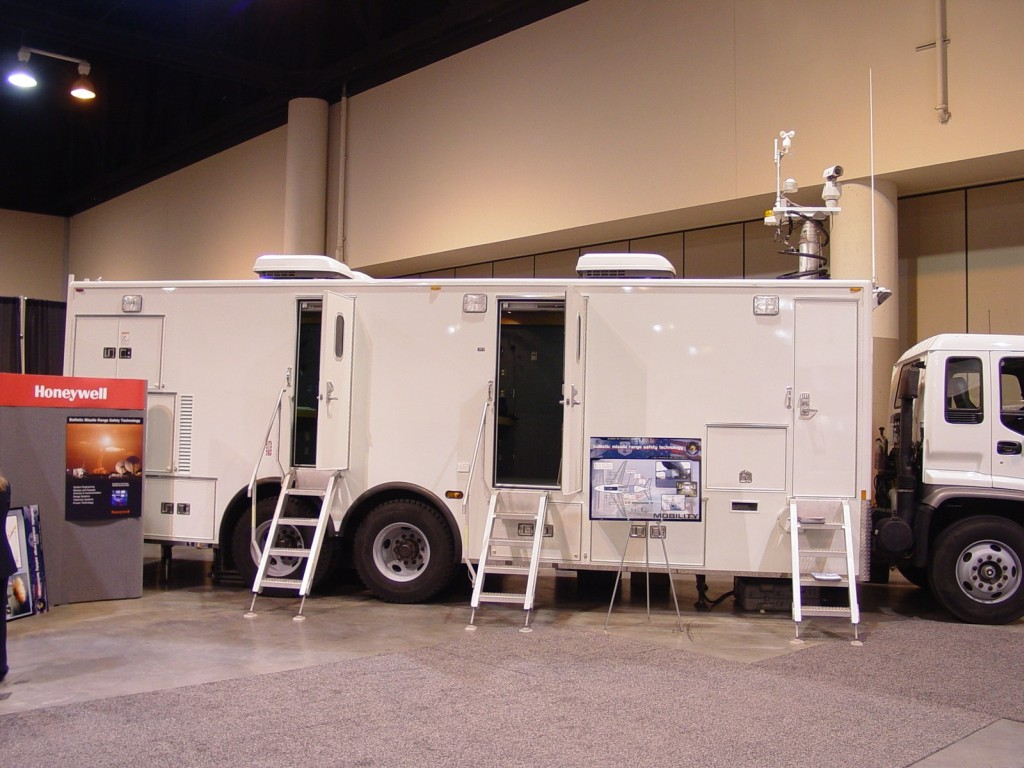
The BMRST Control System Truck on display at the Strategic Space Conference in Omaha Nebraska, October 2005

Ballistic Missile Range Safety Technology (BMRST) is a mobile system designed and built by Honeywell International in Clearwater Florida, to monitor and provide space-vehicle position data during launches. The BMRST system consists of a control center van and two trailer-mounted tracking antennas. All data processing and range safety displays are housed in the control center; the antennas are designed to receive data from launched rockets and space vehicles and transmit the information back to the control center. From the control center, the Range Safety Officer will also be able to assist in destroying an off-course rocket or launch vehicle for safety reasons.

The tracking antennas combine the ability to receive an S-band telemetry data signal with the ability to transmit high-power UHF Command Destruct tones. Each of the antenna systems consists of a 5.4-meter reflector, elevation over azimuth pedestal, and a specialized telemetry tracking/UHF feed.

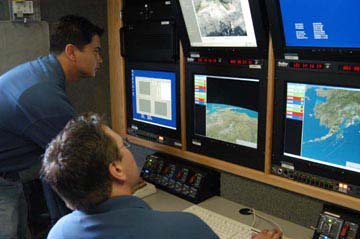
Honeywell technicians demonstrate the control system of the BMRST at the Honeywell plant in Clearwater, Fla.

The system is currently operated by the Florida Air National Guard at Cape Canaveral Air Force Station, Florida. The system is capable of being transported by land, sea and C-5 Galaxy, C-17 military cargo aircraft.

The BMRST system is similar in design to the Range Safety and Telemetry System (RSTS) being used at the Kodiak Launch Center in Alaska.

== See also ==
- BMRST Interior
- BMRST Video
- Safety at the Kodiak Launch Complex (RSTS)

== External links and sources ==
- Florida Air Guard Receives New Space-Launch Tracking System
- Honeywell Range Safety
- Honeywell To Provide Ballistic Missile Range Safety Technology System For The U.S. Air Force Rocket System Launch Program (October 2002)
- Contract from Honeywell Space Systems for Ballistic Missile Range Safety System
- Challenges in Acceptance/Licensing of a Mobile Ballistic Missile Range Safety Technology (BMRST) System (PDF File)
