= List of syndromes =

Syndromes

This is an alphabetically sorted list of medical syndromes.

== # ==
1. 1p36 deletion syndrome
2. 1q21.1 deletion syndrome
3. 1q21.1 duplication syndrome
4. 17q21.31 microdeletion syndrome
5. 22q11.2 distal deletion syndrome
6. 22q11.2 duplication syndrome
7. 22q13 deletion syndrome
8. 2p15-16.1 microdeletion syndrome
9. 2q37 deletion syndrome
10. 3-M syndrome
11. 3C syndrome
12. 3q29 microdeletion syndrome
13. 49,XXXXY
14. 4D syndrome
15. 8p23.1 duplication syndrome
16. 9q34 deletion syndrome

== A ==
1. Aagenaes syndrome
2. Aarskog–Scott syndrome
3. Aase syndrome
4. Abandoned child syndrome
5. ABCD syndrome
6. Abdallat–Davis–Farrage syndrome
7. Abderhalden–Kaufmann–Lignac syndrome
8. Abdominal compartment syndrome
9. Ablepharon macrostomia syndrome
10. Abruzzo–Erickson syndrome
11. Achard syndrome
12. Achard–Thiers syndrome
13. Ackerman syndrome
14. Acorea, microphthalmia and cataract syndrome
15. Acrocallosal syndrome
16. Acropectoral syndrome
17. Acro–dermato–ungual–lacrimal–tooth syndrome
18. Activation syndrome
19. Acute aortic syndrome
20. Acute brain syndrome
21. Acute chest syndrome
22. Acute coronary syndrome
23. Acute HME syndrome
24. Acute interstitial pneumonitis
25. Acute motor axonal neuropathy
26. Acute radiation syndrome
27. Acute respiratory distress syndrome
28. Acute retroviral syndrome
29. Adams–Nance syndrome
30. Adams–Oliver syndrome
31. Adams–Stokes syndrome
32. Adducted thumb syndrome
33. Adie syndrome
34. Adiposogenital dystrophy
35. Adult-onset immunodeficiency syndrome
36. Advanced sleep phase disorder
37. Aerotoxic syndrome
38. Afferent loop syndrome
39. Agricultural weed syndrome
40. Aicardi syndrome
41. Aicardi–Goutières syndrome
42. AIDS dysmorphic syndrome
43. Al-Raqad syndrome
44. Alagille syndrome
45. Albinism–deafness syndrome
46. Alcohol withdrawal syndrome
47. Alezzandrini syndrome
48. Alice in Wonderland syndrome
49. Alien hand syndrome
50. Allan–Herndon–Dudley syndrome
51. Allopurinol hypersensitivity syndrome
52. Alopecia contractures dwarfism intellectual disability syndrome
53. Alpha-thalassemia intellectual disability syndrome
54. Alport syndrome
55. Alström syndrome
56. Alvarez' syndrome
57. Amniotic band constriction
58. Amotivational syndrome
59. Amplified musculoskeletal pain syndromes
60. Andermann syndrome
61. Andersen–Tawil syndrome
62. Androgen insensitivity syndrome
63. Angelman syndrome
64. ANOTHER syndrome
65. Anterior cerebral artery syndrome
66. Anterior compartment syndrome
67. Anterior cutaneous nerve entrapment syndrome
68. Anterior interosseous syndrome
69. Anterior spinal artery syndrome
70. Anticonvulsant hypersensitivity syndrome
71. Antidepressant discontinuation syndrome
72. Antiphospholipid syndrome
73. Antisynthetase syndrome
74. Antley–Bixler syndrome
75. Anton–Babinski syndrome
76. Aortic arch syndrome
77. Aortocaval compression syndrome
78. Apert syndrome
79. Apparent mineralocorticoid excess syndrome
80. Arakawa's syndrome II
81. Arboleda–Tham syndrome
82. Ardalan–Shoja–Kiuru syndrome
83. AREDYLD syndrome
84. Aromatase excess syndrome
85. Arterial tortuosity syndrome
86. Arthrogryposis–renal dysfunction–cholestasis syndrome
87. Arts syndrome
88. Ascher's syndrome
89. Asherman's syndrome
90. Asperger syndrome
91. Asymmetric crying facies
92. Ataxia-pancytopenia syndrome
93. Ataxia-telangiectasia
94. Athletic heart syndrome
95. Athymhormic syndrome
96. ATR-16 syndrome
97. Atrophodermia vermiculata
98. Atypical hemolytic uremic syndrome
99. Austrian syndrome
100. Autoimmune disease
101. Autoimmune lymphoproliferative syndrome
102. Autoimmune polyendocrine syndrome type 1
103. Autoimmune polyendocrine syndrome type 2
104. Autoimmune polyendocrine syndrome type 3
105. Autoimmune polyendocrine syndrome
106. Autoinflammatory syndromes
107. Avellis syndrome
108. Axenfeld syndrome
109. Axial spondyloarthritis
110. Ayazi syndrome

== B ==
1. Babinski–Nageotte syndrome
2. Baboon syndrome
3. Baggio–Yoshinari syndrome
4. Bálint's syndrome
5. Baller–Gerold syndrome
6. Bamforth–Lazarus syndrome
7. Bangstad syndrome
8. Bannayan–Riley–Ruvalcaba syndrome
9. Banti's syndrome
10. Barakat syndrome
11. Barakat-Perenthaler syndrome
12. Bardet–Biedl syndrome
13. Bare lymphocyte syndrome type II
14. Bare lymphocyte syndrome
15. Barlow's syndrome
16. Barraquer–Simons syndrome
17. Bart syndrome
18. Bartter syndrome
19. Bart–Pumphrey syndrome
20. Bassen-Kornzweig syndrome
21. Battered person syndrome
22. Bazex–Dupré–Christol syndrome
23. Beare–Stevenson cutis gyrata syndrome
24. Beckwith–Wiedemann syndrome
25. Behcet's syndrome
26. Behr syndrome
27. Benedikt syndrome
28. Benign fasciculation syndrome
29. Benjamin syndrome
30. Benzodiazepine withdrawal syndrome
31. Berdon syndrome
32. Berk–Tabatznik syndrome
33. Bernard–Soulier syndrome
34. Berserk llama syndrome
35. Bhaskar–Jagannathan syndrome
36. Biemond syndrome
37. Bilious vomiting syndrome
38. Binder's syndrome
39. Bing–Neel syndrome
40. Birt–Hogg–Dubé syndrome
41. Björnstad syndrome
42. Black dog syndrome
43. Bland-White-Garland syndrome
44. Blau syndrome
45. Blepharophimosis, ptosis, epicanthus inversus syndrome
46. Blind loop syndrome
47. Bloom syndrome
48. Blount's disease
49. Blue baby syndrome
50. Blue diaper syndrome
51. Blue rubber bleb nevus syndrome
52. Blue toe syndrome
53. Bobble-head doll syndrome
54. Body fat redistribution syndrome
55. Boerhaave syndrome
56. Bogart–Bacall syndrome
57. Bohring–Opitz syndrome
58. Bonnet–Dechaume–Blanc syndrome
59. Börjeson-Forssman-Lehmann syndrome
60. Bowen–Conradi syndrome
61. Brachycephalic airway obstructive syndrome
62. Brainstem stroke syndrome
63. Branchio-oculo-facial syndrome
64. Branchio-oto-renal syndrome
65. Bromism
66. Brown's syndrome
67. Brown-Séquard syndrome
68. Brown–Vialetto–Van Laere syndrome
69. Bruck syndrome
70. Brugada syndrome
71. Brunner syndrome
72. Budd–Chiari syndrome
73. Burning feet syndrome
74. Burning mouth syndrome
75. Burnside–Butler syndrome
76. Buschke–Ollendorff syndrome

== C ==
1. CACNA1C-related disorders
2. CADASIL
3. Camera-Marugo-Cohen syndrome
4. CAMFAK syndrome
5. Camptodactyly-arthropathy-coxa vara-pericarditis syndrome
6. Cancer syndrome
7. Cancer-related fatigue
8. CANDLE syndrome
9. Canine epileptoid cramping syndrome
10. Cannabinoid hyperemesis syndrome (CHS)
11. Cantú syndrome
12. Capgras delusion
13. Capgras syndrome
14. Capillary leak syndrome
15. Caplan's syndrome
16. Carcinoid syndrome
17. Cardiac syndrome X
18. Cardiofaciocutaneous syndrome
19. Cardiorenal syndrome
20. Cardiovascular syndrome
21. Carney complex
22. Caroli disease
23. Carpal tunnel syndrome
24. Carpenter syndrome
25. Cat eye syndrome
26. Cataract-microcornea syndrome
27. Catastrophic antiphospholipid syndrome
28. Catel–Manzke syndrome
29. Cauda equina syndrome
30. Caudal regression syndrome
31. CDK13-related disorder
32. Celebrity worship syndrome
33. Central centrifugal cicatricial alopecia
34. Central cord syndrome
35. Central nervous system syndrome
36. Central pain syndrome
37. Centurion syndrome
38. Cerebellar cognitive affective syndrome
39. Cerebellar stroke syndrome
40. Cerebellopontine angle syndrome
41. Cerebral salt-wasting syndrome
42. Cervicocranial syndrome
43. Charcot–Marie–Tooth disease
44. CHARGE syndrome
45. Charles Bonnet syndrome
46. Chiari–Frommel syndrome
47. Chiasmal syndrome
48. Chilaiditi syndrome
49. Child sexual abuse accommodation syndrome
50. CHILD syndrome
51. childhood myelodysplastic syndrome
52. Childhood tumor syndrome
53. Chinese Restaurant Syndrome
54. Chromosomal deletion syndrome
55. Chromosome 5q deletion syndrome
56. Chronic fatigue syndrome
57. Chronic functional abdominal pain
58. Chronic infantile neurologic cutaneous and articular syndrome
59. Chronic Lyme disease
60. Chronic prostatitis/chronic pelvic pain syndrome
61. Churg–Strauss syndrome
62. Chédiak–Higashi syndrome
63. Claude's syndrome
64. Clinically isolated syndrome
65. CLOVES syndrome
66. COACH syndrome
67. Cobb syndrome
68. Cockayne syndrome
69. Coffin–Lowry syndrome
70. Coffin–Siris syndrome
71. Cogan syndrome
72. Cohen syndrome
73. Compartment syndrome
74. Complement deficiency
75. Complete androgen insensitivity syndrome
76. Complex regional pain syndrome
77. Computer vision syndrome
78. Conductive deafness-ptosis-skeletal anomalies syndrome
79. Congenital bilateral perisylvian syndrome
80. Congenital contractural arachnodactyly
81. Congenital generalized lipodystrophy
82. Congenital insensitivity to pain
83. Congenital myasthenic syndrome
84. Congenital nephrotic syndrome
85. Congenital rubella syndrome
86. Conn's syndrome
87. Conorenal syndrome
88. Conradi–Hünermann syndrome
89. Constriction ring syndrome
90. Contiguous gene syndrome
91. Conus medullaris syndrome
92. Cooks syndrome
93. Cord colitis syndrome
94. Corneal-cerebellar syndrome
95. Corneal dystrophy-perceptive deafness syndrome
96. Cornelia de Lange Syndrome
97. Corneodermatoosseous syndrome
98. Coronary steal
99. Costeff syndrome
100. Costello syndrome
101. Cotard delusion
102. Cotard's Syndrome
103. Cotton fever
104. Cowden syndrome
105. Cracked tooth syndrome
106. Cramp fasciculation syndrome
107. Crandall syndrome
108. Craniosynostosis–anal anomalies–porokeratosis syndrome
109. Cranio-lenticulo-sutural dysplasia
110. CREST syndrome
111. Cri du chat
112. Crigler–Najjar syndrome
113. Crome syndrome
114. Cronkhite–Canada syndrome
115. Cross syndrome
116. Crouzon syndrome
117. Crouzonodermoskeletal syndrome
118. Crush syndrome
119. Cruveilhier-Baumgarten syndrome
120. Cryopyrin-associated periodic syndrome
121. Cryptorchidism-arachnodactyly-intellectual disability syndrome
122. Cuboid syndrome
123. Currarino syndrome
124. Cushing's syndrome
125. Cyclic vomiting syndrome
126. Cytokine release syndrome

== D ==
1. Da Costa's syndrome
2. Daentl Townsend Siegel syndrome
3. Dahlberg Borer Newcomer syndrome
4. Dandy–Walker syndrome
5. De Barsy syndrome
6. de Clérambault's syndrome
7. De Quervain syndrome
8. De Winter syndrome
9. Dead arm syndrome
10. Deficiency of the interleukin-1–receptor antagonist
11. Degenerative disc disease
12. Dejerine–Roussy syndrome
13. Delayed sleep phase disorder
14. Delusional misidentification syndrome
15. Delusional parasitosis
16. Dennie–Marfan syndrome
17. Dentomandibular sensorimotor dysfunction
18. Denys–Drash syndrome
19. DeSanctis–Cacchione syndrome
20. Descending perineum syndrome
21. Diabetic stiff hand syndrome
22. Dialysis disequilibrium syndrome
23. Diencephalic syndrome
24. Diffuse infiltrative lymphocytosis syndrome
25. DiGeorge syndrome
26. Diogenes syndrome
27. Diploid-triploid mosaicism
28. Disconnection syndrome
29. Distal 18q-
30. Distal intestinal obstruction syndrome
31. Distal trisomy 10q
32. Doege–Potter syndrome
33. Domestication syndrome
34. Donnai–Barrow syndrome
35. Donohue syndrome
36. DOOR syndrome
37. Dopamine dysregulation syndrome
38. Down syndrome
39. Dravet syndrome
40. Dressler syndrome
41. Drug reaction with eosinophilia and systemic symptoms
42. Dry eye syndrome
43. Duane syndrome
44. Duane-radial ray syndrome
45. Dubin–Johnson syndrome
46. Dubowitz syndrome
47. Dumping syndrome
48. Dysexecutive syndrome
49. Dyskeratosis congenita
50. Dysplastic nevus syndrome

== E ==
1. Eagle syndrome
2. Ectrodactyly–ectodermal dysplasia–cleft syndrome
3. Edwards syndrome
4. EEM syndrome
5. Egg drop syndrome
6. Ehlers–Danlos syndrome
7. Eiken syndrome
8. Einstein syndrome
9. Eisenmenger's syndrome
10. Eldomery-Sutton syndrome
11. Elejalde syndrome
12. Ellis–van Creveld syndrome
13. Emanuel syndrome
14. Empty nest syndrome
15. Empty nose syndrome
16. Empty sella syndrome
17. Enlarged vestibular aqueduct syndrome
18. Environmental dependency syndrome
19. Eosinophilia–myalgia syndrome
20. Eosinophilic cellulitis
21. Epidermal nevus syndrome
22. Epilepsy syndromes
23. Episodic dyscontrol syndrome
24. Epizootic ulcerative syndrome
25. Erdheim–Chester disease
26. Erondu–Cymet syndrome
27. Estrogen insensitivity syndrome
28. Euthyroid sick syndrome
29. Evans syndrome
30. Excess ovarian androgen release syndrome
31. Exploding head syndrome
32. Extrapyramidal symptoms

== F ==
1. FACES syndrome
2. Facet syndrome
3. Facial Onset Sensory Motor Neuropathy syndrome
4. Fahr's syndrome
5. Failed back syndrome
6. Familial cold autoinflammatory syndrome
7. Familial Mediterranean fever
8. Familial partial lipodystrophy
9. Familial Adenomatous Polyposis
10. Fanconi syndrome
11. Favre–Racouchot syndrome
12. Febrile infection-related epilepsy syndrome
13. Febrile neutrophilic dermatosis
14. Fechtner syndrome
15. Feingold syndrome
16. Feline hyperesthesia syndrome
17. Felty's syndrome
18. Femur fibula ulna syndrome
19. Fetal alcohol syndrome
20. Fetal hydantoin syndrome
21. Fetal trimethadione syndrome
22. Fetal valproate syndrome
23. Fetal warfarin syndrome
24. FG syndrome
25. Fibrinolysis syndrome
26. Fibromyalgia syndrome
27. Fibromyalgia
28. First arch syndrome
29. Fish acute toxicity syndrome
30. Fitz-Hugh–Curtis syndrome
31. Fitzsimmons–Guilbert syndrome
32. Flammer syndrome
33. Fleischer's syndrome
34. Floating–Harbor syndrome
35. Floppy eyelid syndrome
36. Floppy trunk syndrome
37. Florid cutaneous papillomatosis
38. Flynn–Aird syndrome
39. Foal immunodeficiency syndrome
40. Foerster's syndrome
41. Foix–Alajouanine syndrome
42. Foix–Chavany–Marie syndrome
43. Folie à deux
44. Follicle-stimulating hormone insensitivity
45. Forbes-Albright syndrome
46. Foreign accent syndrome
47. Foster–Kennedy syndrome
48. Fountain syndrome
49. Foville's syndrome
50. Fragile X syndrome
51. Fragile X-associated tremor/ataxia syndrome
52. Franceschetti–Klein syndrome
53. Frank–ter Haar syndrome
54. Fraser syndrome
55. Frasier syndrome
56. Freeman–Sheldon syndrome
57. Frey's syndrome
58. Froin's syndrome
59. Fryns syndrome
60. Functional somatic syndrome

== G ==
1. Gaisböck syndrome
2. Galloway Mowat syndrome
3. GAPO syndrome
4. Gardner's syndrome
5. Gastric outlet obstruction
6. Gastrocutaneous syndrome
7. Gastrointestinal syndrome
8. Genitopatellar syndrome
9. Gerstmann syndrome
10. Gerstmann–Sträussler–Scheinker syndrome
11. Geschwind syndrome
12. Gianotti–Crosti syndrome
13. Giant platelet disorder
14. Gilbert's syndrome
15. Gillespie syndrome
16. Gitelman syndrome
17. Gleich's syndrome
18. GMS syndrome
19. Goldberg–Shprintzen syndrome
20. Goldenhar syndrome
21. Gomez and López-Hernández syndrome
22. Gonadotropin insensitivity
23. Gonadotropin-releasing hormone insensitivity
24. Goodpasture syndrome
25. Gordon syndrome
26. Gougerot–Blum syndrome
27. Gourmand syndrome
28. Gouverneur's syndrome
29. GRACILE syndrome
30. Graham-Little syndrome
31. Gray baby syndrome
32. Gray platelet syndrome
33. Greater trochanteric pain syndrome
34. Green nail syndrome
35. Greig cephalopolysyndactyly syndrome
36. Grinspan's syndrome
37. Griscelli syndrome type 2
38. Griscelli syndrome type 3
39. Griscelli syndrome
40. Grisel's syndrome
41. Growing teratoma syndrome
42. Guillain–Barré syndrome
43. Gulf War syndrome

== H ==
1. Haber syndrome
2. Hagemoser–Weinstein–Bresnick syndrome
3. Haglund's syndrome
4. Haim–Munk syndrome
5. Hajdu–Cheney syndrome
6. Halal syndrome
7. Hallermann–Streiff syndrome
8. Hamman's syndrome
9. Hamman-Rich syndrome
10. Hand-foot-genital syndrome
11. Handigodu syndrome
12. Hanhart syndrome
13. Hantavirus pulmonary syndrome
14. Hapnes Boman Skeie syndrome
15. Harlequin syndrome
16. Harris platelet syndrome
17. Harrison syndrome
18. Havana syndrome
19. Hay–Wells syndrome
20. Hearing loss with craniofacial syndromes
21. HEC syndrome
22. Heel pad syndrome
23. Heel spur syndrome
24. Heerfordt syndrome
25. HELLP syndrome
26. Hemihyperplasia–multiple lipomatosis syndrome
27. Hemimegalencephaly
28. Hemispatial neglect
29. Hemoglobin Lepore syndrome
30. Hemolytic-uremic syndrome
31. Hennekam syndrome
32. Hepatopulmonary syndrome
33. Hepatorenal syndrome
34. Hereditary breast–ovarian cancer syndrome
35. Hereditary hyperbilirubinemia
36. Hereditary leiomyomatosis and renal cell cancer syndrome
37. Hereditary neuralgic amyotrophy
38. Hereditary nonpolyposis colorectal cancer
39. Hermansky–Pudlak syndrome
40. Herlyn–Werner–Wunderlich syndrome
41. Hero syndrome
42. Heyde's syndrome
43. HHH syndrome
44. High-rise syndrome
45. HIV/AIDS
46. Holiday heart syndrome
47. Holt–Oram syndrome
48. Horn-Kolb syndrome
49. Horner's syndrome
50. Howel–Evans syndrome
51. Hoyeraal-Hreidarsson syndrome
52. Ho–Kaufman–Mcalister syndrome
53. Hughes–Stovin syndrome
54. Hunan hand syndrome
55. Hunter syndrome
56. Huntington's disease-like syndrome
57. HUPRA syndrome
58. Hurler syndrome
59. Hurler–Scheie syndrome
60. Hutchinson–Gilford progeria syndrome
61. Hydrolethalus syndrome
62. Hyper IgM syndrome
63. Hyper-IgD syndrome
64. Hyper-IgM syndrome type 1
65. Hyper-IgM syndrome type 2
66. Hyper-IgM syndrome type 3
67. Hyper-IgM syndrome type 4
68. Hyper-IgM syndrome type 5
69. Hyperimmunoglobulin D syndrome
70. Hyperimmunoglobulin E syndrome
71. Hypermobility syndrome
72. Hyperosmolar syndrome
73. Hyperprolactinaemia
74. Hyperprolactinemic SAHA syndrome
75. Hypertension and brachydactyly syndrome
76. Hypertrichosis cubiti
77. Hyperventilation syndrome
78. Hyperviscosity syndrome
79. Hypohidrotic ectodermal dysplasia
80. Hypoplastic left heart syndrome
81. Hypoplastic right heart syndrome
82. Hypotonia
83. Hypotrichosis–acro-osteolysis–onychogryphosis–palmoplantar keratoderma–periodontitis syndrome
84. Hypotrichosis–lymphedema–telangiectasia syndrome
85. Hystrix-like ichthyosis–deafness syndrome

== I ==
1. Ichthyosis follicularis with alopecia and photophobia syndrome
2. Ichthyosis prematurity syndrome
3. Idiopathic pneumonia syndrome
4. Idiopathic postprandial syndrome
5. Idiopathic pure sudomotor failure
6. Iliotibial band syndrome
7. Imerslund–Gräsbeck syndrome
8. Immersion foot syndromes
9. Immune reconstitution inflammatory syndrome
10. Immunodeficiency–centromeric instability–facial anomalies syndrome
11. Impingement syndrome
12. Imposter syndrome
13. Incontinentia pigmenti
14. Infant respiratory distress syndrome
15. Inferior vena cava syndrome
16. Influenza-like illness
17. Institutional syndrome
18. Intersection syndrome
19. Interstitial cystitis
20. Intracranial hypertension syndrome
21. Intraoperative floppy iris syndrome
22. IPEX syndrome
23. Iridocorneal endothelial syndrome
24. Irlen syndrome
25. Irregular sleep–wake rhythm
26. irritable bladder syndrome
27. Irritable bowel syndrome
28. Irritable male syndrome
29. Irukandji syndrome
30. Irvine–Gass syndrome

== J ==
1. Jackson–Weiss syndrome
2. Jacobsen syndrome
3. Jaffe–Campanacci syndrome
4. Jalili syndrome
5. Jansen's metaphyseal chondrodysplasia
6. Janz syndrome
7. Jeavons syndrome
8. Jerusalem syndrome
9. Jervell and Lange-Nielsen syndrome
10. Johanson–Blizzard syndrome
11. Johnson–McMillin syndrome
12. Johnson–Munson syndrome
13. Joubert syndrome
14. Juberg-Hellman syndrome
15. Jugular foramen syndrome
16. Juvenile polyposis syndrome

== K ==
1. Kabuki syndrome
2. Kallmann syndrome
3. Kapur–Toriello syndrome
4. Karak syndrome
5. Karsch-Neugebauer syndrome
6. Kartagener's syndrome
7. Kasabach–Merritt syndrome
8. Katz syndrome
9. Kaufman oculocerebrofacial syndrome
10. Kearns–Sayre syndrome
11. Keppen–Lubinsky syndrome
12. Keratitis–ichthyosis–deafness syndrome
13. Keratosis linearis with ichthyosis congenita and sclerosing keratoderma syndrome
14. Keutel syndrome
15. Khyâl cap
16. Kimmelstiel-Wilson syndrome
17. Kindler syndrome
18. King–Kopetzky syndrome
19. Kleine–Levin syndrome
20. Klinefelter syndrome
21. Klippel–Feil syndrome
22. Klippel–Trénaunay syndrome
23. Klüver–Bucy syndrome
24. Knobloch syndrome
25. Kocher–Debre–Semelaigne syndrome
26. Kohlschütter-Tönz syndrome
27. König's syndrome
28. Korsakoff's syndrome
29. Kostmann syndrome
30. Kounis syndrome
31. Kowarski syndrome
32. Kozlowski-Krajewska syndrome
33. Kufor–Rakeb syndrome

== L ==
1. Lachiewicz–Sibley syndrome
2. Lacunar Stroke Syndrome
3. Lambert–Eaton myasthenic syndrome
4. Landau–Kleffner syndrome
5. Langer–Giedion syndrome
6. Laron syndrome
7. Larsen syndrome
8. Laryngoonychocutaneous syndrome
9. Lateral medullary syndrome
10. Lateral meningocele syndrome
11. Lateral pontine syndrome
12. Laugier–Hunziker syndrome
13. Laurence–Moon syndrome
14. Lavender foal syndrome
15. Lawrence–Seip syndrome
16. Lazarus syndrome
17. Leaky gut syndrome
18. Legg–Calvé–Perthes disease
19. Legius syndrome
20. Leiner's disease
21. Lelis syndrome
22. Lemierre's syndrome
23. Lennox–Gastaut syndrome
24. Lenz microphthalmia syndrome
25. Lenz–Majewski syndrome
26. Leriche's syndrome
27. Leschke syndrome
28. Lesch–Nyhan syndrome
29. Lethal congenital contracture syndrome
30. Lethal white syndrome
31. Leukotriene receptor antagonist-associated Churg–Strauss syndrome
32. Levator ani syndrome
33. Leydig cell hypoplasia
34. Liddle's syndrome
35. Liebenberg syndrome
36. LIG4 syndrome
37. Lima syndrome
38. Limb girdle syndrome
39. Limber tail syndrome
40. Limb–mammary syndrome
41. Linburg–Comstock syndrome
42. Li–Fraumeni syndrome
43. Locked-in syndrome
44. Locomotive syndrome
45. Loeys–Dietz syndrome
46. Löffler's syndrome
47. Löfgren syndrome
48. Loin pain hematuria syndrome
49. Long COVID
50. Long face syndrome
51. Long QT syndrome
52. Loose anagen syndrome
53. Lown–Ganong–Levine syndrome
54. Lowry–MacLean syndrome
55. Lucey–Driscoll syndrome
56. Lujan–Fryns syndrome
57. Lutembacher's syndrome
58. Lymphangitis carcinomatosa
59. Lymphedema–distichiasis syndrome
60. Lynch syndrome
61. Lyngstadaas syndrome

== M ==
1. M74 syndrome
2. Macrocephaly-capillary malformation
3. Macrophage activation syndrome
4. Maffucci syndrome
5. Majeed syndrome
6. Majewski's polydactyly syndrome
7. Mal de debarquement
8. Malformative syndrome
9. Mallory–Weiss syndrome
10. Malnutrition–inflammation complex
11. Malouf syndrome
12. Malpuech facial clefting syndrome
13. Management of chronic headaches
14. Manning criteria
15. Marchiafava–Bignami disease
16. Marden–Walker syndrome
17. Mare reproductive loss syndrome
18. Marfan syndrome
19. Marfanoid–progeroid–lipodystrophy syndrome
20. Marie Antoinette syndrome
21. Marinesco–Sjögren syndrome
22. Maroteaux–Lamy syndrome
23. Marshall syndrome
24. Marshall–Smith syndrome
25. Marshall–White syndrome
26. MASA syndrome
27. Mast cell activation syndrome
28. Mauriac syndrome
29. Mayer–Rokitansky–Küster–Hauser syndrome
30. May–Thurner syndrome
31. May–White syndrome
32. McArdle syndrome
33. McCune–Albright syndrome
34. McCusick syndrome
35. McGillivray syndrome
36. McKittrick–Wheelock syndrome
37. McKusick–Kaufman syndrome
38. McLeod syndrome
39. MDP syndrome
40. Mean world syndrome
41. Meckel syndrome
42. Meconium aspiration syndrome
43. Medial medullary syndrome
44. Medial pontine syndrome
45. Median arcuate ligament syndrome
46. Medical students' disease
47. MEDNIK syndrome
48. Megavitamin-B_{6} syndrome
49. Meige's syndrome
50. Meigs' syndrome
51. MELAS syndrome
52. Melkersson–Rosenthal syndrome
53. Melnick–Needles syndrome
54. Memory distrust syndrome
55. Mendelson's syndrome
56. Ménière's disease
57. Menkes disease
58. MERRF syndrome
59. Metabolic syndrome
60. Michelin tire baby syndrome
61. Michels Caskey syndrome
62. Michels syndrome
63. Mickleson syndrome
64. Micro syndrome
65. Microdeletion syndrome
66. Microphthalmia–dermal aplasia–sclerocornea syndrome
67. Middle cerebral artery syndrome
68. Middle child syndrome
69. Middle East respiratory syndrome
70. Mikulicz syndrome
71. Mild androgen insensitivity syndrome
72. Milk-alkali syndrome
73. Millard–Gubler syndrome
74. Miller Fisher syndrome
75. Miller syndrome
76. Miller–Dieker syndrome
77. Milroy's disease
78. Milwaukee shoulder syndrome
79. Mirhosseini–Holmes–Walton syndrome
80. Mirizzi's syndrome
81. Mirror syndrome
82. Mismatch repair cancer syndrome
83. Mitochondrial DNA depletion syndrome
84. Mitochondrial neurogastrointestinal encephalopathy syndrome
85. Mitral valve prolapse
86. Mittelschmerz
87. Möbius syndrome
88. Mohr–Tranebjærg syndrome
89. MOMO syndrome
90. Monofixation syndrome
91. MonoMAC
92. Morgagni Stewart Morel syndrome
93. MORM syndrome
94. Morquio syndrome
95. Morvan's syndrome
96. Mouth and genital ulcers with inflamed cartilage syndrome
97. Mowat–Wilson syndrome
98. Moyamoya disease
99. Moynahan syndrome
100. Muckle–Wells syndrome
101. Muenke syndrome
102. Muir–Torre syndrome
103. Mukamel syndrome
104. Müllerian agenesis
105. Multiple endocrine neoplasia type 1
106. Multiple endocrine neoplasia type 2
107. Multiple evanescent white dot syndrome
108. Multiple hamartoma syndrome
109. Multiple organ dysfunction syndrome
110. Multiple pterygium syndrome
111. Munchausen syndrome
112. Mungan syndrome
113. Musical ear syndrome
114. Mycosis fungoides
115. Myelodysplastic syndrome
116. Myoclonic astatic epilepsy
117. Myofascial pain syndrome
118. Myomatous erythrocytosis syndrome

== N ==
1. Nablus mask-like facial syndrome
2. Naegeli–Franceschetti–Jadassohn syndrome
3. Nager acrofacial dysostosis
4. Nail–patella syndrome
5. Nakajo syndrome
6. Nance–Horan syndrome
7. Napoleonist Syndrome
8. Nasodigitoacoustic syndrome
9. Naxos syndrome
10. Nelson's syndrome
11. NEMO deficiency syndrome
12. Neonatal ichthyosis–sclerosing cholangitis syndrome
13. Nephritic syndrome
14. Nephrotic syndrome
15. Nerve compression syndrome
16. Netherton syndrome
17. Neu–Laxova syndrome
18. Neuro-cardio-facial-cutaneous syndromes
19. Neurofibromatosis type I
20. Neuroleptic malignant syndrome
21. Neuroleptic-Induced Deficit Syndrome
22. Neutrophil immunodeficiency syndrome
23. Nevo syndrome
24. Nevoid basal-cell carcinoma syndrome
25. Nezelof syndrome
26. Nicolaides–Baraitser syndrome
27. Nicolau–Balus syndrome
28. Night eating syndrome
29. Nijmegen breakage syndrome
30. Njølstad syndrome
31. Nodding disease
32. Non-24-hour sleep–wake disorder
33. Noonan syndrome with multiple lentigines
34. Noonan syndrome
35. Norman–Roberts syndrome
36. Northern epilepsy syndrome
37. Nutcracker syndrome

== O ==
1. Occipital horn syndrome
2. Ocular ischemic syndrome
3. Oculo-respiratory syndrome
4. Oculoauricular syndrome
5. Oculocerebrocutaneous syndrome
6. Oculocerebrorenal syndrome
7. Oculofaciocardiodental syndrome
8. Oculomucocutaneous syndrome
9. Odontoma dysphagia syndrome
10. Odonto-tricho-ungual-digital-palmar syndrome
11. OHVIRA (Obstructed Hemivagina and Ipsilateral Renal Anomaly)
12. Ogden Syndrome
13. Ogilvie syndrome
14. Ohtahara syndrome
15. Olfactory reference syndrome
16. Oliver–McFarlane syndrome
17. Omenn syndrome
18. One and a half syndrome
19. Oneiroid syndrome
20. Opitz G/BBB Syndrome
21. Opsoclonus myoclonus syndrome
22. Oral allergy syndrome
23. Oral mite anaphylaxis
24. Oral-facial-digital syndrome
25. Orbital apex syndrome
26. Organic brain syndrome
27. Organic dust toxic syndrome
28. Orofaciodigital syndrome 1
29. Ortner's syndrome
30. OSLAM syndrome
31. Osler–Weber–Rendu disease
32. Otodental syndrome
33. Otofacial syndrome
34. Ovarian hyperstimulation syndrome
35. Ovarian vein syndrome
36. Overgrowth syndrome
37. Overlap syndrome

== P ==
1. Pacak–Zhuang syndrome
2. Pacemaker syndrome
3. Painful bruising syndrome
4. Pallister–Hall syndrome
5. Pallister–Killian syndrome
6. Panayiotopoulos syndrome
7. Pancoast tumor
8. Pantothenate kinase-associated neurodegeneration
9. PAPA syndrome
10. Papillon–Lefèvre syndrome
11. Papillorenal syndrome
12. Papular purpuric gloves and socks syndrome
13. Paraneoplastic acrokeratosis
14. Paraneoplastic cerebellar degeneration
15. Paraneoplastic syndrome
16. Parental alienation syndrome
17. Parinaud's oculoglandular syndrome
18. Parinaud's syndrome
19. Paris-Trousseau syndrome
20. Parkes Weber syndrome
21. Parkinson plus syndrome
22. Paroxysmal hand hematoma
23. Paroxysmal tachycardia
24. Parry–Romberg syndrome
25. Parsonage–Turner syndrome
26. Partial androgen insensitivity syndrome
27. Pashayan syndrome
28. Patau syndrome
29. Patellar subluxation syndrome
30. Patellofemoral pain syndrome
31. Patterson syndrome
32. Pearson syndrome
33. PANDAS
34. Peeling skin syndrome
35. PEHO syndrome
36. Pellegrini–Stieda syndrome
37. Pelvic congestion syndrome
38. Pelvic pain
39. Pemphigus erythematosus
40. Pendred syndrome
41. Penile Artery Shunt Syndrome
42. Pentalogy of Cantrell
43. Periodic fever syndrome
44. Periodic fever, aphthous stomatitis, pharyngitis and adenitis
45. Perisylvian syndrome
46. Perlman syndrome
47. Persistent adrenarche syndrome
48. Persistent genital arousal disorder
49. Persistent Müllerian duct syndrome
50. Pervasive refusal syndrome
51. Peters-plus syndrome
52. Peutz–Jeghers syndrome
53. Pfeiffer syndrome
54. Phantom eye syndrome
55. Phantom limb
56. Phantom vibration syndrome
57. Phelan-McDermid Syndrome
58. Pickwickian syndrome
59. Pigment dispersion syndrome
60. Pigmented hairy epidermal nevus syndrome
61. Pilotto syndrome
62. Piriformis syndrome
63. Pitt–Hopkins syndrome
64. Plica syndrome
65. Plummer–Vinson syndrome
66. POEMS syndrome
67. Poland syndrome
68. Polar T3 syndrome
69. Polio-like syndrome
70. Polyendocrine metabolic ovarian syndrome
71. Popliteal artery entrapment syndrome
72. Popliteal pterygium syndrome
73. Porcine stress syndrome
74. Pork–cat syndrome
75. Post-micturition convulsion syndrome
76. Post-nasal drip syndrome
77. Post-traumatic stress syndrome
78. Post-acute-withdrawal syndrome
79. Post-concussion syndrome
80. Post-Ebola virus syndrome
81. Post-intensive care syndrome
82. Post-maturity syndrome
83. Post-polio syndrome
84. Post-thrombotic syndrome
85. Post-vasectomy pain syndrome
86. Postcardiotomy syndrome
87. Postcholecystectomy syndrome
88. Posterior cerebral artery syndrome
89. Posterior cord syndrome
90. Posterior rami syndrome
91. Posterior reversible encephalopathy syndrome
92. Postgastrectomy syndromes
93. Postorgasmic illness syndrome
94. Postperfusion syndrome
95. Postpericardiotomy syndrome
96. Postural orthostatic tachycardia syndrome
97. Potocki–Lupski syndrome
98. Potocki–Shaffer syndrome
99. Potter sequence
100. Prader–Willi syndrome
101. Pre-excitation syndrome
102. Precordial catch syndrome
103. Premenstrual syndrome
104. Presumed ocular histoplasmosis syndrome
105. Pretzel syndrome
106. Primary pigmented nodular adrenocortical disease
107. Primrose syndrome
108. Progeroid syndromes
109. Progressive supranuclear palsy
110. Prolonged grief disorder
111. Pronator teres syndrome
112. Propofol infusion syndrome
113. Proteus syndrome
114. Proteus-like syndrome
115. Prune belly syndrome
116. Pseudo-Cushing's syndrome
117. Pseudodementia
118. Pseudoexfoliation syndrome
119. Psychoorganic syndrome
120. Puer aeternus
121. Pulmonary-renal syndrome
122. Purple glove syndrome
123. Purple urine bag syndrome

== QR ==
1. Qazi–Markouizos syndrome
2. Quadrilateral space syndrome
3. Queen bee syndrome
4. Rabbit syndrome
5. Rabson–Mendenhall syndrome
6. Radial tunnel syndrome
7. Rage syndrome
8. Raghib syndrome
9. Raine syndrome
10. Ramos-Arroyo syndrome
11. Ramsay Hunt syndrome type 1
12. Ramsay Hunt syndrome type 2
13. Ramsay Hunt syndrome
14. RAPADILINO syndrome
15. Rape trauma syndrome
16. Rapp–Hodgkin syndrome
17. Rapunzel syndrome
18. Rasmussen syndrome
19. RASopathy
20. Raymond Céstan syndrome
21. Raynaud syndrome
22. Red ear syndrome
23. Red man syndrome (Drug eruption)
24. Refeeding syndrome
25. Reactive arthritis
26. Renal dysplasia-limb defects syndrome
27. Renfield syndrome
28. Renpenning's syndrome
29. Restless legs syndrome
30. Restrictive dermopathy
31. Retinoic acid syndrome
32. Retirement syndrome
33. Rett syndrome
34. Reversible cerebral vasoconstriction syndrome
35. Revesz syndrome
36. Reye syndrome
37. Reynolds syndrome
38. Reynolds' pentad
39. Rh deficiency syndrome
40. Riddoch syndrome
41. Right middle lobe syndrome
42. Riley-Day Syndrome
43. Riley–Day syndrome
44. Ring chromosome 14 syndrome
45. Ring chromosome 20 syndrome
46. Roberts syndrome
47. Robinow syndrome
48. Rochon-Duvigneaud's syndrome
49. Roemheld syndrome
50. ROHHAD
51. Romano–Ward syndrome
52. Rombo syndrome
53. Rosenthal syndrome
54. Rosenthal–Kloepfer syndrome
55. Ross' syndrome
56. Rosselli–Gulienetti syndrome
57. Rothmund–Thomson syndrome
58. Rotor syndrome
59. Roussy–Lévy syndrome
60. Rubinstein–Taybi syndrome
61. Rud syndrome
62. Rudiger syndrome
63. Rumination syndrome
64. Runting-stunting syndrome in broilers
65. Ruzicka Goerz Anton syndrome

== S ==
1. Saal Bulas syndrome
2. Saal Greenstein syndrome
3. Sabinas brittle hair syndrome
4. Sack–Barabas syndrome
5. SACRAL syndrome
6. Saethre–Chotzen syndrome
7. SAHA syndrome
8. Sakati–Nyhan–Tisdale syndrome
9. Salt water aspiration syndrome
10. Sandifer syndrome
11. Sandestig–Stefanova syndrome
12. Sanfilippo syndrome
13. Sanjad-Sakati syndrome
14. SAPHO syndrome
15. Satoyoshi syndrome
16. Savant syndrome
17. Say syndrome
18. Say–Meyer syndrome
19. Scalp–ear–nipple syndrome
20. SCARF syndrome
21. Scheie syndrome
22. Schimmelpenning syndrome
23. Schinzel–Giedion syndrome
24. Schmitt Gillenwater Kelly syndrome
25. Schnitzler syndrome
26. Schwartz–Jampel syndrome
27. Schöpf–Schulz–Passarge syndrome
28. Scimitar syndrome
29. Scott syndrome
30. Seaver Cassidy syndrome
31. Seckel syndrome
32. Second-impact syndrome
33. Secretan's syndrome
34. Seed dispersal syndrome
35. Senior–Løken syndrome
36. Sensenbrenner syndrome
37. Septo-optic dysplasia
38. Serkal syndrome
39. Serotonin syndrome
40. Serpentine fibula-polycystic kidney syndrome
41. Sertoli cell-only syndrome
42. Serum sickness–like reaction
43. Setleis syndrome
44. Severe acute respiratory syndrome
45. Sézary disease
46. Shaken baby syndrome
47. Shapiro syndrome
48. Sheehan's syndrome
49. Shell nail syndrome
50. Shone's syndrome
51. Short anagen syndrome
52. Short bowel syndrome
53. Short man syndrome
54. Short QT syndrome
55. Short rib – polydactyly syndrome
56. SHORT syndrome
57. Shwachman–Diamond syndrome
58. Shy-Drager syndrome
59. Sick building syndrome
60. Sick sinus syndrome
61. Silver–Russell syndrome
62. Simpson–Golabi–Behmel syndrome
63. Singleton Merten syndrome
64. Situs ambiguus
65. Sjögren's syndrome
66. Sjögren–Larsson syndrome
67. Skeeter syndrome
68. Skin fragility syndrome
69. Sliding uncus syndrome
70. Sly syndrome
71. Small intestinal bacterial overgrowth
72. Small Penis Syndrome
73. Smith Martin Dodd syndrome
74. Smith–Fineman–Myers syndrome
75. Smith–Lemli–Opitz syndrome
76. Smith–Magenis syndrome
77. Snapping hip syndrome
78. Snapping scapula syndrome
79. Sneddon's syndrome
80. Solipsism syndrome
81. somatostatinoma syndrome
82. Sopite syndrome
83. Sotos syndrome
84. Space adaptation syndrome
85. Spastic ataxia-corneal dystrophy syndrome
86. Spider lamb syndrome
87. Splenic flexure syndrome
88. Split hand syndrome
89. Spondylo-ocular syndrome
90. SPRED1
91. Staphylococcal scalded skin syndrome
92. STAR syndrome
93. Stauffer syndrome
94. Stendhal syndrome
95. Steroid dementia syndrome
96. Stevens–Johnson syndrome
97. Stewart–Treves syndrome
98. Stickler syndrome
99. Sticky platelet syndrome
100. Sticky skin syndrome
101. Stiff person syndrome
102. Stiff skin syndrome
103. Stimmler syndrome
104. Stockholm syndrome
105. Straight back syndrome
106. Stratton Parker syndrome
107. Streff syndrome
108. Strømme syndrome
109. Stuck song syndrome
110. Student syndrome
111. Sturge–Weber syndrome
112. Subclavian steal syndrome
113. Sudden infant death syndrome
114. Sudden wealth syndrome
115. Sugarman syndrome
116. Sulfonamide hypersensitivity syndrome
117. Summer penile syndrome
118. Sundowning
119. Superior mesenteric artery syndrome
120. Superior orbital fissure syndrome
121. Superior vena cava syndrome
122. Supernumerary nipples–uropathies–Becker's nevus syndrome
123. Supernumerary phantom limb
124. Survivor syndrome
125. Susac's syndrome
126. Sweet's syndrome
127. Swyer–James syndrome
128. Syndrome of inappropriate antidiuretic hormone secretion
129. Syndrome of subjective doubles
130. Syndrome Without A Name
131. Systemic inflammatory response syndrome

== T ==
1. TAFRO syndrome
2. Talk and die syndrome
3. TAN syndrome
4. TAR syndrome
5. Tardive dyskinesia
6. Tardive psychosis
7. Tarsal tunnel syndrome
8. Taura syndrome
9. Taussig–Bing syndrome
10. Tea and toast syndrome
11. TEMPI syndrome
12. Temple–Baraitser syndrome
13. Tension myositis syndrome
14. Terson syndrome
15. Testicular dysgenesis syndrome
16. Tetra-amelia syndrome
17. Tetralogy of Fallot
18. Teunissen–Cremers syndrome
19. Thevenard syndrome
20. Thoracic insufficiency syndrome
21. Thoracic outlet syndrome
22. Thrombotic thrombocytopenic purpura
23. Thymoma with immunodeficiency
24. Tietz syndrome
25. Tietze syndrome
26. Timothy syndrome
27. TNF receptor associated periodic syndrome
28. Tolosa–Hunt syndrome
29. Tonic tensor tympani syndrome
30. Tooth and nail syndrome
31. TORCH syndrome
32. Tourette syndrome
33. Townes–Brocks syndrome
34. Toxic anterior segment syndrome
35. Toxic oil syndrome
36. Toxic shock syndrome
37. Tracheobronchomegaly
38. Transurethral resection of the prostate syndrome
39. Transverse myelitis
40. Treacher Collins syndrome
41. Trench foot
42. Tricho-hepato-enteric syndrome
43. Trichothiodystrophy
44. Tricho–dento–osseous syndrome
45. Tricho–rhino–phalangeal syndrome
46. Trigeminal trophic syndrome
47. Triple X syndrome
48. Triploid syndrome
49. Trisomy 8
50. Tropical splenomegaly syndrome
51. Trotter's syndrome
52. Truman syndrome
53. Tsukuhara syndrome
54. Tumor lysis syndrome
55. Tumor necrosis factor receptor associated periodic syndrome
56. Turner syndrome
57. Twiddler's syndrome
58. Twin Anemia-Polycythemia Sequence
59. Twin-to-twin transfusion syndrome

== UV ==
1. Ulysses syndrome
2. Uncombable hair syndrome
3. Uner Tan syndrome
4. Upper airway resistance syndrome
5. Upper motor neuron syndrome
6. Upshaw–Schulman syndrome
7. Urban survival syndrome
8. Urban–Rogers–Meyer syndrome
9. Urethral syndrome
10. Urofacial syndrome
11. Urticarial vasculitis
12. Usher syndrome
13. UV-sensitive syndrome
14. VACTERL association
15. Valentino's syndrome
16. Van der Woude syndrome
17. van Gogh syndrome
18. Van Wyk and Grumbach syndrome
19. Vanishing bile duct syndrome
20. Vascular access steal syndrome
21. Vasoplegic syndrome
22. Ververi-Brady Syndrome
23. Vestibulocerebellar syndrome
24. Vici syndrome
25. Villaret’s syndrome
26. VIP syndrome
27. VIPoma
28. Visual looming syndrome
29. Vitreous touch syndrome
30. Vogt–Koyanagi–Harada disease
31. Von Hippel–Lindau disease
32. Vulvodynia

== W ==
1. Waardenburg syndrome
2. WAGR syndrome
3. Walker–Warburg syndrome
4. Wallis–Zieff–Goldblatt syndrome
5. Waltman Walter syndrome
6. Warkany syndrome 1
7. Warmblood Fragile Foal Syndrome
8. Wartenberg's Syndrome
9. Waterhouse–Friderichsen syndrome
10. Watson syndrome
11. Weaver syndrome
12. Weber's syndrome
13. Weill–Marchesani syndrome
14. Weismann-Netter–Stuhl syndrome
15. Weissenbacher–Zweymüller syndrome
16. Wellens' syndrome
17. Wende–Bauckus syndrome
18. Werner syndrome
19. Wernicke–Korsakoff syndrome
20. West syndrome
21. Westerhof syndrome
22. Wet lung syndrome in newborn
23. WHIM syndrome
24. White dog shaker syndrome
25. White dot syndromes
26. White spot syndrome
27. White-nose syndrome
28. Wiedemann-Steiner syndrome
29. Wiedemann–Rautenstrauch syndrome
30. Wildervanck syndrome
31. Williams syndrome
32. Williams–Campbell syndrome
33. Wilson's temperature syndrome
34. Wilson–Mikity syndrome
35. Wilson–Turner syndrome
36. Winchester syndrome
37. Winter-over syndrome
38. Wiskott–Aldrich syndrome
39. Wissler's syndrome
40. Withdrawal syndrome
41. Withering abalone syndrome
42. Wobbly hedgehog syndrome
43. Wolcott–Rallison syndrome
44. Wolff–Parkinson–White syndrome
45. Wolfram syndrome
46. Wolf–Hirschhorn syndrome
47. Woodhouse–Sakati syndrome
48. Work-related musculoskeletal disorders
49. Worster-Drought syndrome
50. Worth syndrome
51. Wrinkly skin syndrome

== XYZ ==
1. X-linked lymphoproliferative disease
2. Xeroderma pigmentosum
3. Xia-Gibbs Syndrome
4. XX male syndrome
5. XXXY syndrome
6. XXYY syndrome
7. XY gonadal dysgenesis
8. XYY syndrome
9. Yellow nail syndrome
10. Yemenite deaf-blind hypopigmentation syndrome
11. Yentl syndrome
12. Yim–Ebbin syndrome
13. Young's syndrome
14. Young–Madders syndrome
15. Young–Simpson syndrome
16. Yunis–Varon syndrome
17. Yunnan sudden death syndrome
18. Zadik–Barak–Levin syndrome
19. Zamzam–Sheriff–Phillips syndrome
20. Zechi-Ceide syndrome
21. Zellweger syndrome
22. Zieve's syndrome
23. Zimmermann–Laband syndrome
24. Zollinger–Ellison syndrome
25. Zori–Stalker–Williams syndrome

== See also ==
- List of congenital disorders
- List of genetic disorders
- List of mental disorders
