= ORS =

ORS or Ors may refer to:

== Airports ==
- Orcas Island Airport (FAA airport code ORS), San Juan County, Washington, United States
- Orpheus Island Resort Waterport (IATA airport code ORS), Queensland, Australia

== Medicine ==
- Oculo-respiratory syndrome, a usually transient condition following influenza immunization
- Olfactory reference syndrome, a mental disorder concerning body odor
- Oral rehydration solution, a type of fluid replacement used to prevent or treat dehydration
- Ovarian remnant syndrome, a condition caused by residual ovarian tissue after an oophorectomy

== Organizations ==
- Operational Research Society
- Orthopaedic Research Society, a professional, scientific and medical organization
- Otorhinolaryngological Research Society, British medical association

== Places ==
- Ors, a commune in Nord, France
- Ors, Vivaro-Alpine for Oulx, a comune of Turin, Piedmont, Italy

== People ==
- Paquita Ors (1928–2025), Spanish pharmacist and cosmetic businesswoman

== Satellites and rockets ==
- ORS-1 or USA-231, an American reconnaissance satellite launched in 2011
- ORS-4, the first launch of the rocket SPARK (rocket)
- ORS-5, a satellite launched in 2017

== Other uses ==
- Michigan Office of Retirement Services, United States
- ISO 639:ors or Orang Seletar language, native to Malaysia and Singapore
- Octopole reaction system, a type of Collision/reaction cell
- OID Resolution System, a system for mapping globally unique object identifiers into DNS name zone files; see ISO/IEC JTC 1/SC 6
- Old Red Sandstone, an assemblage of rocks in the North Atlantic region
- Operational Research Section, part of the British Royal Air Force in the Second World War
- Operationally Responsive Space Office, a joint initiative of several agencies within the United States Department of Defense
- Oregon Revised Statutes, the codified body of statutory law governing Oregon, United States
- Orlando Riva Sound (O.R.S.), former German Euro disco group
- Overseas Research Scholarship, an award for foreign country nationals to undertake research in the United Kingdom
- Oxygen reduction system, an active fire protection technique
- On-Rails Shooter, a type of shooter video game.
- Ors, short for Others; see List of legal abbreviations
