= Scalp–ear–nipple syndrome =

- Other names: Finlay–Marks syndrome
- Scalp–ear–nipple syndrome is inherited in an autosomal dominant manner.

Scalp–ear–nipple (SEN) syndrome (also known as Finlay–Marks syndrome) is a condition associated with aplasia cutis congenita.

== Presentation ==
The key affected features of this condition are described in its name.

Scalp: There are raised nodules over the posterior aspect of the scalp, covered by scarred non-hair-bearing skin.

Ears: The shape of the pinnae is abnormal, with the superior edge of the pinnae being turned over more than usual. The size of the tragus, antitragus and lobule may be small.

Nipples: The nipples are absent or rudimentary. The breasts may be small or virtually absent.

Other features of the condition include:

- Dental abnormalities, such as missing or widely spaced teeth
- Syndactyly, where toes or fingers may be partially joined proximally
- Renal abnormalities, such as renal hypoplasia or pyeloureteral duplication
- Eye abnormalities, such as cataracts, coloboma of the iris, and asymmetric pupils.

== Genetics ==
Candidate genes were identified for SEN syndrome by probing gene expression databases using simple descriptors of the main organs affected. SEN syndrome is caused by potassium-channel tetramerization-domain-containing 1 (KCTD1) mutations. Evaluation of ten families affected by SEN syndrome revealed KCTD1 missense mutations in each family tested. All of the mutations occurred in a KCTD1 region encoding a highly conserved bric-a-brac, tram track, and broad complex (BTB) domain that is required for transcriptional repressor activity. The identification of KCTD1 mutations in SEN syndrome reveals a role for this BTB-domain-containing transcriptional repressor during ectodermal development.

Smaldone et al. have described the molecular basis for the SEN syndrome. Hu et al. have identified a mechanism whereby disease related KCTD1 mutants and AP 2α mutants may work, by disrupting their interaction with the wildtype proteins AP 2α and KCTD1 and by influencing the regulation of the Wnt/β catenin pathway.

=== Inheritance ===
It is likely that this syndrome is inherited in an autosomal dominant fashion, however, there may be a recessive form with hypotonia and developmental delay.

== Treatment ==
A surgical operation has been described for breast reconstruction in a female with SEN syndrome. As the molecular basis of the SEN syndrome has been described, this may point the way to possible therapy in the future.

== Epidemiology ==
The original report was of a family in Cardiff, United Kingdom. There are subsequent reports of patients from the US, France, Australia, UAE, India and Cuba.

== Etymology ==
The syndrome was first described by Finlay and Marks as "An hereditary syndrome of lumpy scalp, odd ears and absent nipples". It was termed "The Finlay-Marks (S.E.N.) Syndrome" by Aase in 1987, "the Finlay Syndrome" by Le Merrer in 1991, the "Scalp-Ear-Nipple Syndrome" by Edwards in 1994, and "Finlay-Marks Syndrome" by Plessis in 1991. The OMIM number OMIM 181270 was assigned in 1987 by Victor A McKusick with the name "Scalp-Ear-Nipple Syndrome" and alternative names "Finlay-Marks Syndrome" and "SEN Syndrome".

== See also ==
- Say syndrome
- List of cutaneous conditions
