= Khyâl cap =

PTSD syndrome

Khyâl cap (Khmer: ខ្យល់ចាប់ seized by wind), attack by wind or attack of Khyâl is a syndrome of PTSD specific to Cambodian refugees. Symptoms are similar to the ones of common panic attacks and include palpitations, dizziness and shortness of breath. This Cambodian term directly translates to "wind attacks".

== Symptoms ==
The occurrence of khyâl attacks is usually spontaneous but they can be caused by various triggers, for example, negatively connoted odors, crowded spaces, and worrisome thoughts. Khyâl cap syndrome manifests both physical and psychological symptoms.

The physical symptoms include a sense of dizziness, headache, fatigue, muscle tension, chest tightness, difficulty sleeping and breathing. Individuals who are affected may experience a sense of heat or coldness and also a sense of pressure on the head.

People affected by khyâl cap also manifest psychological symptoms, for example problems concentrating, memory difficulties, irritability and mood swings. They can also experience anxiety, depression and PTSD due to a sense of loss of control and experience of trauma.

The symptoms may vary depending on the individual and cultural context in which they occur. Their occurrence seems to be tied to the cultural beliefs about the role of wind and spirit body and psychological health care intertwined.

Patients consider the khyâl attack to have distinguished levels of severity. It appears like certain symptoms, such as intense dizziness, sore jaw or sweating, indicate khyâl accumulation and overload. If the patient experiences mild symptoms, it can be considered to be a “near khyâl attack”.

== Causes ==
In many Asian, specifically Southeast Asian cultures, there are local conceptions of physiology featuring wind-like substances, commonly referred to as khyâl by Cambodians. Khyâl is thought to normally flow throughout the body alongside blood and exit the body in several ways. On occasion however, the typical khyâl flow is disturbed and can lead to a sudden surge of khyal that moves upwards within the body towards the head. This is often accompanied by blood and might lead to various symptoms and bodily complications. This is then referred to as “kaeut khyal” or “khyal cap”; both of which can be translated to “khyal attack”.

Khyal attacks can be induced by mental states or events, but can also occur randomly. In either way, it is thought to have its initial onset from either hindrance of khyal and blood flow in the limbs, or in the stomach and gastrointestinal tract. Alternatively, it can also be the result of an overproduction of khyal in the stomach as a result from poor digestion. These processes can occur individually or all at the same time to cause an upward surge of khyal and blood in the body.

The triggers of khyal attacks can be classified into several types based on their similarity to each other. They are recognized by Cambodians as common triggers of khyal attacks as well.

- Worry: Thoughts and worries about current life issues, such as e.g. finances, health or food shortages are a common trigger of khyal attacks. Cambodians might worry that the act of worrying itself can weaken the body and lead to khyal attacks, which can lead to a state of hypervigilance and anxiety. The associated symptoms might then be interpreted as the beginning of a khyal attack.
- PTSD symptoms: The physiological states which often accompany typical PTSD symptoms, such as nightmares or trauma recall, are interpreted as the beginning of a khyal attack.
- “Thinking a lot” (គិតច្រើន kut caraeun): This refers specifically to when an individual is often engaging in thoughts dealing with worry, trauma recall, thoughts of separation or actual separation from their family. Oftentimes, a combination of these thoughts occurs and causes a khyal attack.
- Physical Activity: Dizziness and other symptoms which can result from the action of standing up, rapidly turning the head or considerable physical effort can be interpreted as the beginning of a khyal attack.
- Environment: Frequent environmental triggers for khyal attacks included coming across unpleasant smells or being exposed to bad weather or sudden changes in weather. If a body is priorly weakened, it cannot cope with the abrupt changes in weather which results in a shock of the system that disrupts the usual flow of khyal. Additionally, a weakened body has dilated pores through which khyal can enter and trigger physiological disturbances. Symptoms such as dizziness, which are associated with traveling by car are referred to as car poisoning (ពុលឡាន pul laan), can also cause khyal attacks. Alternatively, there is a phenomenon called people poisoning (ពុលមនុស្ស pul meunuh) which refers to the various forms of stimulation in public spaces that can cause symptoms associated with khyal attacks.
- Fever: Not only can khyal attacks be caused by fever, but patients also believe that khyal attacks can cause fever. This can lead to a cycle in which the fear of a khyal attack can trigger a khyal attack.
- Random attacks: Whenever patients unexpectedly experienced physiological symptoms relating to khyal attacks without an event or mental state that triggered it, concerns arose about the beginning of a khyal attack. This in turn led to other psychosomatic symptoms which can constitute a khyal attack.
- Weakness: Weakness can either cause a khyal attack or act as a mediator between actual triggers (such as the ones mentioned above) and khyal attacks. It can cause khyal attacks for instance through the heart, which if weakened, does not pump blood and khyal through the body well. Khyal attacks can also be the result of overproduction of khyal in a weakened stomach that struggles with proper digestion.

== History ==
In 1953, after French Indochina collapsed due to the attack of the Viet Minh Communist army, Cambodia gained independence. During the Vietnam war, spanning between the years of 1955 and 1975, at first Cambodia remained a neutral kingdom under the autocratic rule of Prince Sihanouk, until he was overthrown by General Lon Nol in a coup aided by the American forces, converting the country into the Khmer republic. After seeking refuge in Beijing, Sihanouk became the supporter of a radical communist organization called Khmer Rouge, an armed wing of the Communist Party of Kampuchea.

Lon Nol allowed the U.S. (under the presidency of Lyndon B. Johnson and after him, Richard Nixon) to bomb Cambodia, in order to suppress guerrilla activity of Viet Cong troops fleeing over the Cambodian border, as well as to aid Nol's attempts to address the communist threat and later in attempts to prevent the Khmer Rouge from seizing the capital of Cambodia, Phnom Penh. Due to this political situation, the Khmer Rouge received a surge of support, as the party was using the damage caused by the bombings as one of the main points of their propaganda. The party, under the leadership of Pol Pot, eventually managed to seize the capital city in 1975, ending the Cambodian civil war and establishing Democratic Kampuchea. During Pol Pot's reign, Cambodia was completely under the rule of the Khmer Rouge. After seizing the capital, the country was cut off from the rest of the world in an attempt to reach communism. This was done mainly by forcibly relocating people from urban areas to villages in order to create a classless society. During this time, 1.7 to 2.2 million Cambodian people died due to executions, starvation, forced relocation, forced labor or abuse at the hands of the Khmer Rouge regime. This period later became known as the Cambodian Genocide, lasting until the year 1979 when the Vietnamese army overthrew the Khmer Rouge.

People in many Southeast Asian cultures believe that there is a wind-like substance flowing through the human body. To describe these internal winds, the word "khyâl" is employed, which is the same word used for external wind. This word seems to have its origin in Buddhist texts as well traditional Chinese medicine. The disruption of this wind flow in the body is seen as a cause of distress. This explains the status of "wind attacks" as a cultural phenomenon. The term "Khyâl Cap" was added to the DSM-5 as a part of its Glossary of Cultural Concepts of Distress, when it was first published in 2013. The Glossary of Cultural Concepts of Distress was developed to provide a list of culturally specific syndromes and idioms of distress, in order to make the approach to mental health more culturally sensitive, by recognizing the importance of cultural factors in shaping the experience and expression of distress. This in turn generated international interest as a potential way of improving the validity of both diagnosis and treatment.

== Treatment ==
The treatment of Khyâl attacks is dependent on the severity of the attack. The severity of Khyâl attacks are usually determined by the severity of the symptoms, the types of symptoms as well as the color of the skin after a process called coining by which a coin is dragged across the skin repeatedly. Khyâl attacks range from “near khyâl attack” (cong khyâl), which is characterized by mild symptoms to “khyâl overload” (khyâl koeu) which is characterized by severe symptoms and is considered a severe form of khyâl attack.

A mild khyâl attack is easily treated by the use of khyâl oil. This oil can either be sniffed, dapped under the nose, rubbed on temples or behind ears or used to massage the body of the patient. Khyâl oil is thought to help khyâl escape from the body by removing blockages when rubbed over the skin and open up air passages when sniffed.

For more severe forms of khyâl attacks patients rely on treatments such as coining or cupping. The procedure of cupping, also known as cup khyâl, is done by warming up a glass and applying the circular part of it into the skin. After a few minutes with the cooling down of the glass some vacuum is visible, which indicates the removal of the wind from the body. On the other hand, during the process of coining a khyâl ointment ( “preing kenlaa”) is applied to the skin. The ointment is usually applied in a streak of 5 to 6 inches and serves as a base for the process of coining. A coin is then being used to drag along the skin. This process is repeated multiple times. The actual process of coining can cause discomfort, however it is thought to relieve severe symptoms and dislodge any blockage. The ointment used in the process heats the body which in turn helps undo blockages and opens up pores to allow the khyâl to exit the cells body. These two methods have proven to successfully restore normal khyâl flow.

Coining can also be used as a diagnostic measure. Depending on the color of the skin after coining the patient can determine the severity of the khyâl attack. A bright red streak indicates only a slight increase of khyâl whereas a purple red streak points towards a higher concentration of khyâl in the body that has not been present for very long. If along the purple color bumps appear along the streaks then that indicates a more severe condition called “breaking spheres” (baek kroeup). This condition can also be referred to as “ripe khyâl” (khyâl baek) indicating that the khyâl has been in the body for a longer time period as well as “ruptured khyâl” (khyâl tdum) because the khyâl is being released upward during the process of coining.

== See also ==
- Neurosis
- List of syndromes
