= Sticky skin syndrome =

Skin condition

Sticky skin syndrome or acquired cutaneous adherence is a condition where the skin becomes sticky and objects may adhere to it. It is occasionally caused by the use of pharmaceutical drugs and chemotherapy drugs.

== Background ==
Sticky skin can be caused by the chemotherapy medications doxorubicin and ketoconazole.

== See also ==
- List of syndromes
