= Excess ovarian androgen release syndrome =

- Other names: Ovarian SAHA syndrome)
- Specialty: Dermatology/endocrinology

Excess ovarian androgen release syndrome is a cutaneous condition usually seen in young women between the ages of 16 and 20.

== See also ==
- Adrenal SAHA syndrome
- List of cutaneous conditions
