= Alezzandrini syndrome =

- Specialty: Dermatology
- Symptoms: Loss of vision, facial vitiligo, sound sensitivity
- Causes: Unknown
- Treatment: None
- Deaths: Unknown

Alezzandrini syndrome is a very rare syndrome characterized by a unilateral degenerative retinitis, followed after several months by ipsilateral vitiligo on the face and ipsilateral poliosis. Deafness may also be present.

== Signs and symptoms ==
Initially, there is a progressive loss of visual acuity, mostly in one eye. Infected areas experience pigmentation loss in the skin and hair. Unilateral tapetoretinal degeneration accompanied by the ipsilateral appearance of facial vitiligo and poliosis is the hallmark of Alezzandrini syndrome.

== Causes ==
It is unknown what causes Alezzandrini syndrome.

== Diagnosis ==
The clinical presentation is the basis for the diagnosis.

== Treatment ==
Psoralen plus ultraviolet A (PUVA) treatment is an option for cases with extensive depigmentation. Topical steroids may be used to treat vitiligo in specific areas. People who have vitiligo should wear sunscreen to avoid getting sunburned and developing skin cancer later on.

== See also ==
- List of cutaneous conditions
- Skin lesion
