= Lelis syndrome =

- Other names: Ectodermal dysplasia-acanthosis nigricans syndrome
- This condition is inherited in an autosomal recessive manner.
- Specialty: Medical genetics

Lelis syndrome is a genetic disorder, a rare condition with dermatological and dental findings characterized by the association of ectodermal dysplasia (hypotrichosis and hypohidrosis) with acanthosis nigricans. Other clinical features may include palmoplantar hyperkeratosis, nail dystrophy, intellectual deficit, disturbances of skin pigmentation (perioral and periorbital hyperpigmentation, vitiligo, and perinevic leukoderma) and hypodontia. Transmission is autosomal recessive.

== See also ==
- List of cutaneous conditions
