= Hapnes Boman Skeie syndrome =

- Other names: Extensor tendons of finger anomalies
- This condition is inherited in an autosomal dominant manner

Hapnes Boman Skeie syndrome is a rare genetic disorder in which subcutaneous angiolipomas form around the wrists, knees, and ankles. The syndrome was first described by Sveln Hapnes et al. in 1980.

Hapnes Boman Skeie syndrome is also known as "anomalous insertion of extensor tendons of fingers". This name derives from the condition that the tendons of the fingers are attached in such a way that the fingers cannot open or close normally. Though the tumors extend deeply into the muscle tissue, joints, and tendons, the tumors did not invade these structures.
