= Sticky platelet syndrome =

- Specialty: Hematology

Sticky platelet syndrome (SPS) is a heritable disorder of platelet function in which platelet hyperaggregation leads to hypercoagulability. It was first described by Mammen in 1983. It is inherited in an autosomal dominant pattern. It has not been associated with a specific gene, and it is not recognized as an entity in OMIM.

It can present in conjunction with protein S deficiency and factor V Leiden. It is not currently known if sticky platelet syndrome is a distinct condition, or if it represents part of the presentation of a more well characterized coagulation disorder.

SPS has not been widely studied and is not widely known.

== Signs and symptoms ==
Symptoms are related to hypercoagulability, usually presenting as venous thromboembolisms, arterial thrombosis, myocardial infarction, angina, and stroke.

== Cause ==
The syndrome is believed to be hereditary.

== Diagnosis ==
SPS is diagnosed by demonstrating platelet hyperaggregability. In a lab test called aggregometry, platelet stickiness is stimulated with epinephrine (EPI) and/or adenosine diphosphate (ADP). This test is not possible for patients being treated with acetylsalicylic acid until that substance has sufficiently cleared from their system.

== Treatment ==
Treatment usually consists of a daily low dose (80–100 mg) of aspirin. Anticoagulants (e.g. warfarin) or antiplatelets (clopidogrel) are often additionally prescribed following formation of a medically significant clot. Thrombelastography is more commonly being used to diagnose hypercoagulability and monitor anti-platelet therapy.
