= Njølstad syndrome =

Njølstad syndrome is a syndrome characterized by non-immune hydrops fetalis (NIHF), congenital pulmonary lymphangiectasia (CPL). Clinical features found in Njølstad syndrome include: facial and limbs lymphedema, facial abnormalities (thin upper lip, protruding ears), pectus excavatum and vulvar and labial edema.

It is named after the Norwegian pediatrician Pål Rasmus Njølstad who published a report on three siblings with the condition in 1997.
