= Childhood tumor syndrome =

- Specialty: Dermatology

Childhood tumor syndrome is a condition characterized by axillary (armpit) freckling, neurofibromas, and/or central nervous system (CNS) gliomas.

== See also ==
- Apert syndrome
- List of cutaneous conditions
