= Warmblood fragile foal syndrome =

Genetic disorder in horses

Warmblood fragile foal syndrome (WFFS) is a genetic disorder seen in horses. At first it was studied in Warmblood horses, but it is also present in Thoroughbreds, and potentially in any breed with Thoroughbred ancestry or outcrossing such as Quarter Horses, Standardbreds, and Morgans. It is autosomal recessive, so both sire and dam must be carriers for a foal to be affected. Foals with WFFS are naturally aborted, stillborn, or euthanized. WFFS is a genetic defect of connective tissue and foals born with it have hyper-extendible, abnormally thin, fragile skin that rips easily (similar to epidermolysis bullosa in humans).

It is associated with mutations in the gene coding for Lysyl hydroxylase 1 that result in a non functional enzyme.

A genetic test for WFFS was made commercially available in 2013. Approximately 9–11% of Warmblood horses are carriers, with lower carrier frequencies in Thoroughbreds and Knabstruppers.

Horses that are heterozygous for WFFS are phenotypically normal, so genetic testing is necessary to prevent breeding carriers.
