= Mukamel syndrome =

- Specialty: Dermatology

Mukamel syndrome is a cutaneous condition characterized by premature graying, lentigines, depigmented macules, microcephaly, and scoliosis.

== See also ==
- Mulberry molar
- List of cutaneous conditions
