= Odonto-tricho-ungual-digital-palmar syndrome =

- Other names: Odonto-tricho-ungual-digital-palmar syndrome, Mendoza-Valiente type
- This condition is inherited in an autosomal dominant manner.
- Specialty: Medical genetics

Odonto-tricho-ungual-digital-palmar syndrome is an autosomal dominant skin condition with salient clinical features of natal teeth, trichodystrophy, prominent interdigital folds, simian-like hands with transverse palmar creases, and ungual digital dystrophy.

== See also ==
- Skin lesion
