= Malnutrition–inflammation complex =

Common condition in chronic disease states such as chronic kidney disease

- Specialty: Nephrology
- Risk factors: Chronic medical conditions, including chronic kidney disease

Malnutrition–inflammation complex (syndrome) (MICS), also known as malnutrition–inflammation–cachexia syndrome, is a common condition in chronic disease states such as chronic kidney disease (where it is also known as uremic malnutrition or protein–energy malnutrition) and chronic heart failure.

MICS is a medical designation characterized by the presence of both malnutrition and inflammation in a person. Some have defined this as a low level of albumin in the blood (a biological marker of malnutrition) plus an elevated level of the inflammatory marker C-reactive protein (CRP), but other diagnostic parameters of malnutrition and inflammation also exist and there is no consensus regarding the diagnostic criteria. In patients on dialysis, MICS is associated with an increased risk of death, although the prognostic role of MICS in other chronic medical conditions is less-well understood. In a population based observational study, the presence of MICS was associated with a 1.57 times increased risk of death in dialysis patients. The combination of MIC and decreased functional status was associated with a 3.44 times increased risk of death including a 4 times increased risk of death from infection or cardiovascular disease. In a population based observational study of people undergoing dialysis in Japan, MIC was associated with an increased risk of cardiovascular events (defined as heart failure flare-ups requiring hospitalization, heart attack, or stroke (due to lack of blood flow to parts of the brain or bleeding in the brain)) as well as bone fractures.

The prevalence of MIC is not well known. In a population based study of people on dialysis, the prevalence of MIC varied between 16 and 27% depending on the country studied (Germany and Japan had the lowest rate of MIC at 16% each and Sweden and the United Kingdom had the highest rates at 27 and 26% respectively). The overall rate of MIC in that population study (across all countries studied) was 19%.

In patients on dialysis, there have been some interventions recommended that may improve nutritional levels and functional status, but their effects on mortality in those with MICS is not well known. Multiple medical organizations recommend regular exercise, both aerobic and anaerobic strength exercises, in those on dialysis. This may include exercise during the dialysis session. Nutritional supplementation with whey or soy based protein drinks has been shown to lower inflammatory markers (thus the prevalence of MICS) as well as improve functional parameters (such as walking speed) in patients on dialysis but the mortality benefit related to MICS is unclear.
