= Posterior ramus syndrome =

- Other names: Thoracolumbar junction syndrome, Maigne syndrome
- Dorsal ramus

Posterior ramus syndrome, also referred to as thoracolumbar junction syndrome, Maigne syndrome and dorsal ramus syndrome is caused by the unexplained activation of the primary division of a posterior ramus of a spinal nerve (dorsal ramus of spinal nerve). This nerve irritation causes referred pain in a well described tri-branched pattern. The diagnosis is made clinically with the variable presence of four criteria.

Descriptions of clinical involvement of posterior rami were found as early as 1893, but not until 1980 that LDRS was so precisely described. While any (or all) of the three branches may present themselves, their constancy of location is what allows this to be defined as a distinct syndrome. One branch sets off anteriorly to the groin or pubic region. A second branch remains posterior, innervating the lower back and upper gluteal region. Thirdly a lateral take-off passed down the anterolateral thigh or trochanter region. The term sclerotome, distinct from dermatome for anterior rami involvement, has been proposed to describe the pattern of pain produced from posterior rami.

== Diagnosis ==
The affected posterior ramus ends cutaneously causing trophic changes of the skin referred to as cellulalgia. Neuropathic pain is found in three well described regions and serves as the principal clinical component in diagnosing Lumbar Dorsal Ramus Syndrome (LDRS). Typical neuropathic skin changes are present: a thickening or nodularity of the skin, hair loss or even a swollen puffy appearance. Patients with pain in any of these three regions should have a complete physical exam of the entire spinal column including palpation of the facets and spinous processes in hopes of determining the level of origin. Secondly the patient will not usually have spontaneous pain at the offending spinal level. Pain can be provoked by palpation of the facet joints, or the level can remain veiled, with only the referred pain as evidence of the defect. Usually unilateral, bilateral cases have been described as we present here. Patients will not have pain radiating below the knee, which is more typical of anterior ramus involvement.

Third, radiographic evidence is non-contributory. MRI, CT and myelography are all ineffective at localizing the at-fault level. The typical degenerative changes seen on most images may lead to unnecessary surgery or false diagnosis. The posterior ramus is far removed from herniating or bulging discs.

The fourth criterion clinches the diagnosis: pain relieved by injection of local anesthetic into the correct facet joint. This diagnostic procedure can also be therapeutic; the injection of steroids or radiofrequency denervation of the medial branch can be added for refractory cases. Essential to remember is that the pattern of referred pain in no way hints at the spinal level involved. Multiple studies confirm that there is considerable overlap in the distribution of pain stemming from the zygapophyseal joints, including anterior, lateral or posterior thigh, groin, lumbar spine region, and trochanter region. This overlap of innervation is poorly handled by the standard dermatome map which physicians rely on to trace pain back to its source.
