= Raghib syndrome =

Rare Congenital Heart Syndrome

Raghib syndrome is a rare congenital heart defect in which the left superior vena cava (LSVC) drains into the left atrium in addition to an absent coronary sinus and an atrial septal defect. This can be considered a dangerous heart condition because it puts the individual at a high risk of stroke. Other defects often associated with Raghib syndrome include ventricular septal defects, enlargement of the tricuspid annulus, and pulmonary stenosis. While this is considered an extremely rare developmental complex, cases regarding a persistent left superior vena cava (PLSVC) are relatively common among congenital heart defects. It is also important to note that the PLSVC often drains into the right atrium, and only drains into the left atrium in approximately 10 to 20% of individuals with the defect.

In an individual with no underlying heart condition, the superior vena cava delivers blood returning from the body to the right atrium. Due to oxygen being used by various biological processes throughout the body, this blood has extremely low blood oxygenation levels. Therefore, the right side of the heart pumps this blood to the lungs where gas exchange takes place in the capillaries. The oxygenated blood is then transported back to the left side of the heart through pulmonary veins. The left atrium and left ventricle work to push the now oxygen-saturated blood up through the aorta and out to the body. As stated earlier, individuals with Raghib syndrome experience drainage from the left superior vena cava into the left atrium. This means that the deoxygenated blood returning from the body is directly bypassing the lungs and entering the left atrium where it will be pumped back into the body causing cyanosis. The result of this can have major implications on several biological processes, often requiring surgical intervention.

The coronary sinus is a vein continuing off of the great cardiac vein. It collects blood from the ventricular veins of the heart muscle during ventricle contraction and moves this blood into the right atrium. Essentially, this coronary sinus takes de-oxygenated blood from veins in the heart muscle (epicardial ventricular veins) and delivers it to the right side of the heart so it can be transported to the lungs and oxygenated again. It is extremely rare for an individual to be lacking this component of the heart.

Lastly, a common aspect of Raghib syndrome is an atrial septal defect. This is when there is a hole in the septum dividing the right and left atriums of the heart. The size of this hole may vary significantly from individual to individual Some may not even notice the symptoms of this defect until they are well into adulthood, if at all. The main concern with an atrial septal defect is that it can cause the right side of the heart to become overworked. This is because the amount of blood being pumped to the lungs increases significantly as blood from the left atrium leaks back into the right atrium. Thus leading to damaged blood vessels, increased blood pressure, and can even increase the right side of the heart.

== Causes ==
Raghib syndrome being classified as a congenital heart defect, means that this defect was present at birth. The anterior and posterior cardinal veins are a part of the embryonic venous system. During the eighth week of fetal development these cardinal veins will slowly shrink and disappear into other structures. The left anterior cardinal vein eventually transforms into the ligament of Marshall. If this vein fails to disappear, the persistent left superior vena cava will form. This anomaly is present in between 0.3% and 0.5% of the population and roughly 2.1% to 4.3% of those with congenital heart disease. Usually babies who experience the persistence of a left superior vena cava display other heart anomalies as well. In Raghib syndrome these additional defects include an absent coronary sinus along with an atrial septal defect. The persistent left super vena cava can interfere with rotation of the sinoatrial region, which thus causes the right and left cardinal veins of the heart to lie at the same level preventing the formation of a coronary sinus.

== Signs and symptoms ==
Symptoms of Raghib syndrome include:

- Heart palpitation
- Bluish discoloration of the skin (cyanosis)
- Left-handed clumsiness
- Hypertension
- Facial edema (facial swelling)
- Swelling of extremities
- Difficulty with fine motor tasks
- Slurred speech
- Left-sided facial numbness
- Fatigue
- Irregular heartbeats (arrhythmias)

The bluish discoloration of the skin, otherwise characterized as cyanosis, is a result of inadequate oxygenation of red blood cells. This presents mainly in the skin, nails, lips, or surrounding the eyes of individuals. This lack of oxygenation in the bloodstream can also be the cause of symptoms regarding issues with fine motor tasks or cognitive issues.

Other symptoms of Raghib syndrome are usually classified as a cryptogenic stroke, otherwise known as a stroke resulting from an unknown origin. These symptoms can include slurred speech, left-sided facial numbness, and left-handed clumsiness.

While some of the symptoms of Raghib syndrome can be intense, other individuals might be asymptomatic and unaware they have this congenital heart defect. Diagnosis can often be difficult since anomalies may not be noticed until a postmortem evaluation is done. Thus, in some instances it may be considered a benign anomaly.

=== Impact of cyanosis on a cellular level ===
Essentially, the main symptoms making this disease dangerous are a result of a lack of oxygen reaching vital tissues, muscles, and organs. Cyanosis is typically classified as having 85% or less oxygen saturation in your bloodstream. Typically your blood oxygen saturation levels should fall around 95% or higher. Oxygen is used in a number of biological processes throughout your body. Perhaps the most vital of these processes is cellular respiration. Cells take molecules of glucose and convert them to chemical energy in the form of adenosine triphosphate (ATP). During glycolysis, a single molecule of glucose is broken down into two molecules of pyruvate. Pyruvate is then converted into acetyl-coenzyme A (acetyl-CoA). The Citric acid cycle then takes acetyl-CoA and through a series of reactions generates molecules of NADH and FADH_{2} that are used in the electron transport chain.

The electron transport chain uses NADH and FADH_{2} to form a proton gradient in the mitochondria that will be used to generate ATP. Oxygen comes into play in complex IV of the electron transport chain. Oxygen is considered the final electron acceptor in this process. Essentially, complex IV accepts electrons from cytochrome c, one at a time, and then donates them to oxygen in order to form water. During this process, two hydrogen protons are transported into the intermembrane space of the mitochondria. Therefore, oxygen is a vital part of generating energy for cells.

== Diagnosis ==
In some cases, Raghib syndrome is not diagnosed until there is a postmortem evaluation of an individual. However, if symptoms are present or an individual has an evaluation of their heart conducted this can lead to early detection. Diagnosis typically involves the use of cardiac magnetic resonance imaging (CMRI). Magnetic resonance imagining is a medical imagine technique where the use of a magnetic field and computer-generated radio waves are able to construct 3D images of organs or tissues in your body.

Often times this is accompanied by a cardiac computed tomography (CCT) scan which creates 3D images of the heart and its blood vessels. Unlike the CMRI, this is done by directing X-rays at various angles in order to form a detailed and high-resolution scan of the heart. Thus, leading to the diagnosis of issues regarding the structure of the heart, valves, arteries, aorta, veins, and more. A CCT scan does involve the intravenous injection of contrast media that is used not only to define tissues, but to differentiate between them. The use of an MRI and a CCT scan can also aid doctors in determining a surgical intervention plan.

Another possible way to diagnose this heart condition is using an electrocardiogram (ECG or EKG). An individual will have electrodes placed on their chest that measure the electrical signal from the heart as it beats. There are several things tracked during an EKG. First is the "P wave" which takes place as the electrical impulse travels to the left and right atria causing them to contract and pump blood into the ventricles. These ventricles then make the "QRS" complex as they contract and push blood up and out of the heart muscle. The heart then fully relaxes and the "t wave" is the repolarization of the ventricles. EKGs of individuals with Raghib syndrome could show T wave inversions in leads V2-V4 and left ventricular hypertrophy. An echocardiogram, on the other hand, uses sound waves in order to create 3D images of the heart while it is in motion. This allows doctors to visualize how well blood is being pumped throughout the heart.

Cardiac catheterization is another way to understand the blood flow through the heart. During cardiac catheterization a long thin tube, otherwise known as a catheter, is inserted into a blood vessel to examine the heart valves, take blood or heart samples, and can even place dye into the bloodstream for better visualization. This catheter can be placed into a blood vessel in the groin, upper thigh, arm, or neck.

Lastly, patients may also display a significant reduction in arterial blood oxygen saturation. But depending on the size and impact of these heart defects, certain patients with Raghib syndrome could maintain oxygen saturation levels of over 90%.

== Treatment ==
Usually, treatment involves surgical intervention in order to repair the persistent left superior vena cava (PLSVC) from draining into the left atrium. Several surgical options can be used based on the individual. The main goal of these surgical interventions is to re-establish intracardiac flow of blood through the heart. Atrial patches can be applied to areas of concern such as the roof of the left atrium or where the coronary sinus should be. This helps to form a tunnel aiding blood flow. Often a surgical correction can be done to divert blood flow from the PLSVC into the right atrium, rather than the left atrium. Some sources indicate this is the main surgical solution. This can be done by attaching the PSLVC directly to the right atrium using a graft, attaching the PSLVC to the left pulmonary artery with an intra-atrial baffle, or performing a litigation of the PSLVC in general. However, surgically attaching the PLSVC to the left pulmonary artery can increase the risk of thrombosis. Some sources indicate that re-roofing the coronary sinus is important during this procedure to yield optimum results. Another source indicates that simple monitoring of an individual and placing them on medications can be used in less extreme cases. It is important to seek medical advice from a professional, as symptoms and degrees of this defect can vary immensely from individual to individual.

=== Case studies ===
In one case study a 40-year-old female was given a pericardial patch to close the atrial septal defect and then anastomosed the PSLVC directly to the left pulmonary artery. Thus, getting rid of the leakage of blood to the left atrium and ensured blood from the PSLVC was directed into the right side of the heart and pumped to the lungs. A follow-up several years later indicated the surgery was successful and she had no symptoms of a cryptogenic stroke.

Another case study was done with an 18-month-old infant diagnosed with Raghib syndrome after an MRI was done on his heart. An extracardiac intervention method was applied where the PLSVC was directly connected to the right atrial appendage. This was seen as the best intervention method since it decreased the risk of obstructing pulmonary vein blood flow, reduced tension on the left atrium, and hopefully prevented future arrhythmias.

A 31-year-old female showing left-handed clumsiness, hypertension, and stroke-like symptoms such as facial numbness and slurred speech was brought in for diagnosis. An in-depth analysis of her brain and heart showed signs of Raghib syndrome. Unlike other individuals here, she was discharged with several medications (aspirin and metoprolol), as well as a Holter monitor to keep track of her symptoms.

Lastly, a 25-year-old female had experienced several years of cyanosis and heart palpitations. The individual underwent surgical intervention after being diagnosed with Raghib syndrome using a chest X-ray and ECG. During surgery doctors found her coronary sinus was completely unroofed and the PLSVC was draining directly into the left atrium. Surgeons reroofed the coronary sinus, reconstructed the atrial septum to prevent drainage, and redirected the PLSVC to the right atrium.

== Prognosis ==
With surgical intervention, many individuals suffering from this defect can go on and lead fully functional lives. Issues may arise if the heart condition goes undiagnosed, thus putting an individual at an increased risk of stroke. However, it could remain a benign anomaly in other individuals and never result in symptoms or a diagnosis.

== Related Syndromes ==
- Persistent left superior vena cava (PLSVC)
- Atrial septal defect (ASD)
- Ventricular septal defect (VSD)
- Atrioventricular septal defect (AVSD)
- Patent ductus arteriosus (PDA)
- Acyanotic heart defect
