= Ardalan–Shoja–Kiuru syndrome =

- Specialty: Ophthalmology

Ardalan–Shoja–Kiuru syndrome is a clinical syndrome featuring hereditary gelsolin amyloidosis and retinitis pigmentosa. This syndrome was first recognized by two Iranian physicians, Mohammad Ardalan and Mohammadali Shoja and Finnish neurologist Sari Kiuru-Enari in an Iranian family. Hereditary gelsolin amyloidosis has originally been reported by Finnish ophthalmologist Jouko Meretoja and is known as Meretoja syndrome or Familial Amyloidosis, Finnish type. In addition to the classic manifestations of Finnish type Familial Amyloidosis, cutis laxa, progressive peripheral neuropathy and corneal lattice dystrophy, some of the affected members of the Iranian family have retinitis pigmentosa. This feature had not been previously reported with this type of amyloidosis. Ardalan–Shoja–Kiuru syndrome or hereditary gelsolin amyloidosis plus retinitis pigmentosa has not been found outside this single Iranian family.
