= May–White syndrome =

- Specialty: Neurology

May–White syndrome is a rare familial progressive myoclonus epilepsy with lipomas, deafness, and ataxia. This syndrome is probably a familial form of mitochondrial encephalomyopathy.
