= Adult-onset immunodeficiency syndrome =

- Other names: Adult-onset immunodeficiency with anti-interferon-gamma autoantibodies, Acquired adult-onset immunodeficiency, Anti-IFN-gamma autoantibody syndrome, Adult-onset immunodeficiency due to anti-interferon-gamma autoantibody.
- Symptoms: Opportunistic infections, high anti-interferon-gamma autoantibodies.
- Complications: Infections.
- Usual onset: 30-50 years old.

Adult-onset immunodeficiency syndrome is a type of immunodeficiency. It is linked to vulnerability to disseminated infections brought on by opportunistic pathogens. People with this condition have increased levels of anti-interferon-gamma autoantibodies. These particular immune system proteins mistakenly target an individual's own tissues. It is most commonly reported among previously healthy Southeast Asians. The average age of onset is between 30 and 50 years. Non-tuberculous mycobacteria, non-typhoidal salmonella, cytomegalovirus, Penicillium marneffei, and varicella zoster virus are some of the pathogens that can cause infections in patients with this illness. Symptoms vary depending on the infection(s) present in each individual.

It is unknown what causes the development of anti-interferon-gamma autoantibodies, however, genetic factors are thought to be implicated. A number of studies indicate a link with specific HLA genes. These genes aid the immune system in distinguishing between proteins produced by the body and those produced by outside threats. Some have proposed that an infection may first initiate the formation of autoantibodies, and that subsequent infections increase their activity.

There is currently no standard medication for Adult-onset immunodeficiency syndrome, and treatment is dependent on the infection(s) present. Long-term antibiotic therapy and rituximab therapy have been used to manage Adult-onset immunodeficiency syndrome. Multiple treatments may be required at the same time.

== Signs and symptoms ==
At least one physician associates the symptoms with tuberculosis. Some lethal overwhelming infections are reported, aggravating people who already suffer other conditions such as HIV/AIDS. Clinical manifestations can involve symptoms similar to Generalized pustular psoriasis.

== Cause ==
Little is publicly known about the underlying factors causing the disease. Genetic factors are suspected, but the disease does not appear to be heritable. One specific gene hypothesized to be involved in the disorder is SERPINA1. Also, something in the environment may trigger the disease.

== Mechanism ==
An elevated concentration of autoantibodies that block interferon-gamma was detected in most patients.

== Society and culture ==
The swash.com website uses AIDS 2.0 as the moniker for maybe another, apparently highly contagious AIDS-like condition described by The Epoch Times.

The Daily Beast has described this disease emphatically as not AIDS 2.0.
