= Hemihyperplasia–multiple lipomatosis syndrome =

- Specialty: Dermatology

Hemihyperplasia–multiple lipomatosis syndrome is a cutaneous condition characterized by multiple lipomas in association with asymmetric (but non-progressive and non-distorting) overgrowth, cutaneous capillary malformations, and thickened plantar skin with prominent creases.

== See also ==
- Involutional lipoatrophy
- List of cutaneous conditions
