= Trotter's syndrome =

Cluster of cancer-related symptoms

Trotter's syndrome is a cluster of symptoms associated with certain types of advanced nasopharyngeal carcinoma. The cause of pain is the mandibular nerve of the foramen ovale, through which the tumor enters the calvarium. Symptoms include the following:

1. Unilateral conductive deafness due to middle ear effusion
2. Trigeminal neuralgia due to perineural spread
3. Soft palate immobility
4. Difficulty opening mouth
