= Wende–Bauckus syndrome =

- Other names: Pegum syndrome
- Specialty: Dermatology

Wende–Bauckus syndrome is a cutaneous condition characterized by tiny white macules on the trunk with confluence within flexures.

== See also ==
- Waardenburg syndrome
- List of cutaneous conditions
