= Myomatous erythrocytosis syndrome =

- Other names: MES
- Specialty: Hematology

Myomatous erythrocytosis syndrome (MES) is an uncommon gynecological disorder associated with isolated polycythemia and uterine fibroids. The primary feature of myomatous erythrocytosis syndrome is that hemoglobin goes back to its baseline level following the removal of the myoma. There have only been 50 cases of myomatous erythrocytosis syndrome documented as of 2023. Thomsen and Marson published the first case in 1953.

== Signs and symptoms ==
The most typical presentations were dyspnea (12.3%), menstrual irregularities (24.6%), skin discoloration (33.3%), and abdominal or pelvic distension or mass (93%).

== Causes ==
Previous explanations for the etiology of myomatous erythrocytosis syndrome included the possibility of renal outflow obstruction, myomatous arteriovenous shunts, or interference with pulmonary ventilation as possible pathways resulting in the hematological abnormalities that are characteristic of this illness. But these theories have been refuted. The current theory regarding myomatous erythrocytosis syndrome links aberrant EPO production from the myomatous tissue to the observed hematological changes.

== Diagnosis ==
Hematological values such as hemoglobin, hematocrit, and red blood cell counts are elevated in patients with myomatous erythrocytosis syndrome.

The diagnostic criteria for myomatous erythrocytosis syndrome includes polycythemia, uterine myoma, and return of hemoglobin levels to normal following fibroid excision surgery.

== Treatment ==
Hysterectomy is the most common treatment for myomatous erythrocytosis syndrome. Horwitz and McKelway successfully performed the first myomectomy for myomatous erythrocytosis syndrome. Perioperative bleeding and urogenital injuries were found to be the most frequent surgical complications in myomatous erythrocytosis syndrome cases, which are comparable to those encountered during the resection of a large myomatous uterus.

== See also ==
- Uterine fibroid
- Polycythemia vera
