= Say syndrome =

- Other names: Say-Barber-Hobbs syndrome
- This condition is inherited in an autosomal dominant manner.
- Specialty: Dermatology

Say syndrome is a condition characterized by bilateral acromial dimples.

In an article published in Humangenetik, Say et al. (1975) described a 'new,' presumably autosomal dominant disorder characterized by cleft palate, short stature, microcephaly, large ears, and hand anomalies.

== See also ==
- Rud syndrome
- List of cutaneous conditions
