= Summer penile syndrome =

Medical condition

Summer penile syndrome (also known as 'Lions Mane Penis') is a seasonal pediatric medical condition characterized by redness, swelling (edema), and itching (pruritus) of the penile skin.

== Cause ==
Summer penile syndrome is usually caused by chigger bites on the penis, or, more rarely, by exposure of the genital region to plants like poison ivy, sumac, and oak. The majority of cases occur in the summer months, with the clothing associated with warmer weather making penis-arachnid and penis-plant contact more likely.

== Treatment ==
First line treatments for summer penile syndrome include oral antihistamines and cold compresses. In extreme cases where the sufferer is in severe pain or is unable to pass urine, systemic corticosteroids are considered.
