= McKittrick–Wheelock syndrome =

McKittrick-Wheelock syndrome
- Specialty: Gastroenterology

McKittrick-Wheelock syndrome is an uncommon syndrome caused by large, villous adenomas that secrete high quantities of electrolyte-rich mucin. This may lead to pre-renal acute kidney injury, secretory diarrhea, and dehydration. It is estimated that 2-3% of large villous adenomas, typically greater than 4 cm in diameter, will present with this hypersecretory pattern.

== Symptoms and signs ==
Patients typically present with a history of chronic, watery diarrhea. Before the cause is established, they may have multiple hospitalizations for dehydration and kidney failure. Patients may present with hyponatremia, hypokalemia, and elevated creatinine.

== Treatment ==
The treatment is supportive until the villous adenoma can be resected surgically.

== History ==
The syndrome was first described by Leland S. McKittrick and Frank C. Wheelock. In 1954 they reported a case of an 84-year-old woman with a large villous papilloma of the rectum, who presented with weakness, syncope and oliguria.

== See also ==
- Colorectal cancer
- Sessile serrated adenoma
- Tubulovillous adenoma
