= Hyperosmolar syndrome =

Very high blood glucose concentration

Hyperosmolar syndrome or diabetic hyperosmolar syndrome is a medical emergency caused by a very high blood glucose level.

The prefix "hyper-" means high, and "osmolarity" is a measure of the concentration of active particles in a solution, so the name of the syndrome simply refers to the high concentration of glucose in the blood.

== Signs & symptoms ==
Hyperosmolar syndrome may take a long duration (days to weeks) to develop. However, certain signs and symptoms may indicate that such a condition is developing. Some of the signs include the following:

1. Excessive thirst despite frequently taking water or other liquids
2. Continued high level of blood sugar
3. Dry mouth
4. Increased urination
5. Rapid pulse
6. Shortness of breath with exertion
7. Skin becomes warm and dry with no sweating
8. Sleepiness and/or a condition of confusion

== Diagnosis ==
Early diagnosis for (diabetic) hyperosmolar syndrome is crucial. Doctors or trained medical practitioners will perform both mental and physical exams, and may ask those present about the patient's medical history. Physical tests will likely include the collection of blood and urine samples to measure blood sugar levels as well as the functioning of the kidneys. These tests will also indicate whether there is an infection. The blood tests allow for the detection of different solutes in the plasma, as well as the glucose levels. Moreover, further laboratory tests will measure ketone levels as an indication of ketosis. A high ketone count found in the urine samples means that the body is sourcing its energy through the burning of fat at a fast rate, turning fatty acids into ketones. High blood sugar levels may cause a decrease in sodium levels, which is another potential indicator of hyperosmolar syndrome.

== Treatment ==
Emergency treatment can come into effect within hours in case of diabetic hyperosmolar syndrome. Treatment involves intravenous fluids to replenish hydration-reducing plasma, intravenous insulin to lower blood sugar levels, and intravenous potassium and sodium to replace the lost electrolytes which are essential for cell function, as insulin will force some electrolytes into the cell. Any underlying conditions (e.g. kidney disease) will also be treated in order to prevent further occurrences. Following the administration of intravenous insulin, dextrose should be added once glucose levels reach the 250–300 mg/dL target level. It is important to prevent a rapid reduction in osmolality so as to avoid cerebral edema. Dependent on serum potassium levels, a potassium replacement should be administered if sodium levels are maintained.
