= Sudden wealth syndrome =

- Specialty: Abnormal psychology
- Symptoms: Social isolation, paranoia, uncertainty, shock
- Duration: Dependent on situation
- Causes: Sudden lottery winnings, large inheritances, gambling winnings, entrepreneurship [e.g. founders becoming wealthy quickly or suddenly], trading cryptocurrencies (bitcoin)
- Risk factors: Depression, anxiety disorders, insomnia
- Diagnostic method: Dependent on a professional psychologist or psychiatrist's diagnosis
- Prevention: Hiring a financial advisor and undergoing therapy
- Treatment: Seeking help from a psychiatrist
- Medication: None

Sudden wealth syndrome (SWS) is a term given to a psychological condition where the overwhelming pressures of unexpected and/or abrupt fortune can develop into emotional and behavioural afflictions. It can also be referred to as an identity crisis. The term sudden wealth syndrome was coined by practising wealth psychologist, Stephen Goldbart, co-founder of the Money, Meaning and Choices Institute (MMC Institute), as he noticed a great increase in symptoms related to gaining a large influx of wealth unexpectedly or abruptly.

As a sub-category of abnormal psychology, sudden wealth syndrome is often diagnosed by analysing common symptoms, changes in relationships, and causes. Recognisable signs of developing, or having developed sudden wealth syndrome, include emotional afflictions such as isolation from former relationships, the paranoia of losing one's affluence, guilt, and the uncertainty or shock due to the unexpected nature of their fortune. These often develop from situations, such as winning the lottery or other gambling activities, unprepared inheritance, cryptocurrencies, and investing in businesses.

This sudden influx of challenging emotions can cause an individual to adopt self-destructive behaviours, which include distancing oneself from relationships. Concomitantly, a person with sudden wealth syndrome may notice a change in how their friends, family, and colleagues interact with them upon news of their new financial status. Further self-destructive behaviours include excessive and hasty spending, and inappropriate decision making.

Treatment for sudden wealth syndrome is given through therapeutic meetings, clinic visits and seeking advice from psychiatrists, psychologists, and financial advisors for additional support in overcoming the stress associated with sudden wealth. If careful measures are not taken to prevent the development of sudden wealth syndrome, symptoms can lead to further health diagnoses, such as depression, anxiety, and insomnia.

== Classification ==
Sudden wealth syndrome is a term given to the psychological condition or identity crisis characterised by symptoms of isolation, paranoia, guilt, uncertainty, and shock. It is a form of abnormal psychology that can lead to more common mental health diagnoses, such as depression, anxiety, and insomnia. Individuals with sudden wealth syndrome often lose their fortune quickly after receiving it.

The severity of sudden wealth syndrome is dependent on the individual and their financial circumstances. This means the amount of wealth that can trigger symptoms and subsequent self-destructive behaviour is specific to the individual's life cycle stage, experiences, relationship with money, and other influential factors. Sudden wealth syndrome is more likely to affect younger inheritors or younger sudden wealth recipients due to the responsibilities and changes attached to acquiring a large sum of money. The condition can still impact and develop within adults and the elderly, however; due to their establishment within society and their more mature life cycle stage, many individuals within this older age bracket are most probable to accept retirement and further financial responsibility.

== Etymology ==
The history of sudden wealth syndrome is prominently linked to the Money, Meaning and Choice Institute (MMC Institute) located in California, United States. Stephen Goldbart, the co-founder of MMC Institute and wealth psychologist, coined the term in the 1990s, which has become the most commonly referred to term for the adjustment issues associated with receiving sudden wealth, although, it has not been denoted an official psychological diagnosis.

Most reported cases of developing sudden wealth syndrome are associated with modern societies due to the classification of the term first appearing in the 1990s as the MMC Institute characterised the psychological condition on their website. A famous case of sudden wealth syndrome follows Powerball winners Willie Seeley and wife, Donna who appeared on The Today Show after suddenly acquiring $3.8 million in 2013. Both Seeley and Donna experienced symptoms of depression and paranoia, as well as noticing changed relationships.

However, sources have also linked the history of sudden wealth syndrome to ancient Greek mythology. Some research suggests the ancient Greek myth of King Midas of Phrygia describes the first case of sudden wealth syndrome. Elements of Midas' myth exhibit common characteristics with sudden wealth syndrome, such as the possible negativity of acquiring a large sum of money, distancing and isolation, the unpredictability and potential disappointment of expectations, and how it can expose underlying issues from one's childhood.

== Causes ==
The common situations which lead to sudden wealth syndrome all encompass an unexpected or abrupt nature of circumstances. The most prominent and common cases tend to arise from winning the lottery, trading in cryptocurrencies (e.g. bitcoin), and inheriting a large sum of money from relatives. Further examples include other gambling forms, such as sports betting, investments, and short-term income. The term has also been applied to the new millionaires who made money as Silicon Valley entrepreneurs.

For inheritors of sudden wealth, younger individuals are more susceptible to developing sudden wealth syndrome. Receiving an inheritance without time for preparation presents larger overwhelming responsibility, changes in lifestyle and potential change in relationships. Younger inheritors are more likely to experience confusion of their identity as they are faced with the prospect of retirement at an early age. This leads to a younger individual's sense of purpose being challenged, which often results in a feeling of uncertainty regarding their direction for future careers, financial situations, and relationships.

Additionally, factors linked to a person's upbringing or background regarding money can also contribute to being more susceptible to developing sudden wealth syndrome. Studies reveal that a person who has grown up with an unstable understanding or view of wealth is more likely to experience the symptoms associated with sudden wealth syndrome, such as shock, uncertainty, paranoia, and isolation. Bankruptcies, poor boundaries surrounding money, and compulsive spending among family members are examples of common childhood experiences that lead to a person's likelihood of developing sudden wealth syndrome.

== Symptoms ==
There are a multitude of symptoms related to sudden wealth syndrome, which can assist in recognising the risk of, or development of the psychological condition. Symptoms commonly occur as a result of the unexpected and abrupt nature of receiving a large sum of money suddenly as it holds the potential to change their lifestyle and relationships. This can create mental and emotional stress when attempting to adjust to a new lifestyle and financial situation. Symptoms typically endure over a considerable period.

The most common symptoms of sudden wealth syndrome include:

=== Isolation and paranoia ===
The pressures of obtaining a large sum of money unexpectedly can trigger many self-critical emotions. Isolation primarily occurs due to depressive moods, which influence one to distance themselves from former friends, family, and colleagues. This can be a result of a heightened sense of lifestyle differences, where an individual's social group may not be able to afford the wealth recipient's expensive lifestyle choices, such as luxury products and travelling. This may result in a person separating themselves socially and morally from former relationships, and isolating themselves from familiar environments.

Paranoia can act as a symptom on its own or can be an influencing factor in isolating oneself. Typically, paranoia in sudden wealth syndrome entails an extreme fear that the recipient of affluence will lose their good fortune, or it will suddenly vanish. Additionally, paranoia can trigger a state known as ticker shock, which is used to describe someone who obsessively watches the stock market volatility to ensure their new fortune or new investments are not losing value.

Isolation and paranoia can also be caused by their friend, family, and/or work relations own decisions to isolate themselves from the recipient as a result of jealousy, envy or resentment. These changed relationship dynamics and behaviour from an individual's social group can influence the onset of paranoia and a desire to isolate from their familiar social environments. These developments of paranoia and isolation can lead to more specific mental health issues, such as anxiety disorders, diagnosed depression, and/or insomnia.

=== Guilt ===
Guilt is a common characteristic of sudden wealth syndrome. Often, this results in a questioning of worthiness and guilt of procuring a large sum of money. Wealth psychologist, Stephen Goldbart, compares the guilt of sudden wealth to survivor guilt.

Guilt can also lead to self-destructive and self-defeating behaviours. Unconscious guilt can lead to behaviours that are ways of punishment, stemming from an individual's belief that they do not deserve their good fortune and are not entitled to it. According to the MMC Institute, "humans love consistency and predictability" (MMC Institute, n.d.). If a person feels guilt or anxiety about their sudden wealth, they are more likely to undermine achievements or situations that lead to their good fortune.

In turn, guilt can increase feelings of depression and can cause an individual to begin to feel empty and pessimistic, and may find that normal activities once enjoyable are now uninteresting. This may lead to feeling disconnected from one's usual peers and environment, developing an identity confusion as they question why they deserve their good fortune, and eventually result in becoming out of touch with oneself.

=== Shock and uncertainty ===
Initial reactions to acquiring sudden wealth vary depending on the individual's background and financial circumstances. A combination of shock and uncertainty can cause a person to resort to self-destructive coping mechanisms, such as making risky investments and/or promises to friends or family, and excessive spending. Both shock and uncertainty endure past a momentary emotion, and can become continuing adversities throughout the duration of sudden wealth syndrome.

Shock is a common response to the unexpected news of receiving a large influx of money and can cause one to feel paralysed. This can lead to many challenges, including the inability to decide how to spend one's money. In this case, even small decisions can become stressful and overwhelming challenges for a recipient of sudden wealth. Usually, this reaction is influenced by being emotionally unprepared for the myriad of changes facing an individual post-influx of wealth. These changes can include, but are not limited to, an increase in responsibility, a new lifestyle, and changed nature of relationships. Consequently, shock can entail a feeling of numbness and may leave a recipient of affluence wondering what the next step in their future will be.

Uncertainty accompanies shock as it can also make an individual feel paralysed and unable to make decisions. Uncertainty encompasses the confusion and lack of clarity for the future due to the overwhelming nature of suddenly becoming wealthy. In turn, a person may not want to tell people of their good fortune as they have difficulty believing they have acquired it in the first place. Uncertainty can also entail identity confusion as they lose clarity of who they are and what their core values in life are. Additional attention from charities and other organisations can cause the individual to feel paralysed and suspicious of a person's intentions. As a result, an individual may further develop feelings of depression and isolation.

== Effects on relationships and finances ==
Sudden wealth syndrome can also affect an individual's finances and relationships, often as a result of the emotional and behavioural afflictions associated with obtaining a large sum of money unexpectedly. Conflicting emotions, such as paranoia, guilt, shock, and uncertainty, can cause a strain on both old and new relationships with family, friends, and colleagues. These changes in relationships can influence an individual with sudden wealth syndrome to isolate themselves from their former affiliations. In this case, distance from relationships also occurs as new wealth can create a substantial difference in lifestyle to former friends, family, and colleagues, where the new-found luxuries and travelling expenses are unreachable for others offered to participate in social gatherings.

A more common cause is that established relationships may exhibit a change in how friends, family or colleagues interact with the recipient. This change in relationship dynamics could be due to a difference in lifestyle, but is often associated with resentment or jealousy. Consequently, an individual must also decipher opportunistic and advantageous from genuine relationships. According to research, a common experience of sudden wealth syndrome is acquaintances or established friends and family looking for the benefits of a person's wealth to be shared. Salesmen, agents, financial advisors, and charities may deluge a person once news of their sudden wealth is released. Many will find people offering advice, recommendations, and new business opportunities, and will experience individuals requesting loans or gifts.

Symptoms of sudden wealth syndrome and the changes in lifestyles and relationships can often cause an individual to adopt self-destructive and self-defeating behaviours in response to their new financial status. A struggle of adjustment can lead to overspending, pursuing risky investments, loaning money to people hastily, and giving their fortune away. A famous study in 2010 from the Review of Economics and Statistics revealed that, out of 35,000 lottery winners who obtained between $50,000 and $150,000 in winnings, 1,900 of them had filed for bankruptcy within 5 years. A 2015 paper in The American Economic Review also presented that 15% of NFL players filed for bankruptcy after 12 years of retirement. In cases of inheritance, approximately "70% of wealth transfers fail by the third generation" (Livingston, Amy, Money Crashers). Many individuals with sudden wealth syndrome may lose their new fortune due to a lack of planning and preparedness for the changes that will accompany their wealth.

== Prevention ==
The prevention of sudden wealth syndrome depends upon the diagnosis and recognition of early symptoms and changes in relationships. As the influx of wealth is unexpected, there is a limited amount of ways to be prepared for sudden wealth syndrome and in turn, to avoid developing the psychological condition.

For individuals who have received an inheritance, the news of receiving a large sum of money without prior knowledge can be overwhelming. If a parent, grandparent, or carer is considering, or has decided to bequeath their wealth to another person, psychologists say it is important to tell them earlier rather than later. The added time and prior knowledge can allow a person to comprehend the situation and plan their future accordingly with ample time to adjust to their eventual circumstances.

Otherwise, in cases of lottery winners, sudden inheritances, and trading of cryptocurrencies, educating oneself is highly recommended by professionals and wealth psychologists. By researching how to budget and save, understanding the investment basics, and overall gaining financial literacy, a recipient may feel more comfortable and knowledgeable of their situation. An additional step to prevention is hiring a financial advisor and/or seeking a psychiatrist or psychologist for emotional support. A financial advisor's priority is to prevent the client from making missteps in their actions post-influx of wealth. A financial advisor can assist with assessing the situation and providing unbiased advice for both current and future choices, such as business investments or large purchases. They can also help to set realistic goals and objectives for a person's finances, which can be broken down into categories of lifestyle, family, future, and charitable donations. This analysis of short and long-term goals can provide stability to the recipient's overwhelming circumstances. Overall, a financial advisor can help to bring a "clarity and simplicity" (Stenner, Thane, Vol. 6, Iss. 12, 2003) to their client's lives in a stressful time.

Emotional planning is also a method of prevention. Expert Susan Bradley calls this mechanism a decision-free zone, where the recipient is encouraged to wait a period of time before making any decisions regarding their wealth. The outcomes of this zone include staying in control, making gradual and logical decisions, understanding taxes, and working through emotions, which can give a recipient breathing space. Other methods include involving oneself in community activities, maintaining discipline, and keeping their sudden wealth discreet. Patience is also motioned as a vital quality to exercise when receiving a large influx of money unexpectedly.

== Diagnosis and treatment ==
There is no medicinal treatment for sudden wealth syndrome. Treatments or methods of overcoming the condition usually include clinic visits and consulting in therapists, psychologists or psychiatrists. This can help an individual achieve stability to their situation and provide them with both emotional and financial security.

To diagnose and treat sudden wealth syndrome, a clinician must address a person's current emotions and behaviours, as well as their socioeconomic status and childhood relationship with money. This includes analysing the recipient's cultural views of affluence, their intra-personal relationship with themselves, and relationships with family, friends, and colleagues. Additionally, understanding a recipient's family origin can reveal a background or relation to compulsive spending, bankruptcy, poor boundaries surrounding money, and using money as a means of reward or control.

== See also ==
- Nouveau riche
