= Centurion syndrome =

- Specialty: Dermatology

Centurion syndrome is characterized by anterior malposition of the medial part of the lid, with displacement of puncta out of the lacus lacrimalis due to a prominent nasal bridge.
