= Yentl syndrome =

Difference in heart attack course of action between genders

The Yentl syndrome refers to the under-diagnosis of ischemic heart disease (IHD) in women compared to men, as well as the general gender disparity in cardiovascular health research. The name is taken from the 1983 film Yentl starring Barbra Streisand in which her character plays the role of a male in order to receive the education she desires. The phrase was coined in a 1991 academic paper by Dr. Bernadine Healy titled "The Yentl syndrome", where she condemned the characterization of coronary heart disease as only prevalent in males and called for awareness of gender differences in health.

Cardiovascular disease (CVD) is the leading cause of death in women worldwide, yet it continues to be under-recognized and under-treated due to a complex interplay of biological, social, and cultural factors. Historically, women's health concerns were often dismissed, and although significant improvements have been made, implicit gender biases persist leading to delays in diagnosis and treatment. Low awareness further contributes to disparities, as many women underestimate their cardiovascular risk and providers may not consistently view CVD as a primary concern. Beyond these systemic issues, biological differences between sexes play an important role. There are also female-specific risk factors for cardiovascular disease to consider such as pregnancy complications, early menopause, autoimmune disease, and conditions like PCOS. The combination of under-recognition, bias, and sex-specific biology contributes to delayed care and worse outcomes, a disparity often described as Yentl Syndrome by researchers such as C. Noel Bairey Merz.

== History of gender disparities in cardiovascular health ==
The publishing of "The Yentl Syndrome" was an open call to address the issue of gender disparities in heart health, but specifically focused on male-dominant research of coronary artery disease that did not take estrogen into consideration, which significantly affected women's health outcomes in the treatment and diagnosis of IHD. However, Yentl Syndrome was expanded to describe the general gender disparity in cardiovascular health. Disparity in IHD and heart disease is not strictly constructed of biological differences; socioeconomic differences, culture, and age exacerbate the disparity, especially given that 80% of IHD is preventable.

Much of medical research has focused primarily on symptoms of male heart attacks, and many women have died due to misdiagnosis because their symptoms present differently; specifically in relation to under-diagnosis of angina in young female patients. In addition to under-diagnosis, gender differences in the treatment of heart disease in women lead to worse health outcomes in comparison to men. Women under the age of 50 are twice as likely to die from a heart attack caused by IHD than men of the same age. Heart disease is the leading cause of death for women in the United States, killing 299,578 women in 2017—or about 1 in every 5 female deaths. However, heart disease continues to be thought of as a "man's disease".

== Social and cultural factors ==
Gender bias in healthcare: A long history of women's health concerns being dismissed as "psychogenic" or attributed to "hysteria" has shaped the way symptoms are perceived. Although these ideas have long been disproven, implicit biases may persist and can still lead to harm. For example, if a physician's first instinct when a woman presents with chest pain is to suspect anxiety or exaggeration, vital minutes may be lost. Similarly, this historical tendency to minimize or dismiss women's symptoms can deter female patients from seeking care and ultimately increase symptom-to-door time.

Health literacy and awareness: Decreased awareness of the prevalence of cardiovascular disease (CVD) in women is a critical factor contributing to disparities in care. Although CVD is the leading cause of death among women worldwide, it remains under recognized by both patients and providers. A 2014 survey by the Women's Heart Alliance found that 45% of women were unaware that CVD is their leading cause of death, and most primary care physicians did not rank CVD as a top health concern, prioritizing weight management and breast health instead.

== Biological factors ==
Women are impacted differently by heart disease due to several biological factors, including cardiac structure, patterns of vascular disease, hormonal influences, and unique female-specific risk factors.

Structurally, the female heart has smaller arteries and a thinner myocardium. In addition, women are more likely than men to develop disease in the smaller vessels rather than the larger coronary arteries. This condition, known as coronary microvascular disease, often presents differently than traditional CAD and requires providers to maintain a high index of suspicion.

Hormonal differences, particularly estrogen, also play a role. Women experience increased cardiovascular risk after menopause; however, clinical trials have not supported the use of HRT for primary or secondary prevention of cardiovascular disease.

Several cardiovascular risk factors are either more common in women or confer a disproportionately higher risk in women compared to men. These include autoimmune diseases, diabetes, smoking, mental health conditions, and metabolic syndrome. Additional risk factors are directly related to reproductive health and pregnancy, such as early menopause, gestational hypertension, pre-eclampsia, eclampsia, PCOS, and pre-term birth.

A lack of awareness of these biological differences and sex-specific risk factors may contribute to under recognition and delayed treatment of high-risk women, perpetuating the phenomenon known as Yentl Syndrome.

== Avoiding gender bias in cardiovascular healthcare ==
Several steps can be taken to continue improving the diagnosis, treatment, and outcomes for women with cardiovascular disease. These include changes at both the systemic and individual level such as:

Expand research and clinical trials focused on women's cardiovascular health.

Continue to mandate sex-specific reporting in studies of STEMI care and related interventions.

Provide guideline-directed medical therapy (GDMT) consistently to women, ensuring equitable application of evidence-based care.

Ensure adequate female representation in clinical trials to capture sex-specific outcomes.

Increase public awareness of women's cardiovascular health, particularly among women themselves, to improve understanding of personal risk and recognition of when to seek timely care.

Enhance provider education on the gender gap in STEMI outcomes and the unique cardiovascular risk factors in women, both in medical training and continuing education for practicing clinicians.
