= VIP syndrome =

Influence of a VIP on a professional's decisions

VIP syndrome is a term used to describe a situation when a perceived VIP uses their status to influence a given professional to make unorthodox decisions under the pressure or presence of the individual. The term can be applied to any profession which has relationships with wealthy, famous or powerful clients, particularly medical or airline professions.

== Examples ==
- Smolensk air disaster
- Eckwersheim derailment
- Borki train disaster
