= Snapping scapula syndrome =

- Specialty: Orthopedic
- Symptoms: Grating, grinding, popping or snapping sensation of the scapula onto the back side of the ribs or thoracic area of the spine" (Hauser)
- Causes: Common cases involve patients excessively using the overhead or throwing motion.
- Treatment: Non-surgical: physical therapy; anti-inflammatory medications; extreme cases include cortisone injection. Surgery may be used.

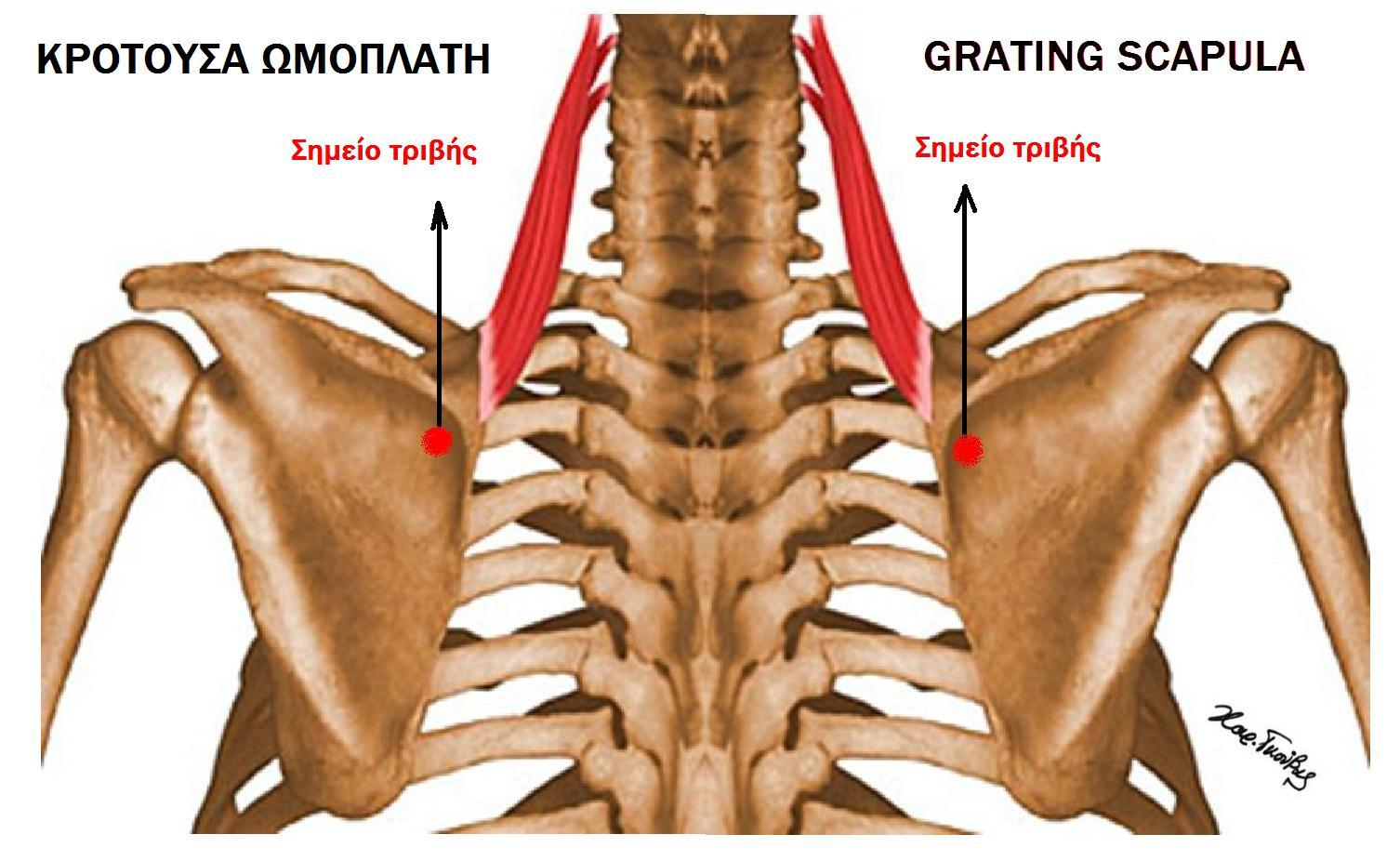
Snapping (grating) scapula

Snapping scapula syndrome, also known as scapulocostal syndrome or scapulothoracic syndrome, is described by a "grating, grinding, popping or snapping sensation of the scapula onto the back side of the ribs or thoracic area of the spine" (Hauser). Disruption of the normal scapulothoracic mechanics causes this problem. The most common cases are found in young, active patients who tend to excessively use the overhead or throwing motion.

== Cause ==
One source of snapping scapula is when the muscles underneath the scapula (the subscapularis muscle) atrophies. This causes the scapula to become very close to the rib cage, eventually causing rubbing or bumping during arm/shoulder movement. Another cause is bursitis, which is when the tissues between the shoulder blade and thoracic wall inflame. Muscle and bone abnormalities in the shoulder area can also contribute to the pain.

== Treatment ==
=== Non-surgical ===
Doctors often recommend physical therapy in order to strengthen the subscapularis muscle, and prescribe anti-inflammatory medications. For extreme cases, cortisone injections would be used.

=== Surgical ===
Surgery is usually only used if the non-surgical treatments have failed. Bone abnormalities may need surgical attention. The most common surgery for snapping scapula requires the surgeon to "take out a small piece of the upper corner of the scapula nearest to the spine."
