= McCusick syndrome =

- Specialty: Medical genetics

McCusick syndrome is characterized by short-limbed dwarfism and fine, sparse, hypoplastic, and dysmorphic hair.

== See also ==
- Skin lesion
