= Cotton fever =

Side effect of intravenous drug use

Cotton fever is a condition that indicates as a fever that follows intravenous drug use where cotton is used to filter the drugs. The condition derives from an endotoxin released by the bacterium Pantoea agglomerans which lives in cotton plants.

== Etymology ==
A condition similar to cotton fever was described in the early 1940s among cotton-farm workers. The term cotton fever was coined in 1975 after the syndrome was recognized in intravenous drug users.

== Signs and symptoms ==
Signs and symptoms of cotton fever usually appear within 20 minutes after injection, but may come on gradually over the course of a few hours. In addition to fever, they may include headaches, malaise, chills, nausea, extreme joint and muscle pain, a sudden onset of dull, sharp, piercing or burning back and kidney pain, tremors, anxiety, shortness of breath, and tachycardia. The fever itself usually reaches 38.5–40.3 °C (101.3–104.5 °F) during the full onset. Extreme chills and uncontrollable shivering are common. The symptoms of cotton fever resemble those of sepsis and patients can be initially misdiagnosed upon admission to a hospital.

== Diagnosis ==
Cotton fever may bear resemblance to other bodily infections such as the flu; a culture would be required to determine whether a particular patient has been infected by the specific bacterium (Pantoea agglomerans) that causes true cotton fever. Confusion continues to exist as outdated or inaccurate definitions of the condition, including its causes, remain widespread, especially among intravenous drug users, who are likely to self-diagnose based on local common knowledge.

Although it cannot be ruled out, cotton fever could possibly result from direct introduction of a small cotton fiber or other particulate matter into the bloodstream which may have attached itself to the tip of a used or blunted hypodermic needle. Another possibility is seen by the increased infection rate due to cotton particles introducing bacteria directly into the bloodstream. Cotton fever, or more specifically its symptoms, can also occur from injecting old blood back into the bloodstream. Though doing so doesn’t result in true cotton fever caused by enterobacter agglomerans, it results in presentation of cotton fever’s symptoms: fever, severe chills, myalgia, spasmodic muscles (especially those of the neck and back), tachycardia, profuse hidrosis, shortness of breath, lethargy, and fatigue. Intravenous injection of old blood cells can introduce myriad bacterium and/or microbes into one’s bloodstream as old blood, i.e. blood left behind in a previously used syringe, acts as a Petri dish for culturing such micro-organisms; nonetheless, a blood smear and/or culture must be performed to determine the specific pathogenic organism.

Cotton fever has specific symptoms that differentiate it from other ailments: fever, chills, and shortness of breath. In Europe, cotton fever is commonly called "the shakes"—a reference to another common symptom of cotton fever. Those with this ailment often experience violent shaking or shivering.

These symptoms normally occur immediately following an injection, but there are reports of lags of up to an hour in length.

Under most circumstances, cotton fever is quite benign, but it is possible for it to turn into something much more serious, like pneumonia. Normally, however, the symptoms of cotton fever disappear within a few hours.

== Treatment ==
Cotton fever rarely requires medical treatment but is sometimes warranted if the high fever does not break within a few hours of the onset. It will usually resolve itself within a day. Soaking in a warm bath along with a fever reducer can alleviate symptoms. Extreme cases (particularly severe or long-lasting) can be treated with antibiotics.
