= Cord colitis syndrome =

Medical condition

- Differential diagnosis: Graft-versus-host disease

Cord colitis syndrome is a diarrheal illness in recipients of umbilical cord blood transplant. It causes a granulomatous inflammation of the upper and lower gastrointestinal tract and responds to antimicrobial treatment including metronidazole. It was first described in 2011. In 2013, a sequencing study identified a newly discovered bacterium, called Bradyrhizobium enterica, in biopsy samples from two patients. That this bacterium is responsible for this syndrome can be suggested, but not yet confirmed. Subsequent studies showing that Bradyrhizobium species are common contaminants of laboratory kit reagents have thrown this connection into doubt.

== Diagnosis ==
The presence of enterica in the colon-biopsy samples has been suggested to help in identification of patients with cord colitis. However, this may be an erroneous report confounded by contamination, and others have not detected Bradyrhizobium in cord colitis samples. Patients with cord colitis syndrome frequently have granulomatous inflammation on upper and lower GI tract biopsies, along with chronic injury characteristics like distal colon Paneth cell metaplasia. Abdominal CT imaging typically reveals focal or diffuse thickening of the colonic wall, which is radiographically consistent with colitis.

== Treatment ==
Cord colitis syndrome responds quickly to antibacterial treatment, which is typically a fluoroquinolone and metronidazole. Relapse is common following the discontinuation of antibacterial agents and may necessitate lengthy treatment courses.
