= Froin's syndrome =

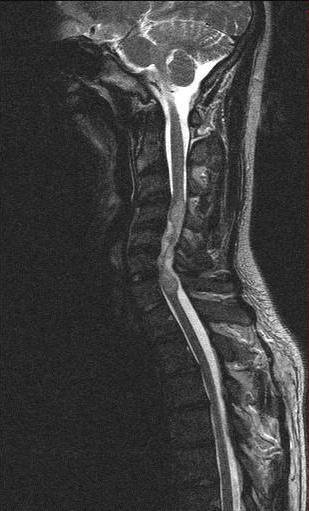
- Ependymoma of the cervical spine, completely obscurating the spinal canal

Froin's syndrome is the coexistence of xanthochromia, high protein level and marked coagulation of cerebrospinal fluid (CSF). It is caused by meningeal irritation (e.g. during spinal meningitis) and CSF flow blockage by tumour mass or abscess. Stagnation of the CSF within the thecal sac facilitates exudation from the tumour itself and activation of coagulation factors. A clinical test formerly used for evaluation of spinal stenosis is Queckenstedt's maneuver. Nowadays, a magnetic resonance imaging is used for identification of CSF flow obstruction. It often shows the prolongation of T1 and T2 signal in CSF caudal to a level of block. This phenomenon is named after Georges Froin (1874–1932), a French physician who first described it.
