= Sulfonamide hypersensitivity syndrome =

Sulfonamide hypersensitivity syndrome is similar to anticonvulsant hypersensitivity syndrome, but the onset is often sooner in the treatment course, generally after 7–14 days of therapy.

It is considered immune-mediated.

== See also ==
- List of cutaneous conditions
