= Floppy eyelid syndrome =

- Specialty: Ophthalmology

Floppy eyelid syndrome (FES) is a disease whose most prominent features often include floppy upper eyelids that can be easily everted, as well as papillary conjunctivitis. It is often associated with patients with high body mass index and obstructive sleep apnea.

Floppy eyelid syndrome is thought to revolve around the upregulation of elastin-degrading enzymes, as well as mechanical factors. These can cause instability of the eyelid scaffold, resulting in the malposition of the eyelid.
