= Split hand syndrome =

- Specialty: Neurological

In medicine, split hand syndrome is a neurological syndrome in which the hand muscles on the side of the thumb (lateral, thenar eminence) appear wasted, whereas the muscles on the side of the little finger (medial, hypothenar eminence) are spared. Anatomically, the abductor pollicis brevis and first dorsal interosseous muscle are more wasted than the abductor digiti minimi.

If lesions affecting the branches of the ulnar nerve that run to the wasted muscles are excluded, the lesion is almost sure to be located in the anterior horn of the spinal cord at the C8-T1 level. It has been proposed as a relatively specific sign for amyotrophic lateral sclerosis (ALS or Lou Gehrig's disease). It can also occur in other disorders affecting the anterior horn, such as spinal muscular atrophy, Charcot-Marie-Tooth disease, poliomyelitis and progressive muscular atrophy. A slow onset and a lack of pain or sensorial symptoms are arguments against a lesion of the spinal root or plexus brachialis. To an extent, these features can also be seen in normal aging (although technically, the apparent muscle wasting is sarcopenia rather than atrophy).

The term split hand syndrome was coined in 1994 by a researcher from the Cleveland Clinic called Asa J. Wilbourn.
