= Runting-stunting syndrome in broilers =

Medical condition in chicken

Runting-stunting syndrome in broilers is a syndrome described in broilers since the 1940s, but often with specific etiological appellations (viral enteritis, malabsorption syndrome, brittle bone disease, infectious pro ventriculitis, helicopter disease and pale bird syndrome). It consists of stunted growth in birds, which is clearly visible in the second month of growth (30–42 days).

== Symptoms ==
The mortality of the flock is unaffected, but a certain proportion of birds (1 to 10 percent) show decreased body weights ("runts") and elevated feed conversion. This leads to reduced uniformity of the flock.

== Aetiology ==
Causing agents may include:

- viruses: reovirus (often considered a unique cause), adenoviruses, enteroviruses, rotaviruses, parvoviruses.
- bacteria like Escherichia coli, Proteus mirabilis, Enterococcus faecium, Staphylococcus cohnii, Clostridium perfringens, Bacteroides fragilis and Bacillus licheniformis, often isolated in affected birds.

== Control ==
Reovirus vaccines are advocated (in dams or in broilers) but do not entirely solve the problem.

General hygiene and correct breeding conditions (especially correct brooding temperatures) may be efficient, but the disease often disappears as it had appeared, which makes it difficult to appreciate the effectiveness of control measures.
