= Grinspan's syndrome =

- Symptoms: cough and vomiting

Grinspan's syndrome is a syndrome characterized by presence of the triad essential hypertension, diabetes mellitus, and oral lichen planus.

Oral lichen planus is thought to be a result of the drugs used for treatment of hypertension and diabetes mellitus but this is not confirmed.
