= Retirement syndrome =

Retirement syndrome is a term coined by author and clinical professor of leadership development at INSEAD, Manfred F.R. Kets de Vries, to describe the difficulties faced by individuals in positions of authority, specifically chief executive officers (CEOs) as they attempt to "let go" at the end of a full career.

The syndrome, also classified by Kets de Vries as the "CEO blues", is an insistence by individuals in positions of leadership or authority to remain in power, despite reaching a plateau in their careers. Individuals in this position may experience feelings of having accomplished all that can be accomplished, and a lack of creativity, or lack of lustre in their current position. Effects are most strongly felt by those who reach a position of power earlier on in their lifetime as they will spend a much greater amount of time on the down slope towards retirement, as opposed to individuals who reach the top in their later years.

Effects may also be credited to a realization by CEOs who have reached this plateau of the losses they may endure upon their retirement including:

- the loss of work
- the loss of health and vitality
- the loss of public exposure and public contact
- loss of influence, power, attention, and admiration
- loss of financial stability

As well as a desire to avoid difficult situations in which they may be required to confront the sacrifices they made on their way to the top -a fulfilling personal life, healthy relationships with spouse, children and friends, and time to develop outside contacts and interests.

== Psychological effects ==
=== Physical and psychological effects of ageing ===
The physical effects of ageing- wrinkles, grey hair, balding, dental problems, a need for glasses (stronger prescription), are coupled with a self-consciousness about the deterioration of the body. This can lead to a search for outlets that can act as substitutes for attractiveness. For leaders especially, maintaining power may be viewed as a substitute for the attractiveness that has been lost throughout the years. Leaders with narcissistic tendencies, are also more likely to feel the psychological effects of ageing as they may experience a heightened sense of injury when the physical effects of ageing become apparent.

=== Experience of nothingness ===
The experience of nothingness is a psychological concept that is characterized by negative emotions such as feelings of meaningless, helplessness, feeling of existing in a vacuum, and a loss of control. It is a phenomenon that is experienced by some individuals facing retirement. It is much more prominent if they feel as though their leadership is the only thing that gives their life meaning or a purpose. And with the loss of their job their life would then consequently lose the only purpose and meaning leading into the experience of nothingness. Many individuals in this position often may not have anyone to turn to for emotional support, and will therefore cling to their position of power for as long as possible.

=== Talion principle ===
The lex talionis or talion principle, often referred to as the "eye for an eye" principle can be applied in the case of individuals facing retirement. This principle established in early Babylonian law, expresses the belief that criminals should be punished exactly as they had inflicted upon their victims. In the case of retirees, paranoia may ensue when it comes time for this shift in power, as they are consciously aware as leaders of the individuals who may attempt to retaliate or take revenge against them for leadership decisions taken during their careers that may have affected the happiness or well-being of one or more of these individuals.

=== Edifice complex ===
The edifice complex is a sense that with retirement comes the end of a legacy. More deeply felt when at the unconscious level, leaving a lasting legacy is equated with defeating death. In a way, difficulty in letting go of this legacy, and a desire to remain in power for as long as possible, may be seen in the broader sense as a difficulty facing mortality. When power begins to shift in the organization, a CEO may go through the stages of anger, sadness, and depression, which can lead to serious second thoughts in their decision to retire their position. On the other hand, leaders who are committed to their organization and actively try to find a capable successor to carry on after their retirement generally experience less difficulty in letting go.
