= ANOTHER syndrome =

- Other names: Hypohidrotic ectodermal dysplasia-hypothyroidism-ciliary dyskinesia syndrome
- This condition is inherited in an autosomal recessive manner
- Specialty: Dermatology
- Symptoms: sparse hair, abnormal dentition and hypohidrosis
- Usual onset: Presents in early childhood with progressive respiratory decline and eventual failure
- Treatment: Supportive therapy with consideration of lung transplantation and dental implants

ANOTHER syndrome consists of alopecia, nail dystrophy, ophthalmic complications, thyroid dysfunction, hypohidrosis, ephelides and enteropathy, and respiratory tract infections. It is an autosomal recessive variant of ectodermal dysplasia.

== Epidemiology and pathogenesis ==
Ectodermal dysplasia has a rare incidence estimated between 1/10,000 – 1/100,000 births. The most common subclass is HED, characterized by absence or significantly reduced exocrine glands. The mode of inheritance is usually X-linked recessive traits carried by a female carrier manifesting in males. Mutations in the EDA, EDAR, and EDARADD genes are known to cause HED, encoding for proteins critical during the embryonic development of the ectoderm and mesoderm. The gene EDA accounts for 95% of cases of HED. The genes EDAR and EDARADD are also known to cause rare autosomal dominant and recessive forms of HED, which ANOTHER syndrome falls under. This subclass of mutations accounts for 5% of HED.

== Pathology ==
Lung biopsy often demonstrates multifocal bronchiectasis with areas of peribronchial fibrosis.

== Symptoms ==
Symptoms present in early childhood and can include sparse hair, abnormal dentition and hypohidrosis, heat intolerance, asthma, eczema, glaucoma, recurrent respiratory infections, and recurrent unexplained fevers.

== Diagnosis ==
Clinical diagnosis occurs in the setting of episodes of hyperpyrexia with associated physical exam findings of hypodontia, sparse hair, unexplained allergic skin rashes and recurrent respiratory infections. Definitive diagnosis occurs based on Molecular genetic testing for mutations in the described genes above, and the distribution and number of sweat pores and amount of sweat produced.

== Treatment ==
Multidisciplinary, collaborative supportive therapy that may include close follow up with ENT, SLP, pulmonologist, and dentists. Cases involving severe pulmonary complication can be considered for lung transplantation.

== See also ==
- Skin lesion
- List of cutaneous conditions
