= Propofol infusion syndrome =

- Propofol

Propofol infusion syndrome (PRIS) is a rare syndrome which affects patients undergoing long-term treatment with high doses of the anaesthetic and sedative drug propofol. It can lead to cardiac failure, rhabdomyolysis, metabolic acidosis, and kidney failure, and is often fatal. High blood potassium, high blood triglycerides, and liver enlargement, proposed to be caused by either "a direct mitochondrial respiratory chain inhibition or impaired mitochondrial fatty acid metabolism", are also key features. It is associated with high doses and long-term use of propofol (> 4 mg/kg/h for more than 24 hours). It occurs more commonly in children, and critically ill patients receiving catecholamines and glucocorticoids are at high risk. Treatment is supportive. Early recognition of the syndrome and discontinuation of the propofol infusion reduces morbidity and mortality. Metabolic acidosis is a primary feature and may be the first laboratory evidence of the syndrome.

== Presentation ==
The syndrome clinically presents as acute refractory bradycardia that leads to asystole, in the presence of one or more of the following conditions: metabolic acidosis, rhabdomyolysis, hyperlipidemia, and enlarged liver. The association between PRIS and propofol infusions is generally noted at infusions higher than 4 mg/kg per hour for greater than 48 hours.

== Mechanism of action ==
The mechanism of action is poorly understood but may involve the impairment of mitochondrial fatty acid metabolism by propofol.

PRIS is a rare complication of propofol infusion. It is generally associated with high doses (>4 mg/kg per hour or >67 mcg/kg per minute) and prolonged use (>48 hours) though it has been reported with high-dose short-term infusions.

Additional proposed risk factors include a young age, critical illness, high fat and low carbohydrate intake, inborn errors of mitochondrial fatty acid oxidation, and concomitant catecholamine infusion or steroid therapy. Characteristics of PRIS include acute refractory bradycardia, severe metabolic acidosis, cardiovascular collapse, rhabdomyolysis, hyperlipidemia, renal failure, and hepatomegaly.

The incidence of PRIS is unknown, but it is probably less than 1 percent. Mortality is variable but high (33 to 66 percent). Treatment involves discontinuation of the propofol infusion and supportive care.

== Risk factors ==
Predisposing factors seem to include young age, severe critical illness of central nervous system or respiratory origin, exogenous catecholamine or glucocorticoid administration, inadequate carbohydrate intake and subclinical mitochondrial disease.

== Treatment ==
Treatment options are limited and are usually supportive, including hemodialysis with cardiorespiratory support.
