= Rud syndrome =

- X-linked recessive inheritance
- Symptoms: RUDS

Rud syndrome is a poorly characterized disorder, probably of X-linked recessive inheritance, named after Einar Rud who described 2 patients with the case in 1927 and 1929. It was argued that all reported cases of Rud syndrome are genetically heterogeneous and significantly differ from the original case reports of Rud and that the designation Rud syndrome should be eliminated and that the patients with such diagnosis should be reassigned to other syndromes, such as Refsum disease and Sjögren-Larsson syndrome. Some consider Rud syndrome and Sjögren-Larsson syndrome the same entity and that Rud syndrome does not exist.

== Presentation ==
While inclusion criteria for Rud syndrome have varied considerably, the major manifestations include congenital ichthyosis, hypogonadism, small stature, mental retardation, and epilepsy. Ocular findings were inconsistently reported and included strabismus, blepharoptosis, blepharospasm, glaucoma, cataract, nystagmus, and retinitis pigmentosa. Other systemic includes metabolic, bony, neurologic, and muscular abnormalities.

== Eponym ==
In 1929, the Danish physician Einar Rud described a 22-year-old Danish male had ichthyosis, hypogonadism, short stature, epilepsy, anemia, and polyneuritis. In 1929, he described a 29-year-old female with ichthyosis, hypogonadism, partial gigantism, and diabetes mellitus.
