= Persistent adrenarche syndrome =

- Other names: Adrenal SAHA syndrome
- Specialty: Dermatology

Persistent adrenarche syndrome is a cutaneous condition seen typically in thin young women who report great psychological and physical stress in their lives.

== See also ==
- SAHA syndrome
- List of cutaneous conditions
