= Oculo-respiratory syndrome =

Temporary condition caused by influenza immunization

Oculo-respiratory syndrome (ORS) is a usually transient condition characterized by bilateral conjunctivitis, facial edema, and upper respiratory symptoms following influenza immunization. Symptoms typically appear 2 to 24 hours after vaccination and resolve within 48-72 hours of onset. If any combination of symptoms occur after influenza vaccination a general practitioner should be consulted about the potential adverse effect to the vaccination. ORS first arose in the 2000-2001 flu season in Canada. This was due to a manufacturing error in the trivalent influenza vaccine (TIV) and has since been resolved. This condition has only been recorded mostly among middle-aged white women in Canada, however, the reasoning behind this phenomenon is still not yet known. This condition can be resolved with over-the-counter pain medication and cough medication in order to alleviate the symptoms. This is a relatively rare condition that arose out of this manufacturing error in the vaccination and has not been reported since the 2000-2001 flu season.

== Signs and symptoms ==
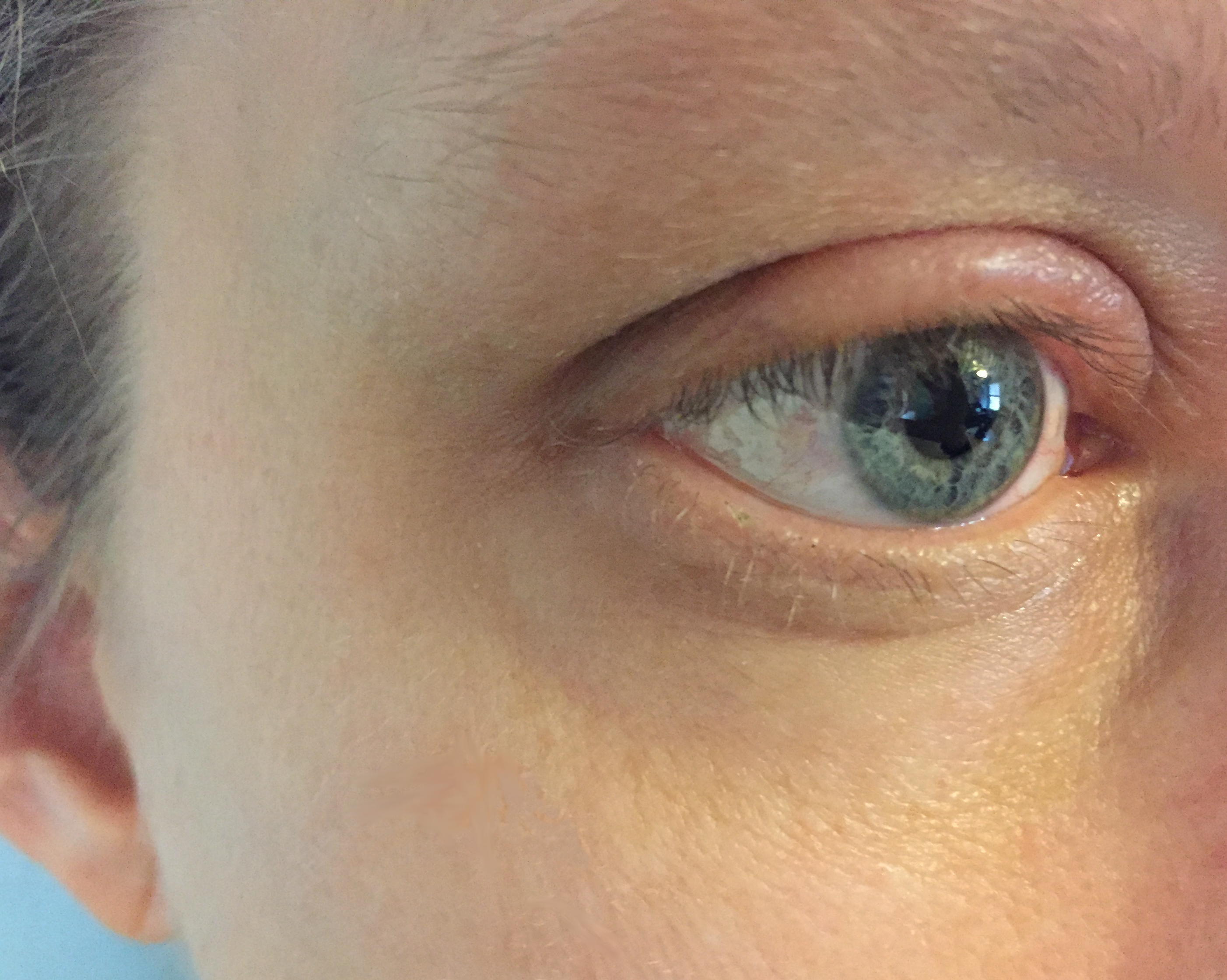
Presentation of swollen eye lids

The most common symptoms of ORS are bilateral red eyes, facial edema, or respiratory symptoms as described in the table below. These symptoms typically occur 2-24 hours after administration of the vaccine and they are resolved between 48-72 hours of onset. Any combination of symptoms will diagnose ORS. The symptoms experienced mimic those of any flu vaccination however they are a little more moderate; though there have not been any reported cases of hospitalization due to ORS symptoms.

Affected Area	Symptoms
Eyes	bilateral red eyes
Face	swollen eyes lids, swollen lips, swollen tongue
Respiratory	coughing, wheezing, sore throat, difficulty breathing, difficulty swallowing, horseness, chest tightness

== Cause ==
The cause of ORS is the influenza vaccine. Studies have shown that the cases from the 2000-2001 flu season related ORS to TIV. When investigated further, a manufacturing error occurred in the vaccines. Upon investigation using electron microscopy, the vaccine presented with a disproportionate number of virion aggregates that were unsplit in the vaccine. Coupled with the manufacturing error, the patients who presented with ORS were tested for cytokine levels in peripheral blood after vaccination. The study concluded that those who had ORS presented with elevated levels of IL-10 and IL-3 and that amount was constant for 9-12 months after. This indicated that the vaccine did not cause the elevated amounts of IL-10 and IL-3, the population of people was predisposed to ORS.

== Mechanism ==
The underlying mechanism for ORS is not yet known, the research demonstrates that there is a correlation between contracting ORS and having elevated amounts of IL-10 and IL-3. These immune cells are important for inflammation in the body. Although studies show that patients with elevated IL-10 and IL-3 are predisposed to contracting ORS, the elevated amounts of these cells are in line with the symptoms patients have presented with. As the body is fighting off this condition and there is inflammation of both the respiratory system and in the face these immune cells would need to work extra hard to combat the inflammation in these affected areas.

In the respiratory system, there is inflammation of the lungs and/or the airway that leads from the mouth to the lungs when contracting ORS. When there is inflammation, anywhere in the body, the body's reaction to this is to send white blood cells and immune cells to control the inflammation. This is where the IL-10 and IL-3 cells come in. When the body is fighting off an infection and /or inflammation there are high levels of white blood cells and immune cells because they are working overtime to contain the infection/inflammation. Since the inflammation in the respiratory tract is more internal, this process of fighting off inflammation can be seen more in patients who present with facial edema. The inflammation of the face triggers these immune cells to come to the sight of inflammation and try and suppress this issue before it becomes severe. The main symptom in this condition is inflammation of the affected area whether that be the conjunctiva in the eyes, the face, or the respiratory tract. With these issues, the body must attack the inflammation by increasing the amount of immune cells (IL-10 and IL-3) to suppress this inflammation.

== Diagnosis ==
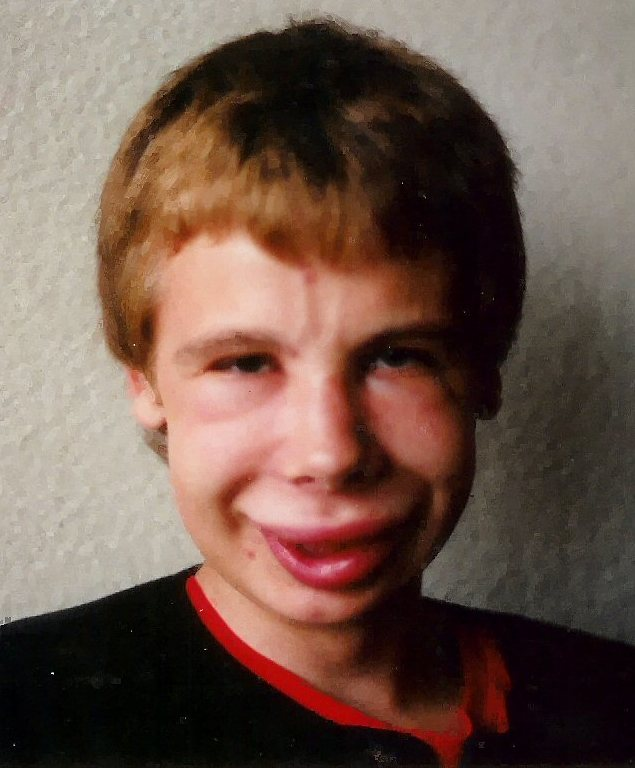
Presentation of a child with facial edema

ORS is categorized by a combination of symptoms. Symptoms appear within 2-24 hours after influenza vaccine's injection.

The diagnosis of ORS is done by a general practitioner. The diagnosis is symptom-based and by providing the practitioner a medical history. A practitioner will check the symptoms and check when the vaccine was administered to provide a proper diagnosis. A physical exam, consisting of inspection of the eyes and throat as well as auscultation, might be done as well to rule out a potential diagnosis.

== Treatment ==
The focus of the treatment of ORS is to alleviate symptoms. Over-the-counter cough or pain medication is advised to be taken as needed. However, ORS is considered mild and to be self-resolving. There have been some reported hospitalizations due to ORS, though they were seen in the elderly.

== Prognosis ==
The risk of recurrence of ORS is higher during revaccination. However, the risk of recurrence is symptom-based:

- those who had ORS and did not experience any respiratory symptoms are safe to get reimmunized against influenza
- those who had ORS and did experience respiratory symptoms should consult a physician before immunization

Symptoms after recurrence are less severe after revaccination. Those who are 60 years old and above are at risk of recurrence.

== Epidemiology ==
Global map of Canada

There have been limited cases involving ORS; however, from the cases, it was noted that this condition affected women more than men and was typical in people 40-59 years old. These cases arose in Canada during the 2000-2001 flu season and were seen primarily in white Canadians. There was a similar issue that occurred in Europe in the mid 1990's however this was not ORS. The reason why white Canadian women in their 40s and 50s are more susceptible to this condition is still not yet known.

== Recent research ==
The current logo used by Pfizer

The current logo used by Moderna.m

Recent research has seen a correlation between the COVID-19 vaccine and some ocular symptoms. Although not linked to ORS, symptoms are similar. It was reported that the most common ocular symptom was ocular inflammation with ocular neuritis coming in a close second. A study demonstrated that these symptoms were linked to the Pfizer-BioNTech vaccine with ocular neuritis also being linked to the Moderna vaccine. Although studies have not found the root of the cause, further research is being conducted to find an underlying cause as to why these COVID-19 vaccines are demonstrating these symptoms.
