= Velum =

Velum may refer to:

== Human anatomy ==
- Superior medullary velum, anterior medullary velum or valve of Vieussens, white matter, in the brain, which stretches between the superior cerebellar peduncles
  - Frenulum of superior medullary velum, a slightly raised white band passing to the superior medullary velum
- Inferior medullary velum or posterior medullary velum, a thin layer of white substance, prolonged from the white center of the cerebellum
- Velum interpositum or choroid plexus, a structure in the brain where cerebrospinal fluid is produced
  - Cavum veli interpositi, a condition in which the cistern of the velum interpositum becomes dilated
- Palatal velum or soft palate, the soft tissue constituting the back of the roof of the mouth
  - Levator velum palatini muscle or levator veli palatini, the elevator muscle of the soft palate

== Nature ==
- Cumulonimbus velum, a cloud type
- Solemya velum, or Atlantic awning clam
- Agrotis velum or lycophotia molothina, a moth
- Velum or veil (mycology), one of several structures in fungi
- Velum, a morphological feature of quillworts
- Velum, the locomotory and feeding organ found in the larval veliger stage of bivalves

== Architecture ==
- Velarium, also known as velum, a textile overhang used in Roman times

== See also ==
- Vellum, animal skin that is similar to parchment and that is used as medium for writing, book printing, and book binding
