= Cavum veli interpositi =

Medical condition of the brain

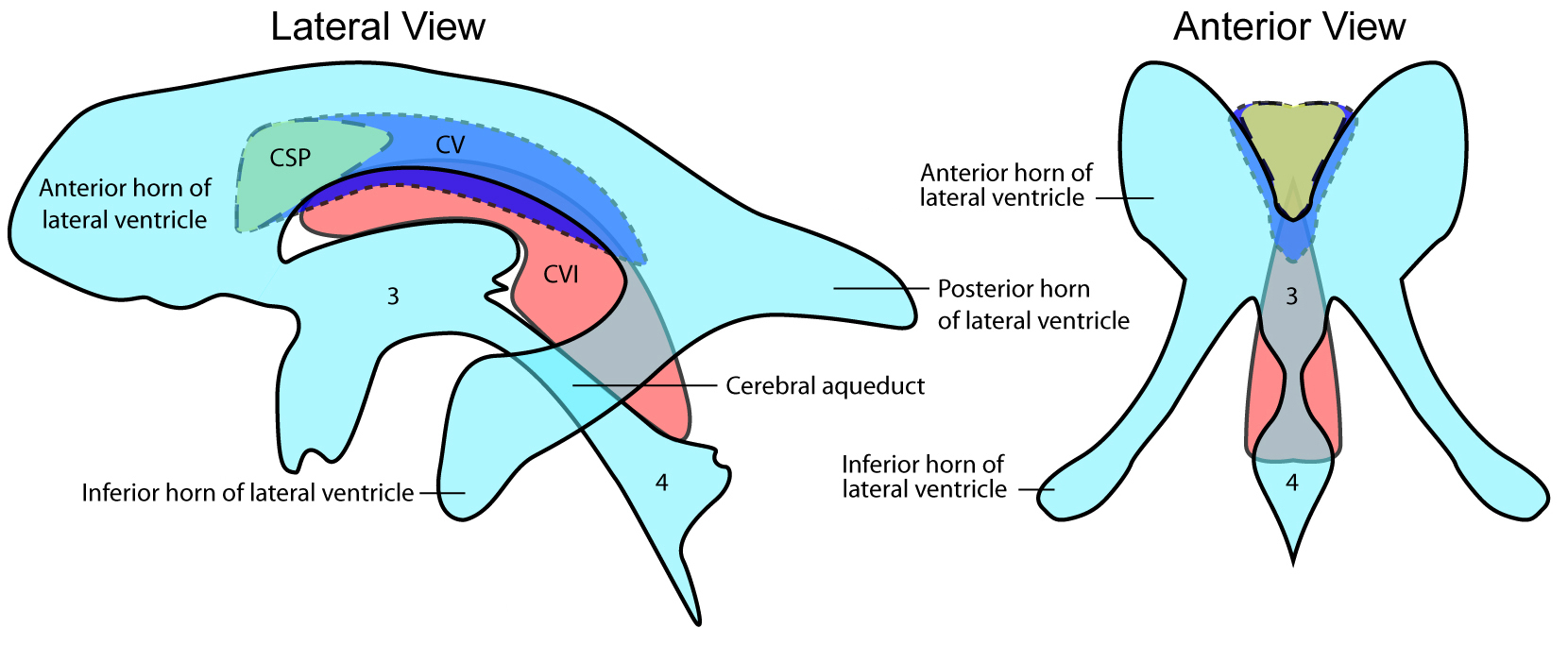
- Difference between cavum septi pellucidi (CSP), cavum Vergae (CV), and cavum veli interpositi (CVI). 3=third ventricle, 4=fourth ventricle.

In the brain, the cavum veli interpositi (CVI) is a condition in which the cistern of the velum interpositum becomes dilated. The phenomenon usually occurs in newborns.

Axial MR/CT show a triangular-shaped cerebrospinal fluid (CSF) space between the lateral ventricles. On sagittal images, CVI can appear as a slit-like, linear-to-round/ovoid CSF collection below the fornices, and above the 3rd ventricle.

There are usually no associated abnormalities, although larger lesions may cause an obstructive hydrocephalus. No treatment is usually necessary.

== See also ==
- Cavum Vergae
- Cavum septi pellucidi
