= Eminence (anatomy) =

Protuberance from an anatomical structure

In anatomy, eminence implies a protuberance, and may refer to a variety of structures:

- Collateral eminence, alongside the hippocampus in the brain
- Cruciform eminence, in the occipital bone of the skull
- Frontal eminence, on the frontal bone of the skull
- Hypothenar eminence, a group of three palmar muscles that control the pinky finger
- Iliopubic eminence, in the pelvis
- Intercondylar eminence, in the tibia bone of the leg
- Medial eminence, in the rhomboid fossa of the fourth ventricle of the brain
- Median eminence, below the hypothalamus of the brain
- Müllerian eminence, in the cloaca of an embryo
- Parietal eminence, in the parietal bone of the skull
- Pyramidal eminence, in the middle ear
- Thenar eminence, muscle on the thumb side of the hand
