= Hall–Riggs syndrome =

- Radiograph of a 9-year-old child with the condition showing dysplastic changes of the epiphyses and metaphyses within his knees
- Specialty: Medical genetics
- Symptoms: skeletal dysplasia, facial deformities, intellectual disabilities
- Onset: Birth
- Duration: Lifelong
- Causes: Autosomal recessive genetic disorder
- Frequency: 0.0001%

Hall–Riggs syndrome is a rare genetic disorder that causes neurological issues and birth defects. People with Hall–Riggs syndrome usually have skeletal dysplasia, facial deformities, and intellectual disabilities. Only eight cases from two families worldwide have been described in medical literature. It is an autosomal recessive genetic disorder, meaning both parents must carry the gene in order for their offspring to be affected.

Common characteristics of Hall–Riggs syndrome include:

- spondyloepimetaphyseal dysplasia
- short stature
- shortened limbs, fingers, and toes
- microcephaly
- scoliosis
- seizures
- widened nasal bridge and mouth
- other dysmorphic facial features
- intellectual disabilities
- recurrent vomiting episodes

== Cases ==
- 1975: Hall and Riggs describe 6 out of 15 children born to consanguineous parents. Said children had severe intellectual deficit, microcephaly, facial dysmorphisms consisting of nostril anteversion, depressed nasal bridge and large lips, and progressive dysplasia of the skeletal system, including scoliosis, flattened femoral heads, shortened femoral necks, shortened proximal segments of the arms, growth delays, and epiphyseal flattening affecting the fingers and ankles. Said children didn't acquire the ability of speech even in adulthood. The parents of the 15 children were healthy, unaffected first-cousins.
- 2000: Silengo and Rigardetto describe two Italian siblings of the opposite sex born to healthy, unaffected non-consanguineous parents. Said children had the same symptoms as the previously described family alongside short stature and hypertelorbitism, Spondylometaphyseal dysplasia and mild epiphyseal changes were confirmed through radiographs. MRI findings included the presence of cavum vergae and multiple cysts in the septum pellucidum. EEGs came back abnormal. High-resolution karyotypes came back normal. The brother had a history of seizures and psychomotor instability and agitation. Other symptoms included brachydactyly type D, dorsal kyphosis, platyspondyly, enamel hypoplasia, coarse and thick hair, and feeding difficulties.
