= Choroid glomus =

Details

Identifiers
- Latin: glomus choroideum
- TA98: A14.1.09.283; A14.1.01.308
- TA2: 5655

The choroid glomus or glomus choroideum is an enlargement of the choroid plexus located in the atrium of each lateral ventricle. They are commonly calcified in adults and can easily be seen as a bright tufts on CT imaging. Their main purpose is for the secretion of cerebrospinal fluid (CSF).
