= Cave of septum pellucidum =

Slit-like space in the septum pellucidum

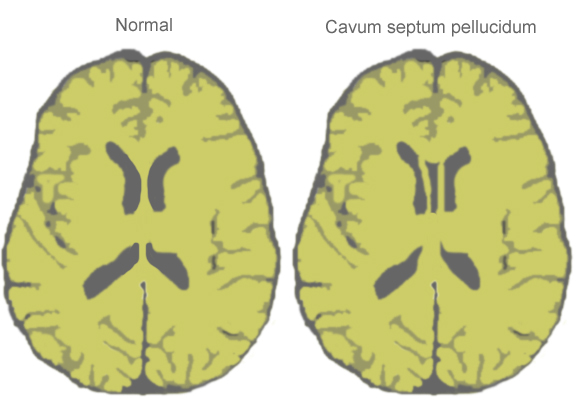
- Normal brain and cave of septum pellucidum as shown on a stylized horizontal section through the brain

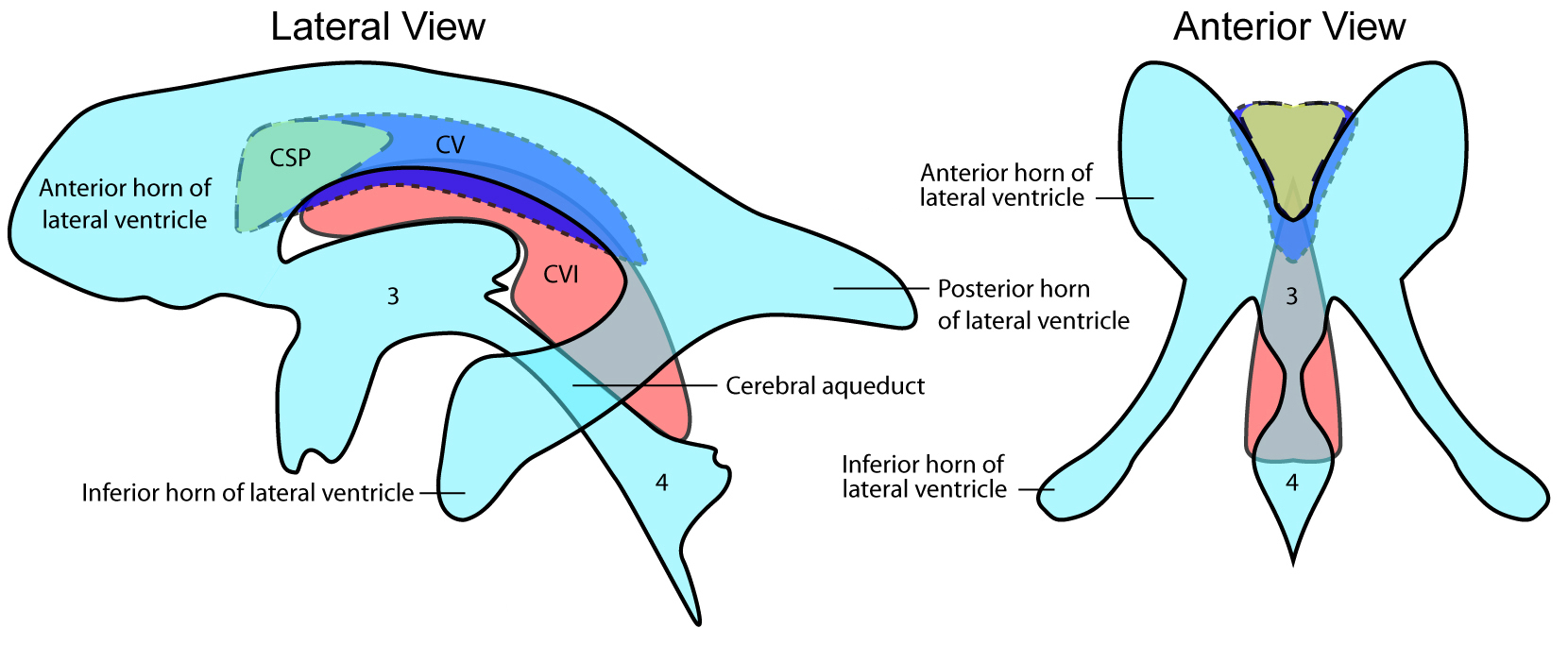
- Difference between cave of septum pellucidum (CSP), cavum Vergae (CV) and cavum veli interpositi (CVI); 3 = third ventricle 4 = fourth ventricle

Details

Identifiers
- Latin: Cavum septi pellucidi
- TA98: A14.1.09.263
- TA2: 5648
- FMA: 61874

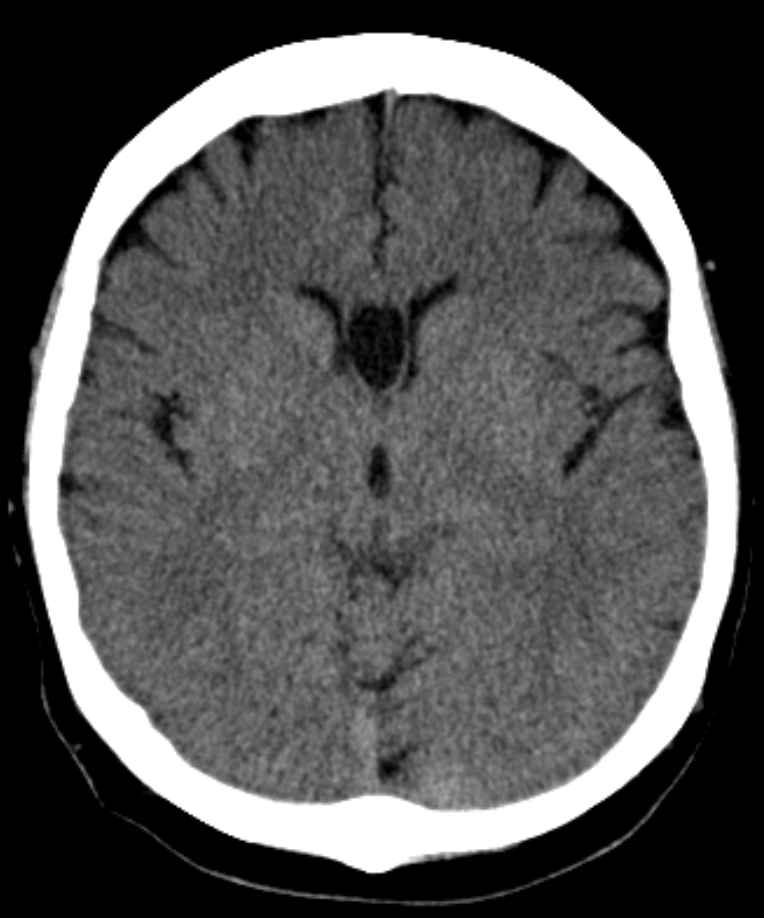
Cave of septum pellucidum seen on CT

The cave of septum pellucidum (CSP), cavum septi pellucidi, or cavity of septum pellucidum, also known as the ventricle of Sylvius, is a slit-like space in the septum pellucidum that is present in fetuses but usually fuses during infancy. The septum pellucidum is a thin, laminated translucent vertical membrane in the midline of the brain separating the anterior horns of the right and left lateral ventricles. It lies posterior to the corpus callosum. Persistence of the cave of septum pellucidum after infancy has been loosely associated with neural maldevelopment and several mental disorders that correlate with decreased brain tissue.

The cave of septum pellucidum is bounded anteriorly by the genu of the corpus callosum, superiorly by the body of the corpus callosum, posteriorly by the anterior limb and pillars of the fornix, inferiorly by the anterior commissure and the rostrum of the corpus callosum, and laterally by the leaflets of the septum pellucidum.

In prenatal development of the fetus, the laminae of the septum pellucidum separate to form a small cavity – the cave of septum pellucidum. This is an important normal structure to identify in the sonographic assessment of the fetal brain. In post-natal life, the laminae of the septum pellucidum usually fuse, which obliterates the cavum. The cavity contains cerebrospinal fluid (CSF) that filters from the ventricles through the septal laminae.

There are individual differences in the degree of CSP; whereas some have complete closure of the cavum, others present with a small degree (4–6 mm wide, in the coronal plane) of incomplete closure. The most common type of CSP is noncommunicating; that is, it does not connect to the brain's ventricular system. Because of this lack of communication, the previous use of the term "fifth ventricle" is no longer used, and the fifth ventricle is the name often used for the terminal ventricle.

CSP is present in 100% of fetuses, but over 85% of them fuse by 3–6 months after birth.

== Cause ==
The cause of persisting CSP is basically unknown, although it is thought that prenatal alcohol exposure plays a significant role.

== Marker for fetal neural maldevelopment ==
CSP is a marker for fetal neural maldevelopment. The septum pellucidum is a thin, triangular, vertical membrane separating the anterior horns of the left and right lateral ventricles of the brain. It runs as a sheet from the corpus callosum down to the fornix. During fetal development at approximately the twelfth week of gestation, a space forms between two laminae, which is the CSP. At approximately the twentieth week of gestation, the laminae start to close. This closure ends shortly after birth (3–6 months postnatally). Fusion of the CSP is attributed to rapid development of the alvei of the hippocampus, amygdala, septal nuclei, fornix, corpus callosum and other midline structures. Lack of such limbic development interrupts this posterior-to-anterior fusion, resulting in preservation of the CSP into adulthood.

== Association with mental disorders ==
CSP has been loosely associated with schizophrenia, post-traumatic stress disorder, traumatic brain injury, as well as with antisocial personality disorder. CSP is one of the distinguishing features of individuals displaying symptoms of dementia pugilistica (chronic traumatic encephalopathy).

== Cysts ==
A cavum septum pellucidum (CSP) cyst is defined as a cystic structure with a width of at least 10 mm in the septum's region, whose walls exhibit lateral bowling. Cysts within the cave of septum pellucidum are rare, with an incidence of 0.04%. CSP cysts can be classified as communicating and noncommunicating, with communicating referring to its ability to communicate with the ventricles. Noncommunicating cysts can become communicating if they spontaneously rupture, if head trauma occurs, through surgery, or during a diagnostic procedure. Communicating cysts can become non-communicating through fibrosis at the site of communication.

== References in film ==
- In the 1990 film, Rocky V, a destitute Rocky Balboa visits a doctor before competing in any further boxing matches. A brain scan reveals that he has cavum septi pellucidi brought on by head trauma, especially after his last fight with Ivan Drago. His wife Adrian urges him to retire, and he reluctantly does so.

== See also ==
- Cavum veli interpositi
