= Prepontine cistern =

Subarachnoid cistern in front of the pons

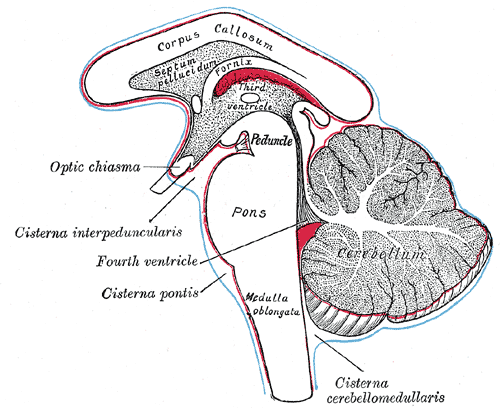
- Diagram showing the positions of the three principal subarachnoid cisternæ. (Cisterna pontis labeled at left center.)

- Scheme of roof of fourth ventricle. The arrow is in the foramen of Majendie. 1: Inferior medullary velum 2: Choroid plexus 3: Cerebellomedullary cistern of subarachnoid cavity 4: Central canal 5: Corpora quadrigemina 6: Cerebral peduncle 7: superior medullary velum 8: Ependymal lining of ventricle 9: Prepontine cistern of subarachnoid cavity

Details

Identifiers
- Latin: cisterna pontis
- NeuroNames: 556

The prepontine cistern, or pontine cistern is one of the subarachnoid cisterns situated ventral to the pons. It contains the basilar artery. Each lateral aperture opens into the pontine cistern just posterior to the cranial nerve VIII.

== Anatomy ==
The pontine cistern is situated ventral to the pons, in the interval between ventral aspect of the pons, and the clivus.

=== Contents ===
The cistern contains the origin of the abducens nerve (CN VI), the basilar artery and the origin of the basilar artery and of its branches, and the anterior inferior cerebellar artery, and superior cerebellar artery.

=== Relations ===
It is continuous inferiorly with the subarachnoid space of the spinal canal, posterolaterally with the cerebellopontine cistern of either side, and rostrally/anteriorly with the interpeduncular cistern.
