= Lingula of cerebellum =

Part of the cerebellum

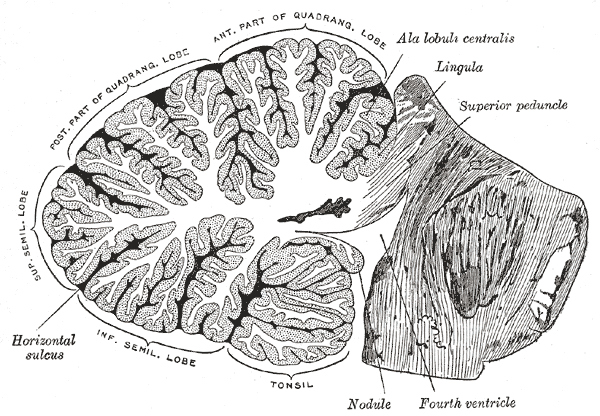
- Sagittal section of the cerebellum, near the junction of the vermis with the hemisphere. (Lingula labeled at upper right.)

Details

Identifiers
- Latin: lingula cerebelli
- NeuroNames: 657
- NeuroLex ID: birnlex_932
- TA98: A14.1.07.103
- TA2: 5820
- FMA: 83884

The lingula is a small tongue-shaped process, consisting of four or five folia; it lies in front of the central lobule, and is concealed by it.

Anteriorly, it rests on the dorsal surface of the superior medullary velum, and its white substance is continuous with that of the velum.

== Additional images ==
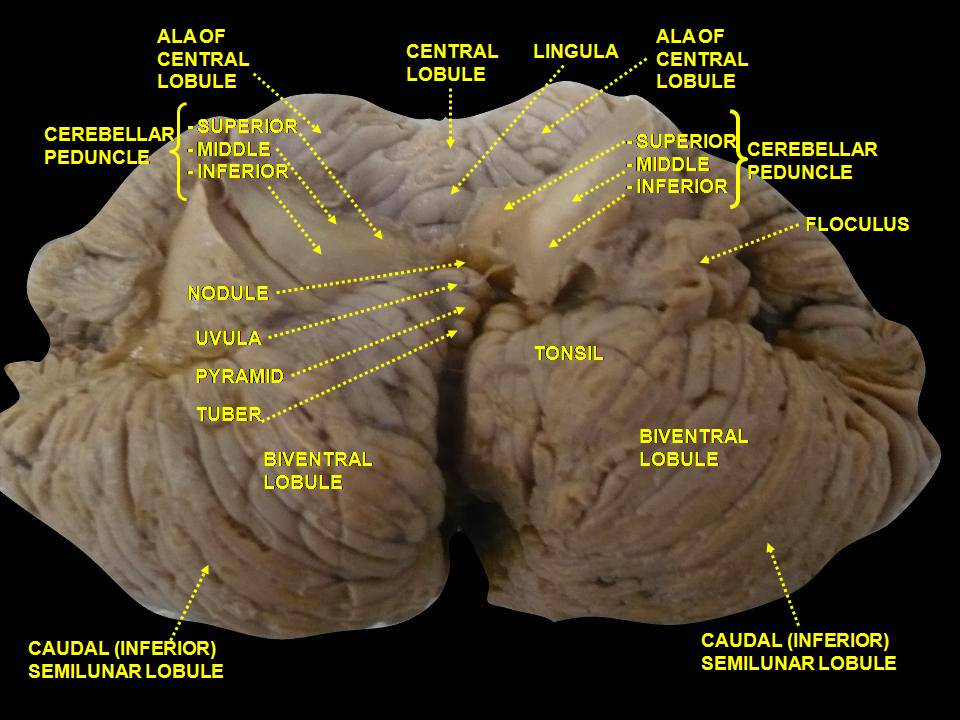
Cerebellum. Inferior surface.

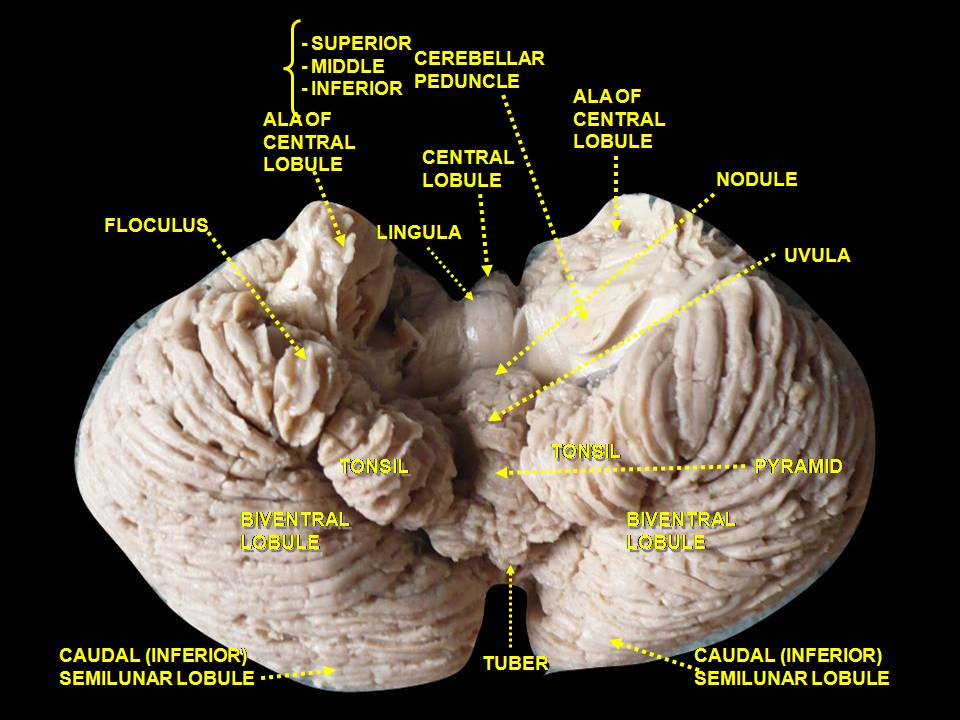
Cerebellum. Inferior surface.
