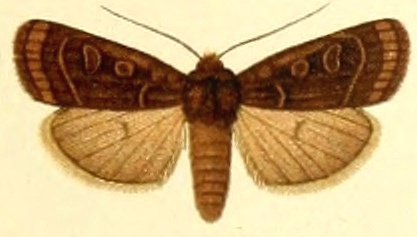

Scientific classification
- Domain: Eukaryota
- Kingdom: Animalia
- Phylum: Arthropoda
- Class: Insecta
- Order: Lepidoptera
- Superfamily: Noctuoidea
- Family: Noctuidae
- Genus: Lycophotia
- Species: L. velata

Binomial name
- Lycophotia velata (Staudinger, 1888)

Synonyms
- Agrotis velata Staudinger, 1888; Euxoa velata (Staudinger, 1888); ?Pseudohermonassa velata

= Lycophotia velata =

Species of moth

Lycophotia velata is a moth of the family Noctuidae. It is found in eastern Asia, including Siberia and Japan.
