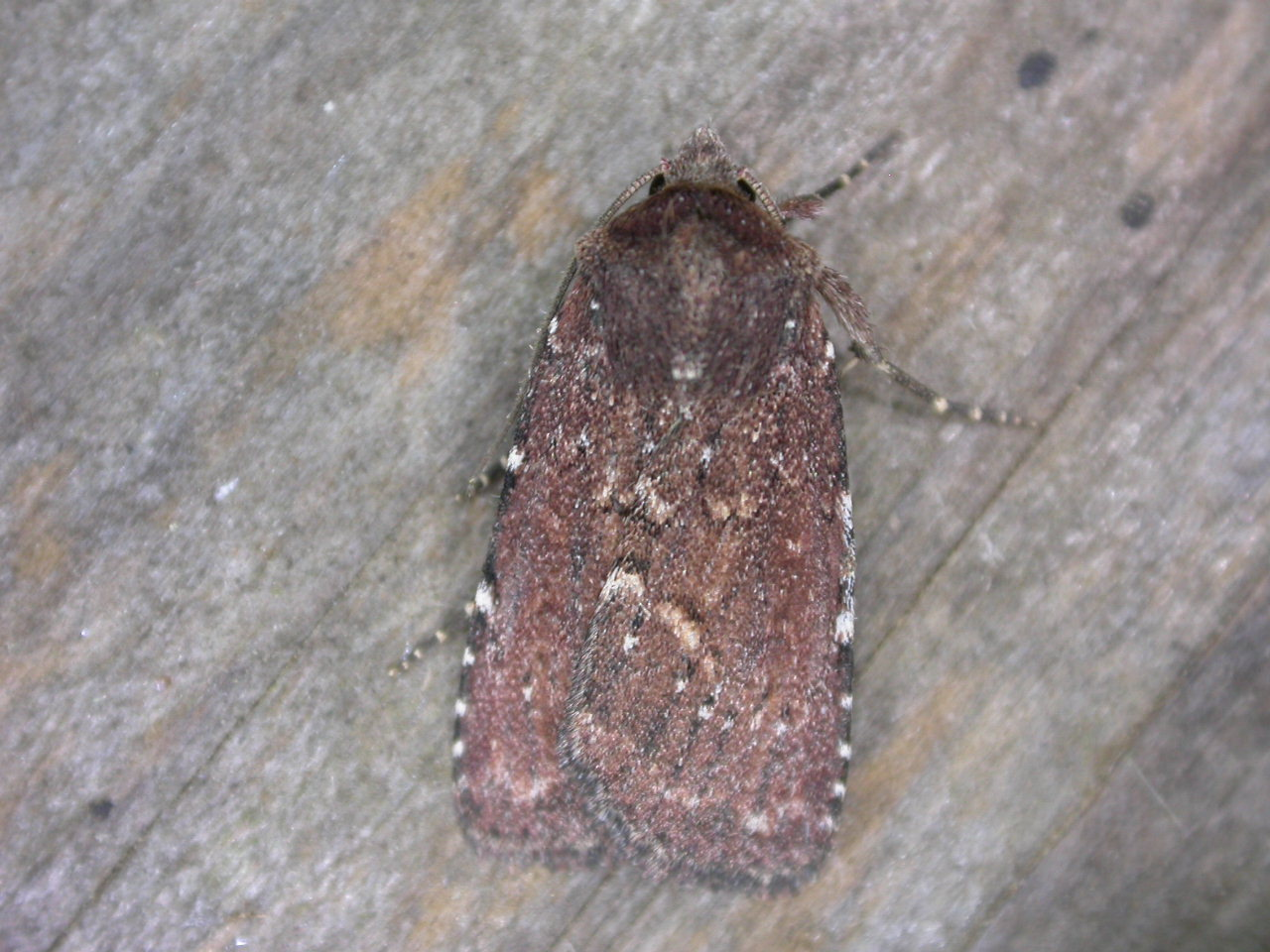

Scientific classification
- Domain: Eukaryota
- Kingdom: Animalia
- Phylum: Arthropoda
- Class: Insecta
- Order: Lepidoptera
- Superfamily: Noctuoidea
- Family: Noctuidae
- Genus: Lycophotia
- Species: L. erythrina

Binomial name
- Lycophotia erythrina (Herrich-Schäffer, 1852)

Synonyms
- Agrotis erythrina

= Lycophotia erythrina =

Species of moth

Lycophotia erythrina is a moth of the family Noctuidae. It is found around the Mediterranean Sea and Atlantic Ocean coast of Europe in Spain, Portugal, Southern France, Northern Italy and Albania.

It has a wingspan of 26–33 mm. Adults are on wing from May to July depending on the location.

The larvae feed on Erica species.
