= Frontal horn cyst =

A frontal horn cyst or connatal cyst is a cystic area in the brain. It is sometimes found in newborn babies with an incidence rate of 0.4-6%. It is adjacent to the superolateral margin of the body and frontal horn of the lateral ventricles, and is believed to represent a normal variant with no effect on neurological development. On ultrasound imaging, the outward most part of the ventricles has rounded appearance, giving the cystic appearance.
