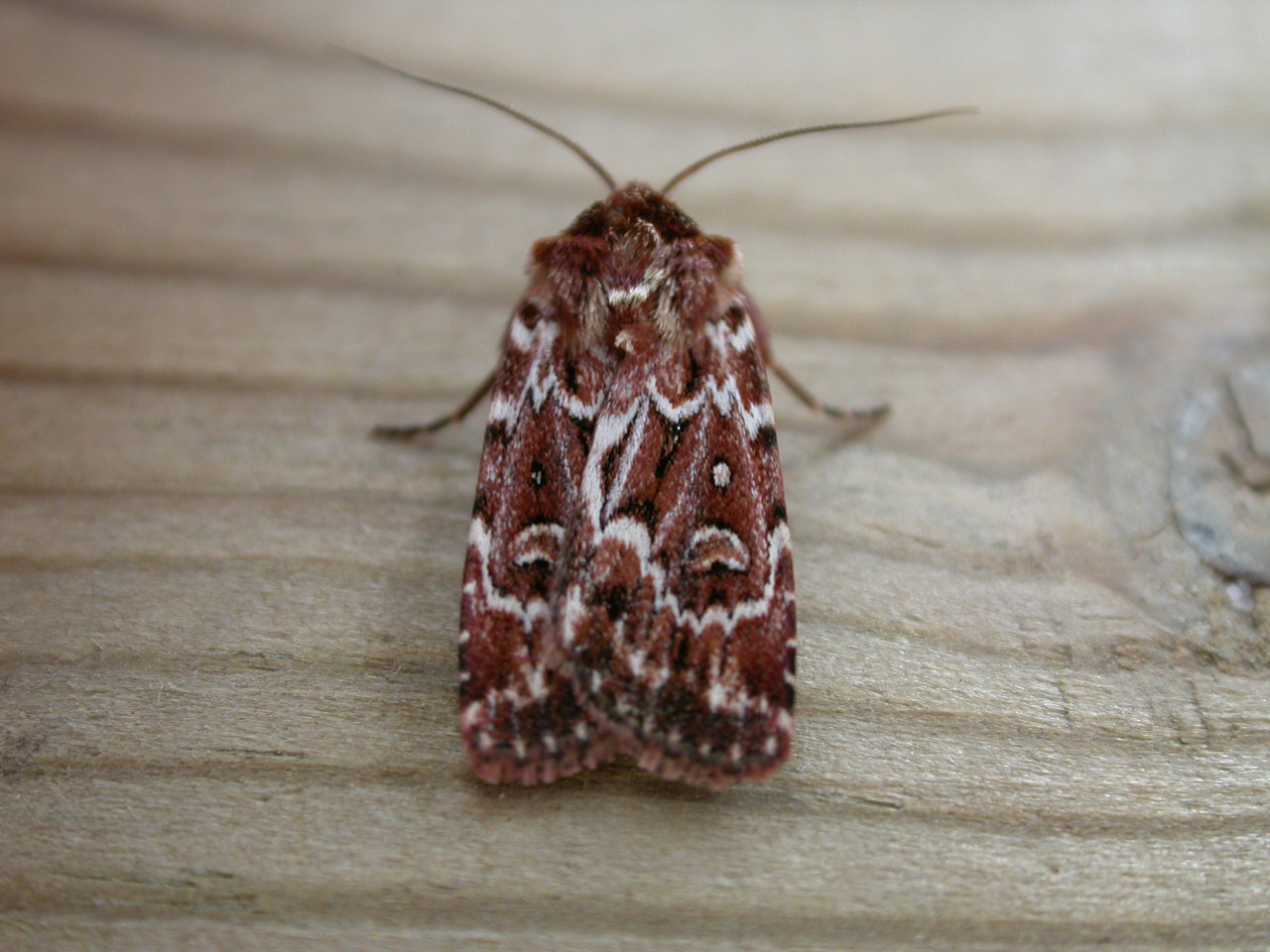
- Lycophotia porphyrea

Scientific classification
- Kingdom: Animalia
- Phylum: Arthropoda
- Clade: Pancrustacea
- Class: Insecta
- Order: Lepidoptera
- Superfamily: Noctuoidea
- Family: Noctuidae
- Tribe: Noctuini
- Genus: Lycophotia; Hübner, 1821

Synonyms
- Heptagrotis McDunnough, 1920; Scotophila Stephens, 1829; Violaphotia Beck, 1992; Paucgraphia Beck, 1992

= Lycophotia =

Genus of moths

Lycophotia is a genus of moths of the family Noctuidae.

== Species ==
There are at least five recognized species:

- Lycophotia cissigma (Ménétriés, 1859)
- Lycophotia erythrina (Herrich-Schäffer, [1852])
- Lycophotia molothina (Esper, 1789)
- Lycophotia phyllophora (Grote, 1874)
- Lycophotia porphyrea ([Schiffermüller], 1775) - True lover's knot

The Global Lepidoptera Index lists one additional species:

- Lycophotia velata (Staudinger, 1888)

Markku Savela's list includes three additional species:

- Lycophotia ecvinacea Hampson, 1903
- Lycophotia melanephra Hampson, 1909
- Lycophotia postventa (Geyer, 1837)
