= Central lobule =

Part of the cerebellum

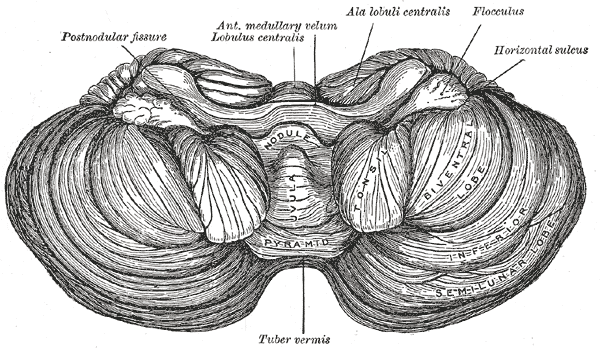
- Anterior view of the cerebellum.

Details

Identifiers
- Latin: lobulus centralis
- NeuroNames: 658
- NeuroLex ID: birnlex_920
- TA98: A14.1.07.105
- TA2: 5821
- FMA: 72519

The central lobule is a small square lobule, situated in the anterior cerebellar notch. It overlaps the lingula, from which it is separated by the precentral fissure; laterally, it extends along the upper and anterior part of each hemisphere, where it forms a wing-like prolongation (ala), on each side, as the alae of the central lobule or alae lobuli centralis.

== Additional images ==
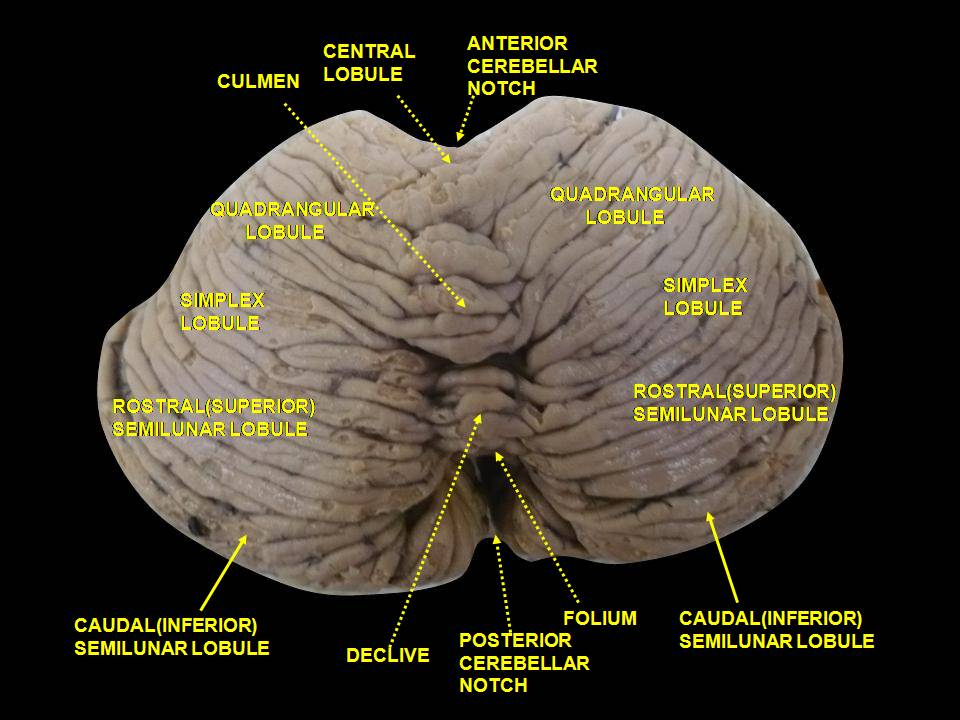
Cerebellum. Superior surface.

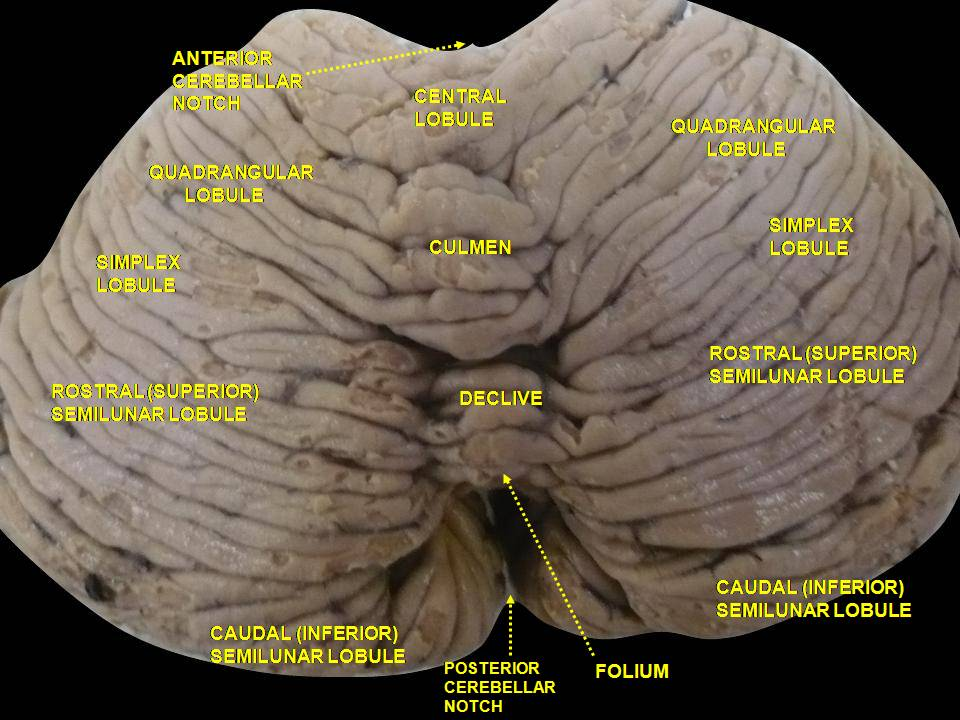
Cerebellum. Superior surface.

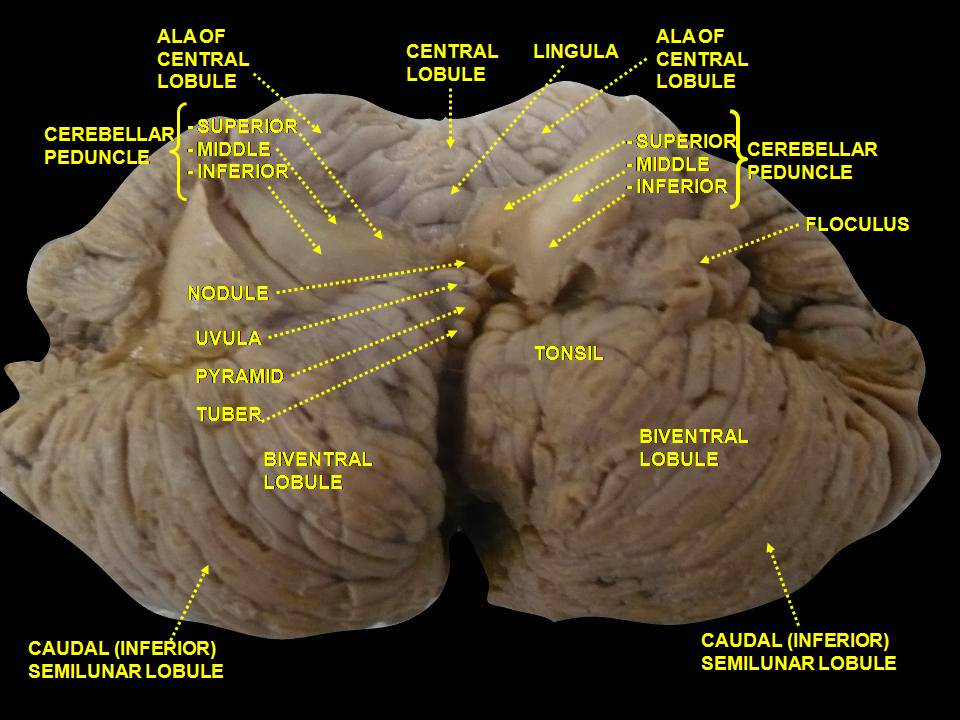
Cerebellum. Inferior surface.

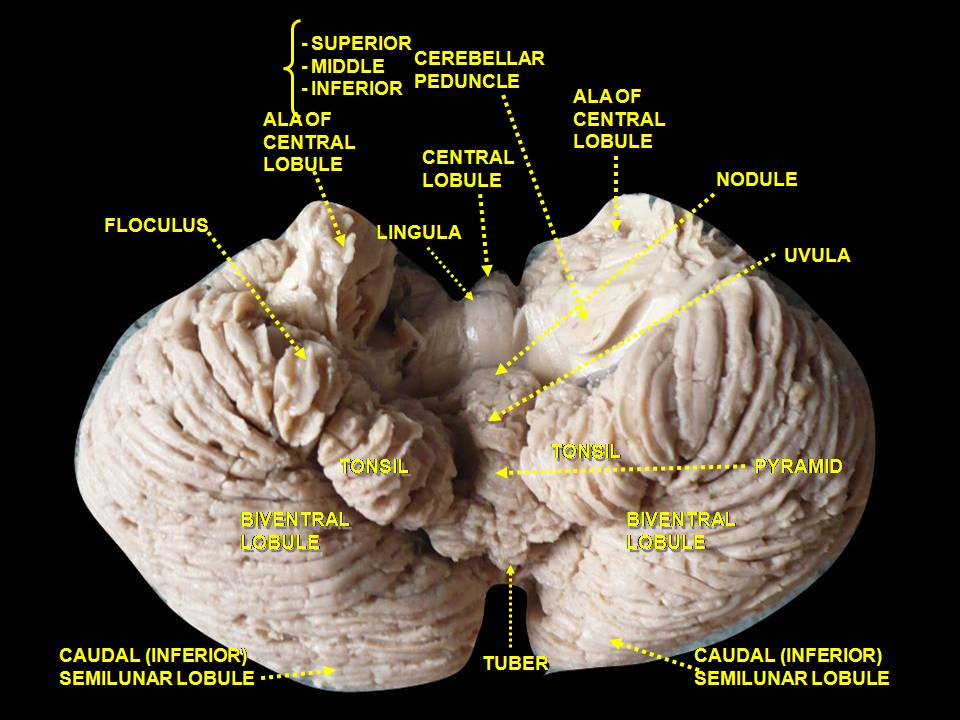
Cerebellum. Inferior surface.

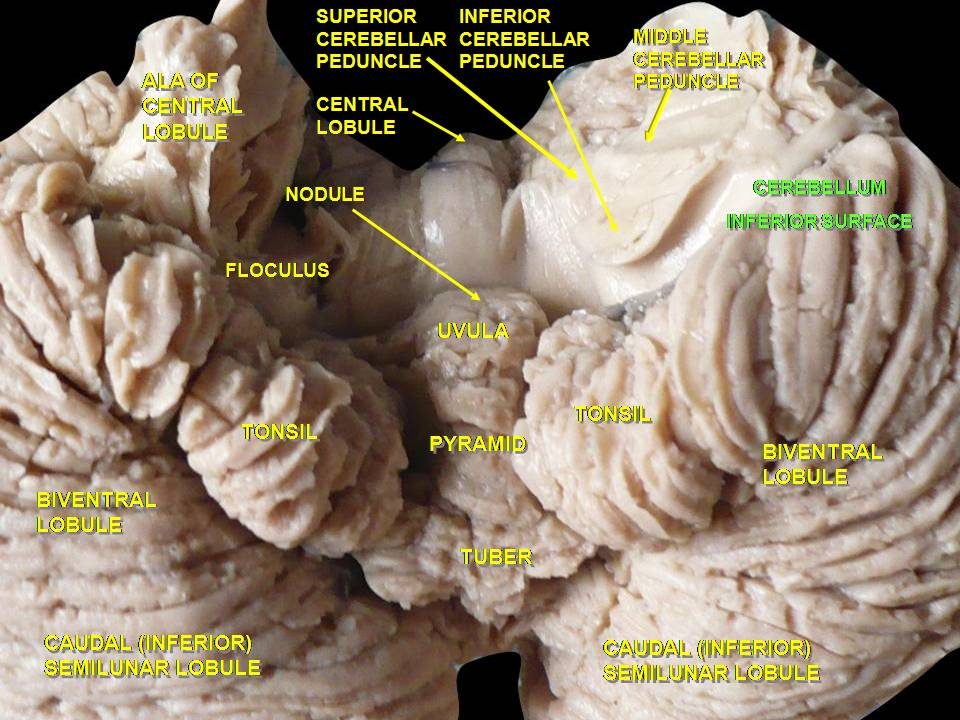
Cerebellum. Inferior surface.
