= Lycophotia phyllophora =

Scientific classification
- Kingdom: Animalia
- Phylum: Arthropoda
- Class: Insecta
- Order: Lepidoptera
- Superfamily: Noctuoidea
- Family: Noctuidae
- Genus: Lycophotia
- Species: L. phyllophora

Binomial name
- Lycophotia phyllophora (Grote, 1874)

Synonyms
- Agrotis phyllophora Grote, 1874; Heptagrotis phyllophora (Grote, 1874)

Species of moth

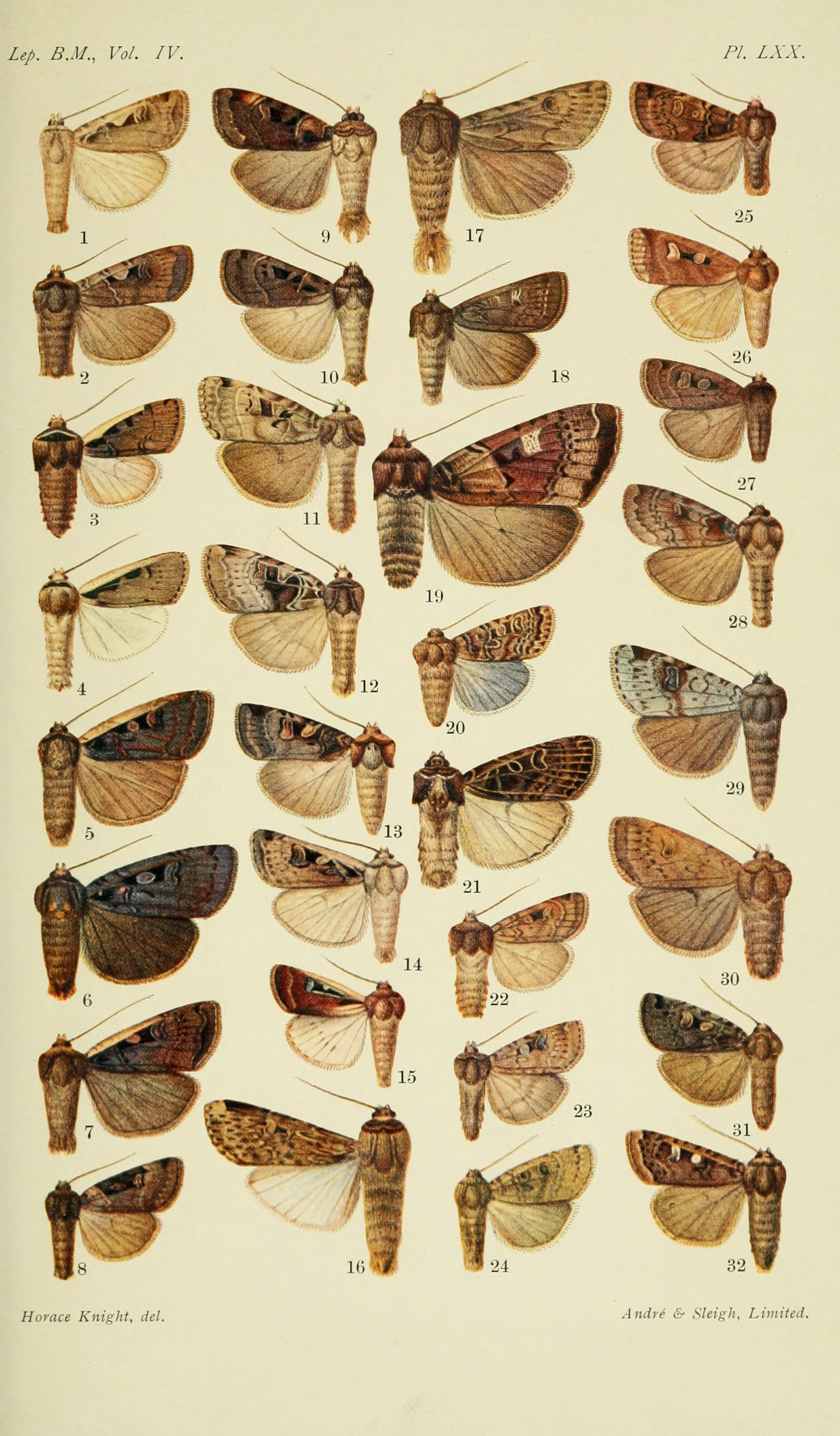

Lycophotia phyllophora, the lycophotia moth, is a moth of the family Noctuidae. It is found across southern and central Canada from New Brunswick and Nova Scotia to western Ontario, and in the northern United States from Maine to Minnesota, south to Ohio, and along the Appalachians to western North Carolina.

The wingspan is about 35 mm. Adults are on wing from June to August.

The larvae feed on the leaves of Alnus, Viburnum, Betula, Vaccinium, Prunus, Spiraea and Salix.
