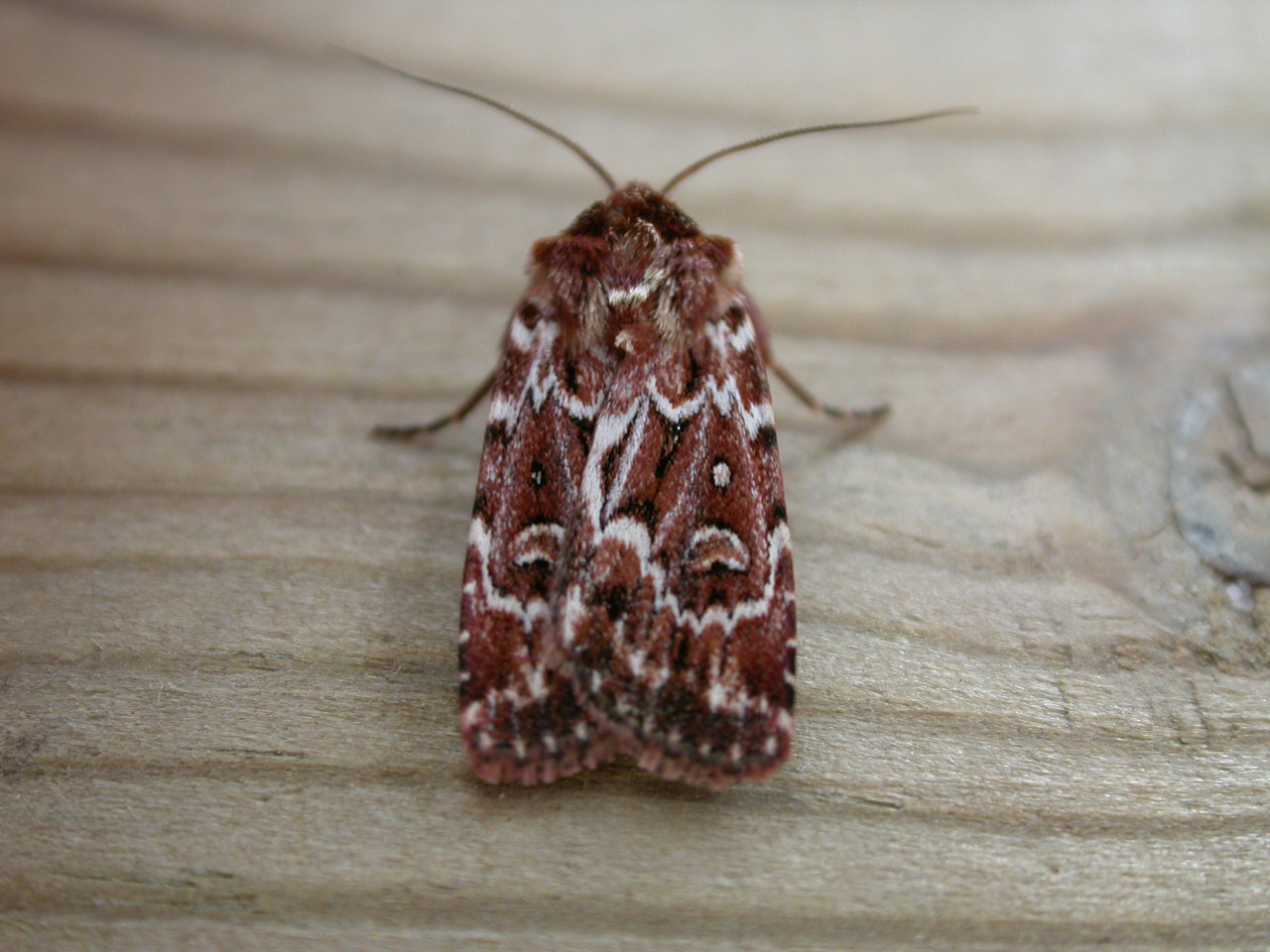

Scientific classification
- Kingdom: Animalia
- Phylum: Arthropoda
- Clade: Pancrustacea
- Class: Insecta
- Order: Lepidoptera
- Superfamily: Noctuoidea
- Family: Noctuidae
- Genus: Lycophotia
- Species: L. porphyrea

Binomial name
- Lycophotia porphyrea (Denis & Schiffermüller, 1775)

Synonyms
- Noctua porphyrea [Schiffermüller], 1775; Peridroma porphyrea (Denis and Schiffermüller, 1775); Noctua strigula Thunberg, 1792; Phalaena (Noctua) varia Villers, 1789; Phalaena (Noctua) concinna Esper, 1790; Phalaena (Noctua) concinna Esper, 1804; Noctua picta Fabricius, 1794; Phalaena ericae Donovan, 1801; Noctua ericae Haworth, 1809 (preocc. Phalaena ericae Donovan, 1801); Chersotis marmorea Graslin, 1863; Agrotis strigula var. astur Culot, 1909

= True lover's knot (moth) =

Species of moth

The true lover's knot (Lycophotia porphyrea) is a moth of the family Noctuidae. The species was first described by Michael Denis and Ignaz Schiffermüller in 1775. It is found in the west Palearctic in a wide band through northern, central and eastern Europe and Russia (up to the Ural Mountains). In the south it is spread through northern Spain and northern Portugal, northern Italy, Macedonia, Bulgaria, and northern Greece. In Europe it is found wherever its food plants grow. It is traditionally thought of as a species typical of heathland and moorland but it can often be found in places where heather and its relatives are in garden cultivation, or sunny slopes and forest edges. In the mountains it is found up to an elevation of over 2000 metres above sea level.

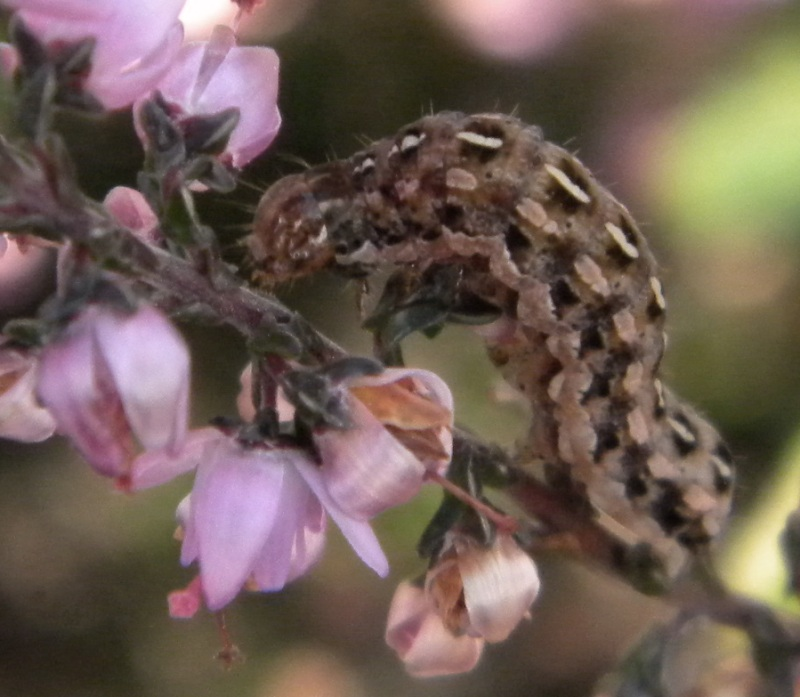
Larva

This is a small but attractive species, with a wingspan of 26–34 mm (individuals hatched in higher altitudes tend to be smaller than those from the lowlands). The forewings are brown, often tinged with purple and marked with a complex pattern of white markings which are supposed to recall a true lover's knot. The hindwings are grey or buff. It flies from the latter half of June to the beginning of August and is attracted to light and the flowers of its food plants.

== Technical description and variation ==
The species has a wingspan of 26–34 mm. Its forewings are brick red; the veins white; lines dark, irregularly edged with white; stigmata edged with white and black scales; the claviform elongate, slender; the orbicular small and round; hindwing ochreous fuscous. The form marmorea Grasl. from France, has a pale blurred appearance: – concinna Esp is deep purple in colour; – while suffusa Tutt from Shetland is larger than the type and brown-red. See also Fibiger, 1993

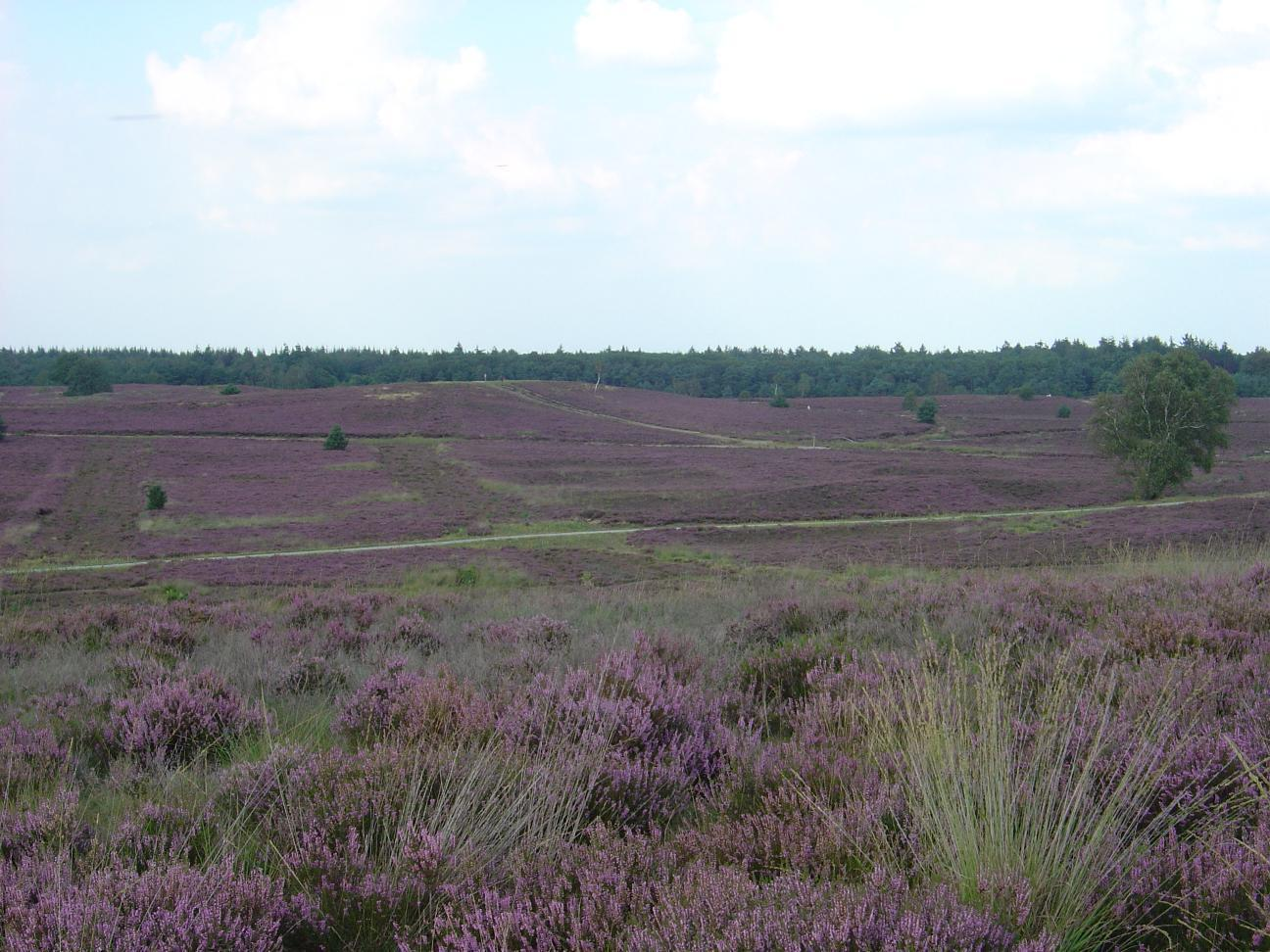
Heathland habitat in the Netherlands

== Biology ==
The larva is reddish brown or pinkish ochreous; the lines pale or white, broken up and edged with fuscous marks; spiracular line pinkish white, edged above with dark and feeds on heather and related genera (e.g. Erica). The species overwinters as a larva.
