= Frenulum veli =

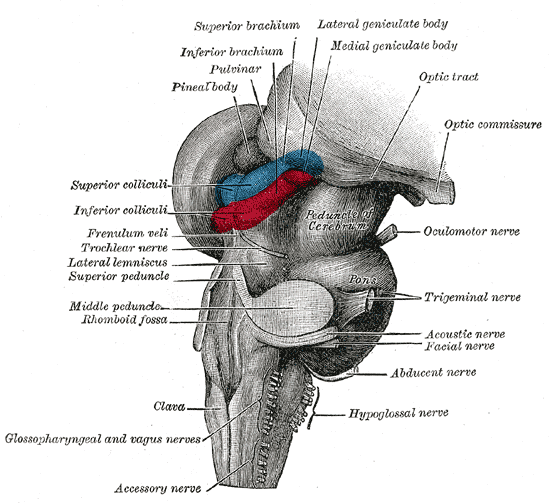
- Hind- and mid-brains; postero-lateral view. (Frenulum veli labeled at center left.)

Details
- Part of: Superior medullary velum

Identifiers
- Latin: frenulum veli medullaris superioris
- NeuroNames: 2300
- TA98: A14.1.05.005
- TA2: 5977
- FMA: 84380

The frenulum veli, or frenulum of superior medullary velum, also known as the frenulum veli medullaris superioris, cerebellar frenulum, or frenulum cerebelli, is a slightly raised white band passing from the inferior end of the medial longitudinal fissure, through the groove between the quadrigeminal bodies, and down to the superior medullary velum.

On either side of this band the trochlear nerve emerges, and passes forward on the lateral aspect of the cerebral peduncle to reach the base of the brain.
