= Inferior medullary velum =

Part of the cerebellum

- Scheme of roof of fourth ventricle. The arrow is in the foramen of Majendie. 1: inferior medullary velum 2: Choroid plexus 3: Cerebellomedullary cistern of subarachnoid cavity 4: Central canal 5: Corpora quadrigemina 6: Cerebral peduncle 7: superior medullary velum 8: Ependymal lining of ventricle 9: Pontine cistern of subarachnoid cavity

Details

Identifiers
- Latin: velum medullare inferius
- NeuroNames: 697

The inferior medullary velum (posterior medullary velum) is a thin layer of white substance, prolonged from the white center of the cerebellum, above and on either side of the nodule; it forms the infero-posterior part of the fourth ventricle.

Somewhat semilunar in shape, its convex edge is continuous with the white substance of the cerebellum, while its thin concave margin is apparently free; in reality, however, it is continuous with the epithelium of the ventricle, which is prolonged downward from the posterior medullary velum to the taeniae.

== See also ==
- Superior medullary velum
