= Collateral eminence =

Brain structure

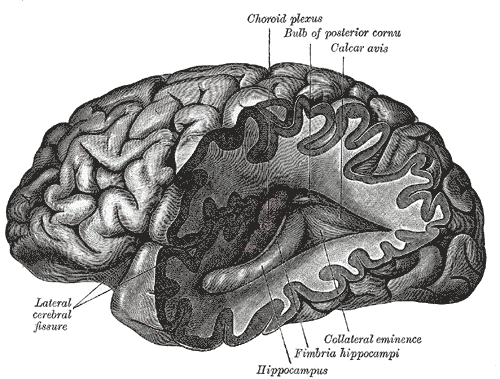
- Posterior and inferior cornua of left lateral ventricle exposed from the side.

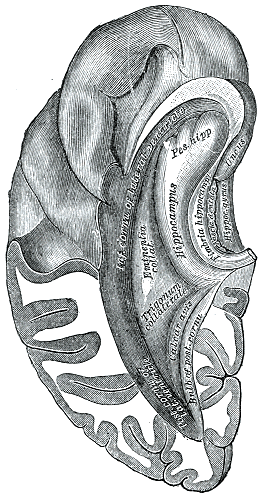
- Inferior and posterior cornua, viewed from above.

Details

Identifiers
- Latin: eminentia collateralis ventriculi lateralis
- NeuroNames: 211
- TA98: A14.1.09.282
- TA2: 5658
- FMA: 83706

The collateral eminence is an elongated swelling lying lateral parallel with the hippocampus. It corresponds with the medial part of the collateral fissure, and its size depends on the depth and direction of this fissure. It is continuous behind with a flattened triangular area, the trigone of the lateral ventricle, situated between the posterior and inferior horn. It is not always present.
