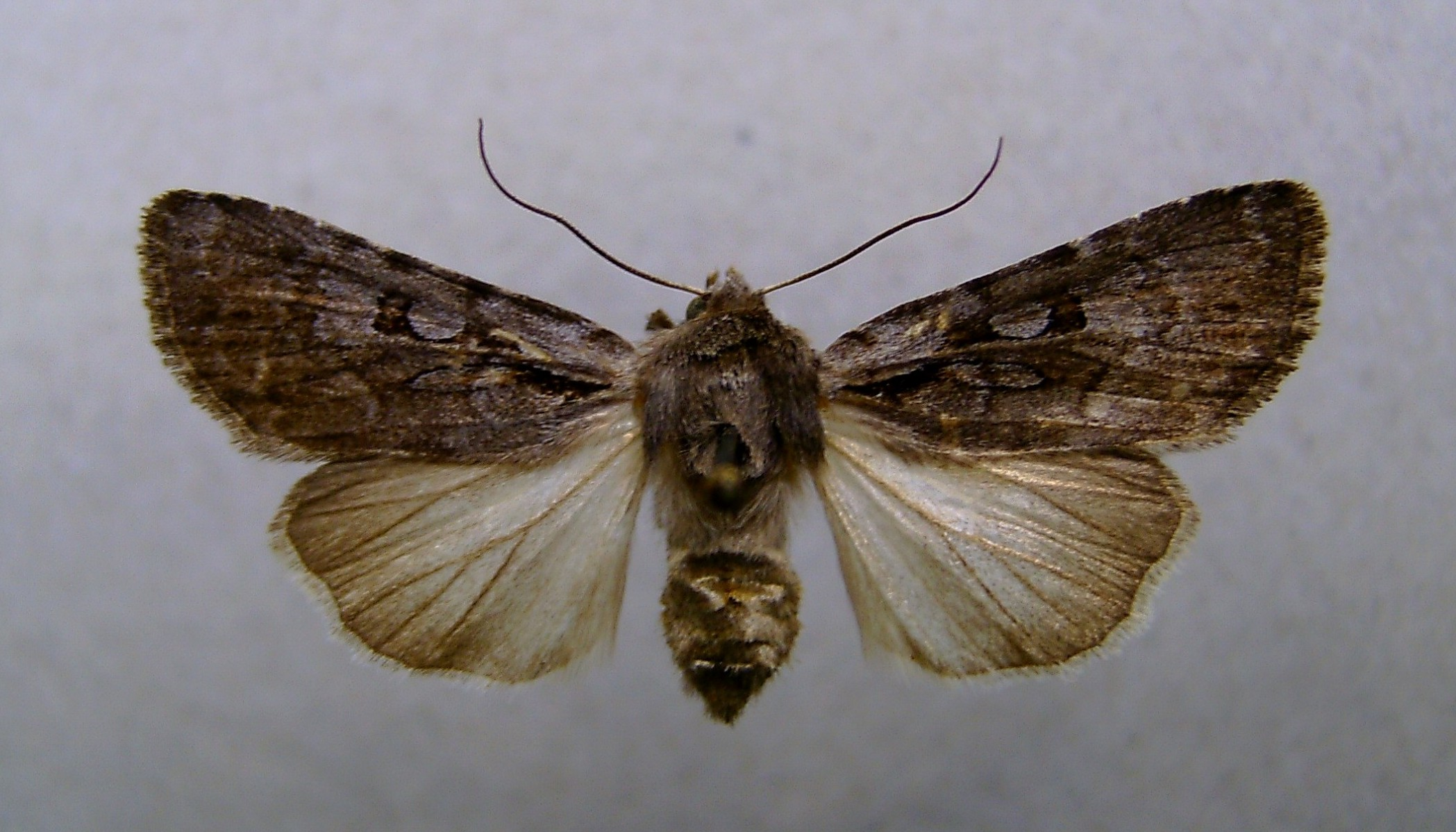

Scientific classification
- Domain: Eukaryota
- Kingdom: Animalia
- Phylum: Arthropoda
- Class: Insecta
- Order: Lepidoptera
- Superfamily: Noctuoidea
- Family: Noctuidae
- Genus: Lycophotia
- Species: L. molothina

Binomial name
- Lycophotia molothina (Esper, 1789)

Synonyms
- Phalaena molothina Esper, 1789; Chersotis ericae Boisduval, 1840; Agrotis velum Germar, [1842]; Agrotis molothina var. occidentalis Bellier, 1860; Rhyacia molothina var. andalusica Schawerda, 1934

= Lycophotia molothina =

Species of moth

Lycophotia molothina is a species of moth in the family Noctuidae. It is distributed throughout south-western and central Europe and is found wherever its food plants grow. It is traditionally thought of as a species of heathland.

This species shows a wingspan of 38–40 mm. The forewings are brown or grey, often tinged with red or blue and marked with a whitish streak at the front part. Orbicular and reniform stigma are grey and well defined. The hindwings are light grey. Lycophotia molothina flies from May to the end of July and is attracted to light and sugar.

The young larva is light green with five pale lines. Adult larvae change their colour into dark green, reddish or brown. They feed on Calluna vulgaris. The species overwinters as a larva.

== Subspecies ==
- Lycophotia molothina molothina
- Lycophotia molothina occidentalis (Bellier, 1860)

== Reading ==
Michael Fibiger: Noctuidae Europaeae. Vol. 2, Entomological Press, Sorø 1993, ISBN 87-89430-02-6.
