= Cavum Vergae =

Anatomical variance of the brain

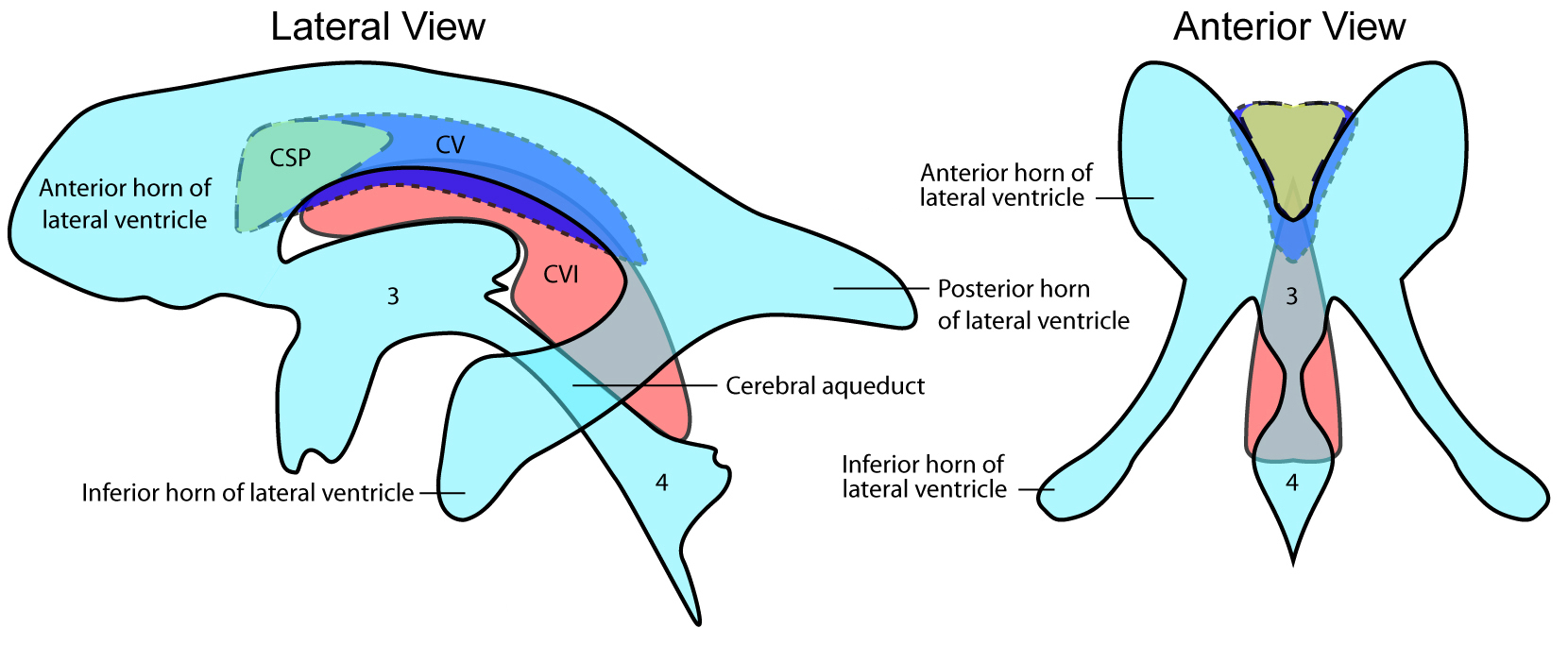
- Difference between cavum septi pellucidi (CSP), cavum Vergae (CV) and cavum veli interpositi (CVI). 3=third ventricle, 4=fourth ventricle.

Cavum vergae is a normal anatomical variant in the human brain, which is seen in imaging as the posterior extension of the cave of septum pellucidum. It is sometimes described as the cavum septi pellucidi et vergae (or cavum septum pellucidum et vergae). It represents the persisntent embryonic fluid-filled space between the leaflets of the septum pellucidum.

Although the septal leaflets are ependyma-lined on their ventricular surfaces, the cavum itself is an extra-pial cavity that does not communicate with the ventricular system or the subarachnoid space.

Historically, cavum vergae has been referred to as the "sixth ventricle", but modern anatomical descriptions avoid ventricular numbering because it lacks key features of a true brain ventricle (for example, a continuous ependymal lining).

== Anatomy ==
The cavum vergae is defined anatomically by the columns of the fornix anteriorly, splenium of the corpus callosum posteriorly, body of the corpus callosum superiorly and the transverse part of the fornix inferiorly.

== Development ==
During fetal development, the two leaflets of the septum pellucidum are separated by CSF, forming a cavum that includes both an anterior portion (cavum septi pellucidi) and a posterior portion (cavum vergae). Leaflet fusion typically begins at around the sixth month of gestation and proceeds from posterior to anterior, so that the cavum vergae closes before the cavum septi pellucidi. In term neonates the cavum vergae is normally closed, and the cavum septi pellucidi typically closes during early infancy (commonly by 3–6 months).

In term neonates the cavum vergae is normally closed, and the cavum septi pellucidi typically closes during early infancy (commonly by 3–6 months).

== Prevalence ==
A cranial ultrasound study reported cavum vergae in 60% of premature infants and 7% of full-term neonates; no cavum vergae was detected in a cohort of healthy 1-month-old infants.

In a CT series of 1,050 infants and children with neurological indications, the incidence of combined cavum septi pellucidi/cavum vergae cavities decreased from 10% under 1 year of age to around 2–3% in later childhood.

A large retrospective review of CT reports in Taiwan found cavum septi pellucidi and/or cavum vergae in 0.93% of scans.

== Clinical significance ==
When not enlarged, a persistent cavum vergae is generally treated as an incidental, normal anatomical variant on neuroimaging.

== History and terminology ==
The term cavum vergae commemorates the Italian anatomist Andrea Verga (1811–1895), who described a posterior extension of the cavity beneath the corpus callosum in 1851.

Older or less common names include cavum psalterii and cavum fornicis. In anatomical Latin, "vergae" is a genitive form referring to Verga.
