= Choroid plexus =

Structure in the ventricles of the brain

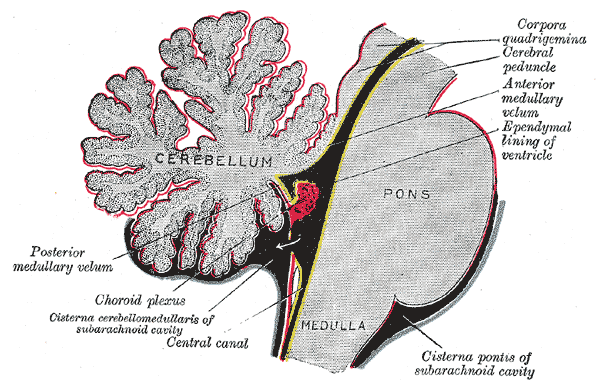
- Choroid plexus shown in the fourth ventricle

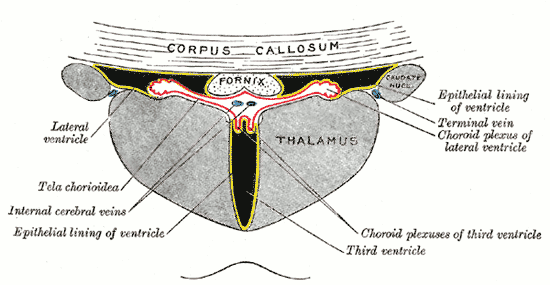
- Coronal section of lateral and third ventricles.

Details

Identifiers
- Latin: plexus choroideus
- MeSH: D002831
- NeuroNames: 1377
- TA98: A14.1.09.279; A14.1.01.307; A14.1.01.306; A14.1.01.304; A14.1.05.715
- TA2: 5654, 5786, 5980
- FMA: 61934

The choroid plexus, or plica choroidea, is a plexus of cells and blood vessels that arises from the tela choroidea in each of the ventricles of the brain. It consists of modified ependymal cells surrounding a core of capillaries and loose connective tissue. Cells of the choroid plexus secrete most of the cerebrospinal fluid (CSF) of the central nervous system. Because the CSF is important for regulating the chemical and physical environment of the brain and spinal cord, the choroid plexus plays an essential role in the development and homeostasis of the central nervous system.

== Structure ==
=== Location ===
Scheme of roof of fourth ventricle. The arrow is in the median aperture. 1: Inferior medullary velum 2: Choroid plexus 3: Cisterna magna of subarachnoid space 4: Central canal 5: Corpora quadrigemina 6: Cerebral peduncle 7: Superior medullary velum 8: Ependymal lining of ventricle 9: Pontine cistern of subarachnoid space

There is a choroid plexus in each of the four ventricles. In the lateral ventricles, it is a continuous structure that occurs in the body of the ventricles, the atrium (or 'trigone'), and the inferior horn. It does not extend into the anterior horn or the posterior horn. The choroid plexus in the roof of the third ventricle is continuous with the plexus in the body of the lateral ventricles via the interventricular foramina, the channels that connect the lateral ventricles with the third ventricle. A choroid plexus also is located in the posterior roof of the fourth ventricle.

=== Microanatomy ===
The choroid plexus consists of a layer of cuboidal epithelial cells surrounding a core of capillaries and loose connective tissue. The epithelium of the choroid plexus is continuous with the ependymal cell layer (ventricular layer) that lines the ventricles. Progenitor ependymal cells are monociliated but they differentiate into multiciliated ependymal cells. Unlike the ventricular ependyma, the choroid plexus epithelial layer has tight junctions between the cells on the side facing the ventricle (the apical surface). Because the capillaries in the stroma are fenestrated, these tight junctions serve to prevent most of the substances that pass from the capillaries into the stroma from crossing the cell layer into the cerebrospinal fluid (CSF); thus the choroid plexus acts as a blood–CSF barrier.

The choroid plexus folds into small, finger-shaped protrusions called 'villi' around each capillary, creating frond-like processes that project into the ventricles. The villi, along with a brush border of microvilli, greatly increase the surface area of the choroid plexus. CSF is formed as plasma is filtered from the blood through the epithelial cells. Choroid plexus epithelial cells actively transport sodium ions into the ventricles and water follows the resulting osmotic gradient. The movement of cilia on the ependymal cells helps to circulate the cerebrospinal fluid.

Micrograph of the choroid plexus in the lateral ventricle of a human. Hematoxylin and eosin stain; scale bar = 50 microns (0.05 mm).

== Function ==
The choroid plexus regulates the production and composition of cerebrospinal fluid, which provides protective buoyancy for the brain and spinal cord. The cerebrospinal fluid also acts as a medium for the glymphatic filtration system that facilitates the removal of metabolic waste from the nervous system, and the exchange of biomolecules and xenobiotics into and out of the brain. In this way the choroid plexus has an important role in helping to maintain the chemical and physical conditions that enable optimal functioning of the central nervous system.

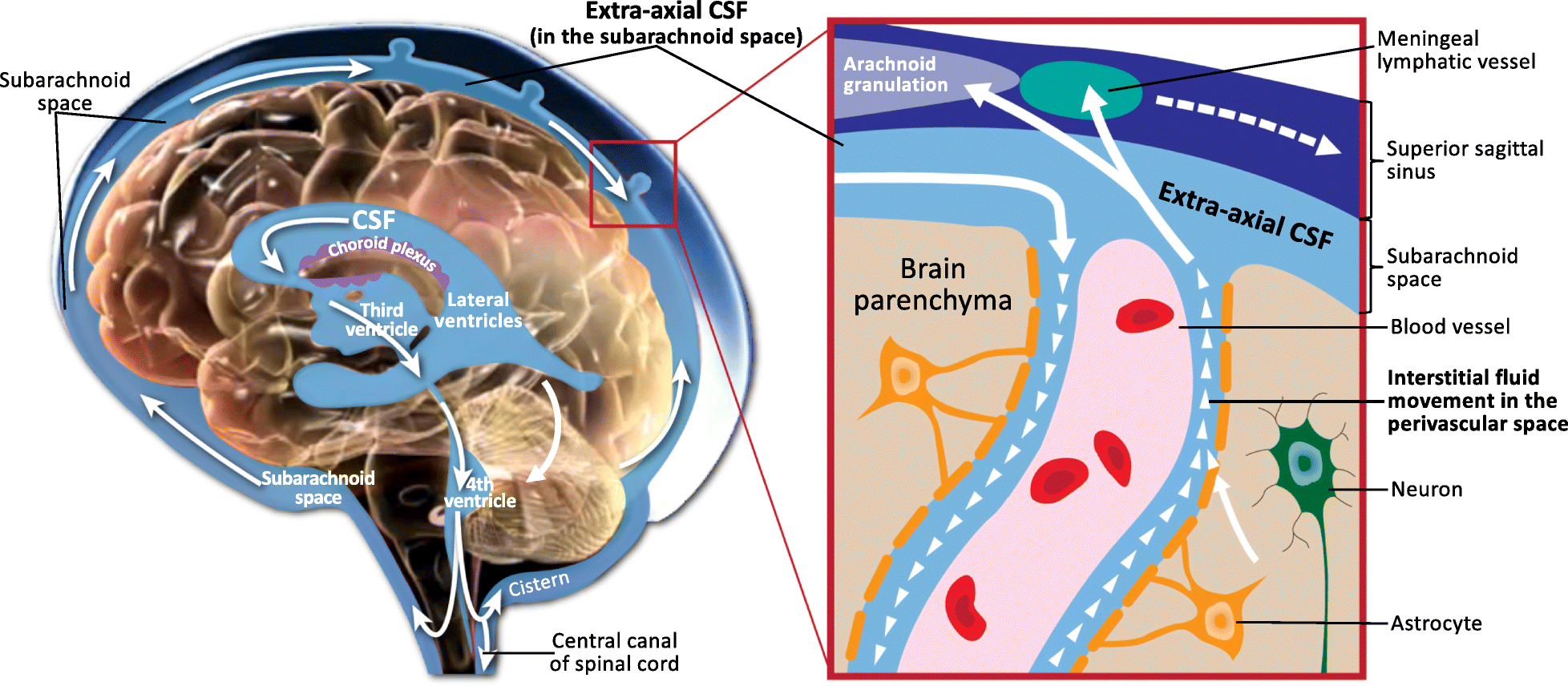
CSF circulation

The choroid plexus is also a major source of transferrin secretion that plays a part in iron homeostasis in the brain.

=== Blood–cerebrospinal fluid barrier ===
The blood–cerebrospinal fluid barrier (BCSFB) is a fluid–brain barrier that is composed of a pair of membranes that separate blood from CSF at the capillary level and CSF from brain tissue. The blood–CSF boundary at the choroid plexus is a membrane composed of epithelial cells and tight junctions that link them. There is a CSF-brain barrier at the level of the pia mater, but only in the embryo.

Similar to the blood–brain barrier, the blood–CSF barrier functions to prevent the passage of most blood-borne substances into the brain, while selectively permitting the passage of specific substances (such as nutrients) into the brain and facilitating the removal of brain metabolites and metabolic products into the blood. Despite the similar function between the BBB and BCSFB, each facilitates the transport of different substances into the brain due to the distinctive structural characteristics of each of the two barrier systems. For a number of substances, the BCSFB is the primary site of entry into brain tissue.

The blood–cerebrospinal fluid barrier has also been shown to modulate the entry of leukocytes from the blood into the central nervous system. The choroid plexus cells secrete cytokines that recruit monocyte-derived macrophages, among other cells, to the brain. This cellular trafficking has implications both in normal brain homeostasis and in neuroinflammatory processes.

== Clinical significance ==
=== Choroid plexus cysts ===
During fetal development, some choroid plexus cysts may form. These fluid-filled cysts can be detected by a detailed second trimester ultrasound. The finding is relatively common, with a prevalence of ~1%. Choroid plexus cysts are usually an isolated finding. The cysts typically disappear later during pregnancy, and are usually harmless. They have no effect on infant and early childhood development.

Choroid plexus cysts are associated with a 1% risk of fetal aneuploidy. The risk of aneuploidy increases to 10.5-12% if other risk factors or ultrasound findings are noted. Size, location, disappearance or progression, and whether the cysts are found on both sides or not do not affect the risk of aneuploidy. 44-50% of Edwards syndrome (trisomy 18) cases will present with choroid plexus cysts, as well 1.4% of Down syndrome (trisomy 21) cases. ~75% of abnormal karyotypes associated with choroid plexus cysts are trisomy 18, while the remainder are trisomy 21.

=== Biondi bodies ===
Micrograph of Biondi bodies in the choroid plexus of an older human (one Biondi body is indicated by the arrow). Naoumenko-Feigin silver stain with periodic acid-Schiff counterstain; scale bar = 30 microns (0.03 millimeters).

Biondi bodies (also known as 'Biondi ring tangles') are a distinctive type of amyloid that forms in the cytoplasm of choroidal epithelial cells in aging humans. They are ring- or crescent-shaped bundles of amyloid fibrils consisting of the protein TMEM106B along with lipid droplets and other free cellular elements. Biondi bodies are particularly characteristic of aging humans and (except for an older chimpanzee) they have not been reported in other species.

== Etymology ==
"Choroid plexus" translates from the Latin plexus chorioides, which mirrors Ancient Greek χοριοειδές πλέγμα. The word "choroid" is a combination of the Greek stem word "chorion" (meaning "membrane") and the modifier "-oid" (meaning "-like"), and "plexus" refers to a network of structures such as nerves, lymph vessels or blood vessels. An alternative (but less commonly used) variant of "choroid" is "chorioid".

== Additional images ==
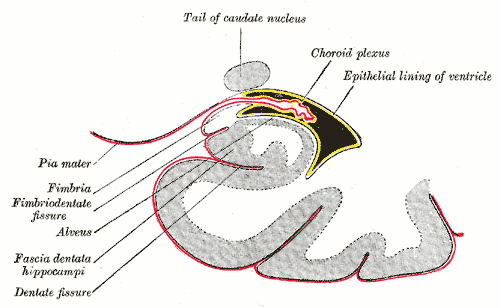
Coronal section of inferior horn of lateral ventricle.

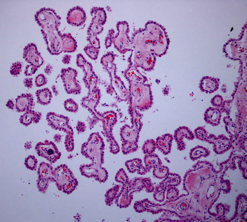
Choroid plexus histology 40x

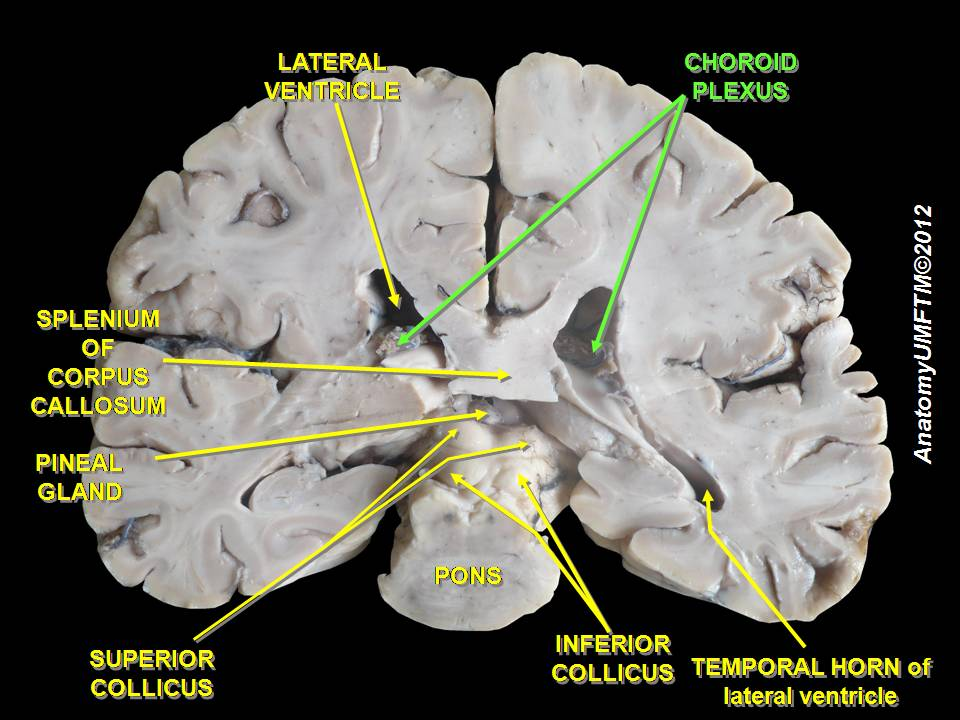
Choroid plexus

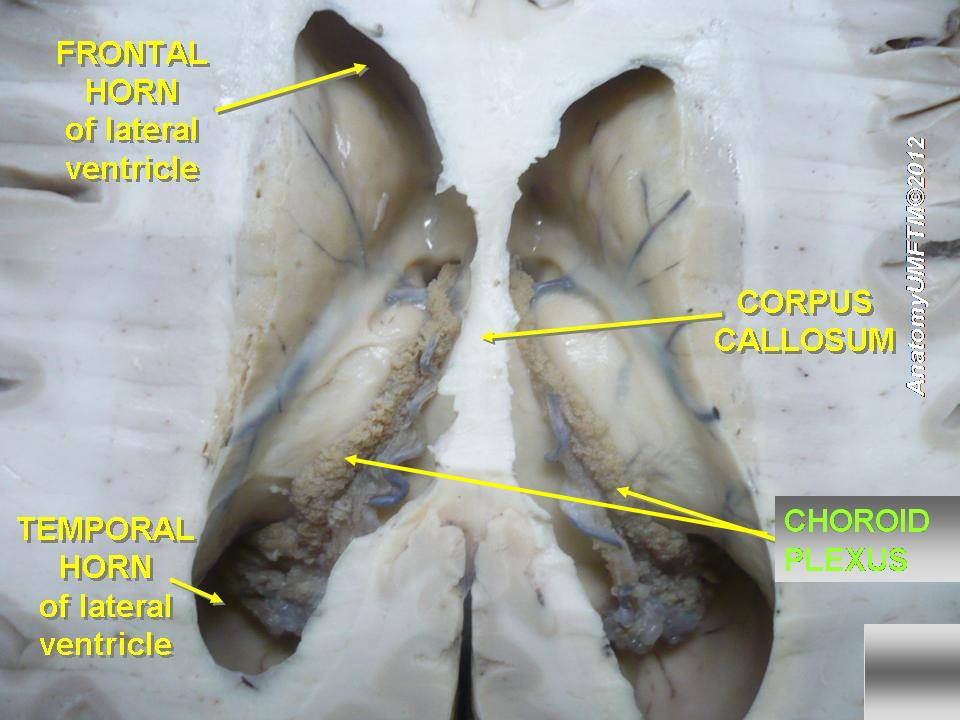
Choroid plexus

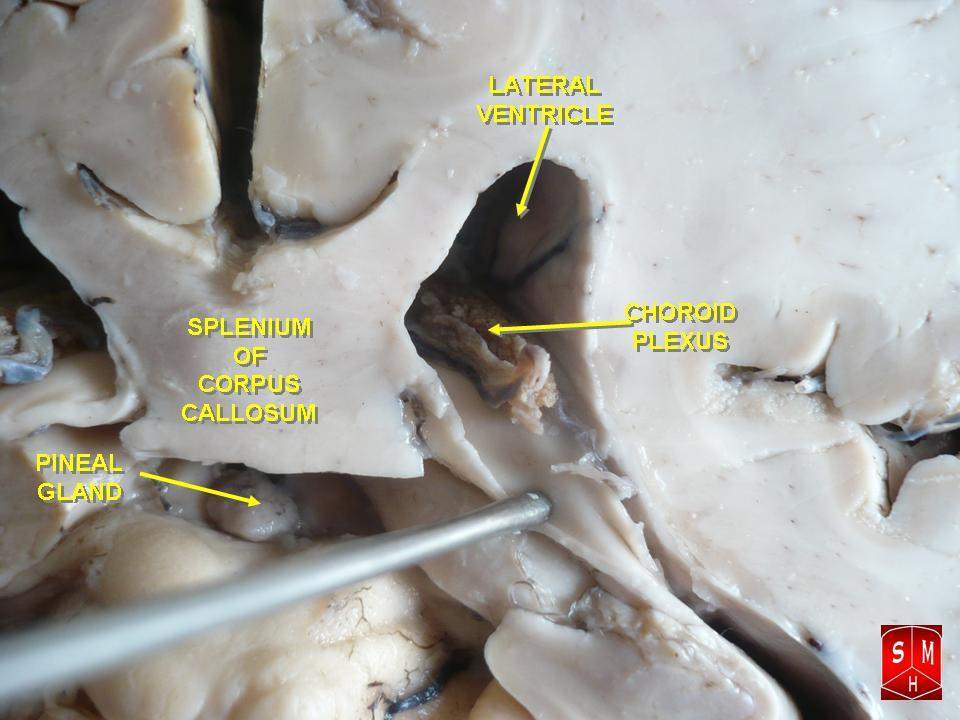
Choroid plexus

== See also ==
- Choroid plexus papilloma
- Tela choroidea

== Sources ==
- Brodbelt A, Stoodley M (October 2007). "CSF pathways: a review". British Journal of Neurosurgery. 21 (5): 510–20. doi:10.1080/02688690701447420. PMID 17922324. S2CID 6901013.
- Strazielle N, Ghersi-Egea JF (July 2000). "Choroid plexus in the central nervous system: biology and physiopathology". Journal of Neuropathology and Experimental Neurology. 59 (7): 561–74. doi:10.1093/jnen/59.7.561. PMID 10901227.
