= Lateral ventricles =

Structures within the human brain

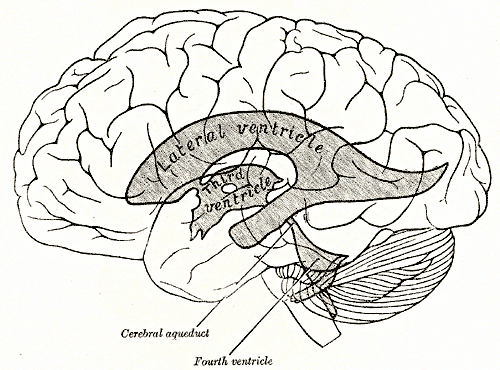
- Scheme showing relations of the ventricles to the surface of the brain; oriented facing left.

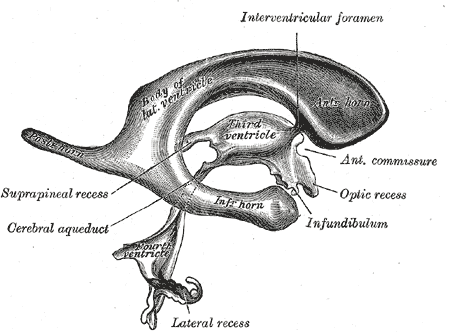
- Drawing of a cast of the ventricular cavities, viewed from the side; oriented facing right.

Details

Identifiers
- Latin: ventriculus lateralis
- MeSH: D020547
- NeuroNames: 209
- NeuroLex ID: birnlex_1263
- TA98: A14.1.09.272
- TA2: 5639
- FMA: 78448

The lateral ventricles are the two largest ventricles of the brain and contain cerebrospinal fluid. Each cerebral hemisphere contains a lateral ventricle, known as the left or right lateral ventricle, respectively.

Each lateral ventricle resembles a C-shaped cavity that begins at an inferior horn in the temporal lobe, travels through a body in the parietal lobe and frontal lobe, and ultimately terminates at the interventricular foramina where each lateral ventricle connects to the single, central third ventricle. Along the path, a posterior horn extends backward into the occipital lobe, and an anterior horn extends farther into the frontal lobe.

== Structure ==
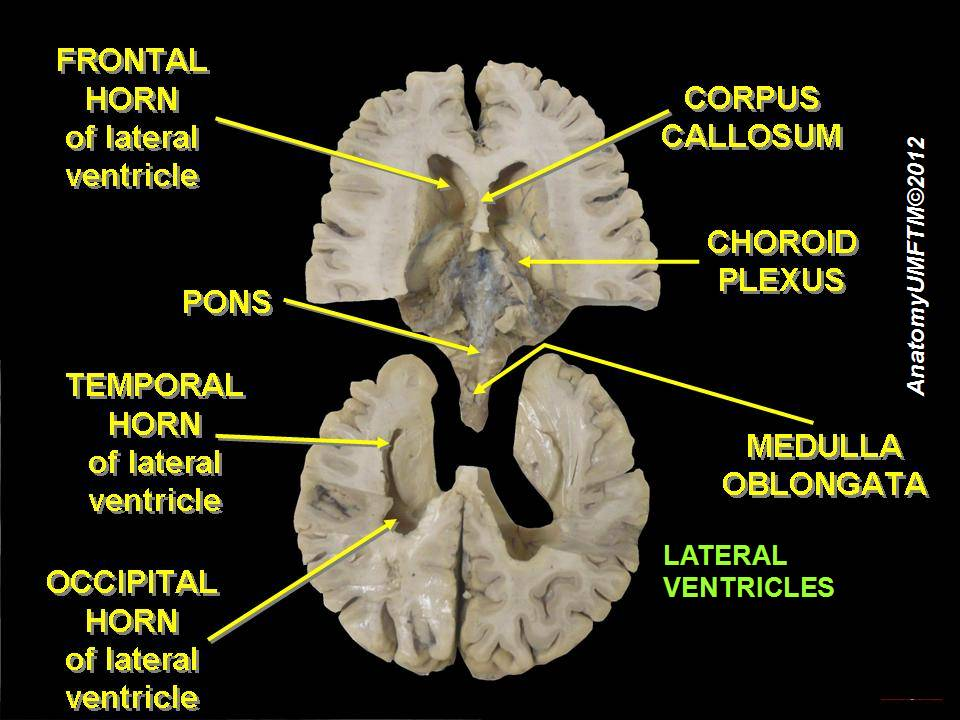
Lateral ventricles and horns

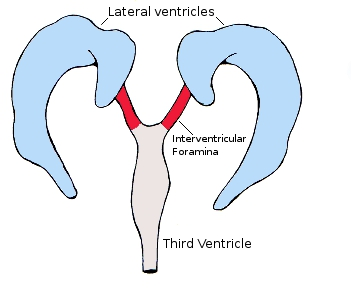
The lateral ventricles connected to the third ventricle by the interventricular foramina

Each lateral ventricle takes the form of an elongated curve, with an additional anterior-facing continuation emerging inferiorly from a point near the posterior end of the curve; the junction is known as the trigone of the lateral ventricle. The centre of the superior curve is referred to as the body, while the three remaining portions are known as horns (cornua in Latin); they are usually referred to by their position relative to the body (anterior, posterior, or inferior), or sometimes by the lobe of the cerebral cortex into which they extend. Though somewhat flat, the lateral ventricles have a vaguely triangular cross-section. Ependyma, which are neuroepithelial cells, line the ventricular system including the lateral ventricles.

Between the inferior horn and the main body of the ventricle is the putamen, which emerges from the head of the caudate nucleus, and sits above the tapetum; a small number of further connections passing through the occipital tapetum to join the putamen to portions of the caudate nucleus tail adjoining the anterior horn. Below the putamen sits the globus pallidus, with which it connects. These structures bounding the lateral ventricles form a frame curving around the thalamus, which itself constitutes the main structure bounding the third ventricle. Were it not for the choroid plexus, a cleft-like opening would be all that lay between the lateral ventricle and the thalamus; this cleft constitutes the lower part of the choroid fissure. The thalamus primarily communicates with the structures bounding the lateral ventricles via the globus pallidus, and the anterior extremities of the fornix (the mamillary bodies).

=== Anterior horns of the lateral ventricle ===
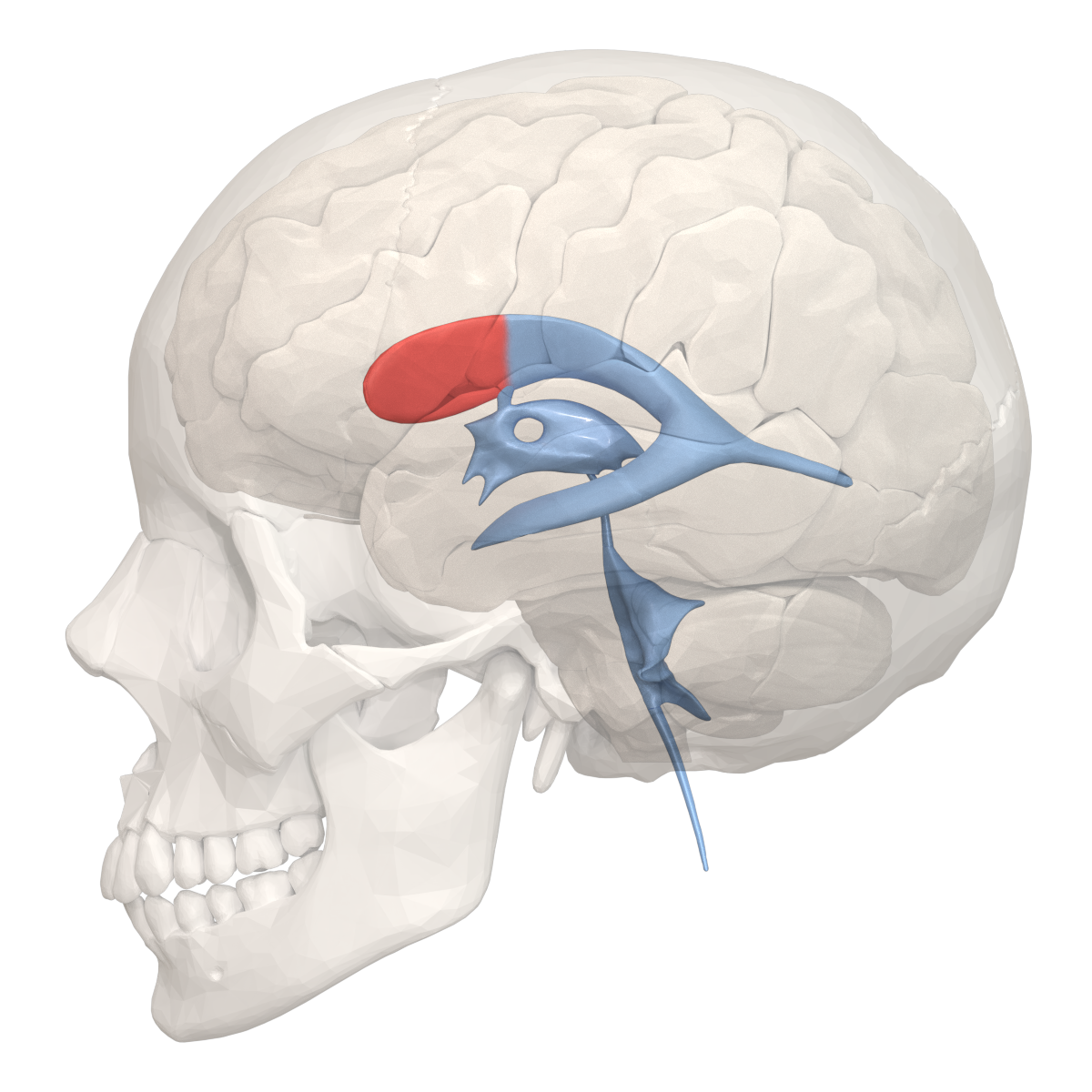
Anterior horn shown in red.

The anterior horn of the lateral ventricle is also known as the frontal horn as it extends into the frontal lobe. The anterior horn connects to the third ventricle, via the interventricular foramen. This portion of the lateral ventricle impinges on the frontal lobe, passing anteriorly and laterally, with slight inclination inferiorly. It is separated from the anterior horn of the other lateral ventricle by a thin neural sheet - septum pellucidum, which thus forms its medial boundary. The boundary facing exterior to the ventricle curvature is formed by the corpus callosum - the floor at the limit of the ventricle is the upper surface of the rostrum (the reflected portion of the corpus callosum), while nearer the body of the ventricle, the roof consists of the posterior surface of the genu. The remaining boundary - that facing interior to the ventricle curvature - comprises the posterior edge of the caudate nucleus. Frontal horn cysts are sometimes found on the frontal horn as a normal variant.

=== Body of the lateral ventricle ===
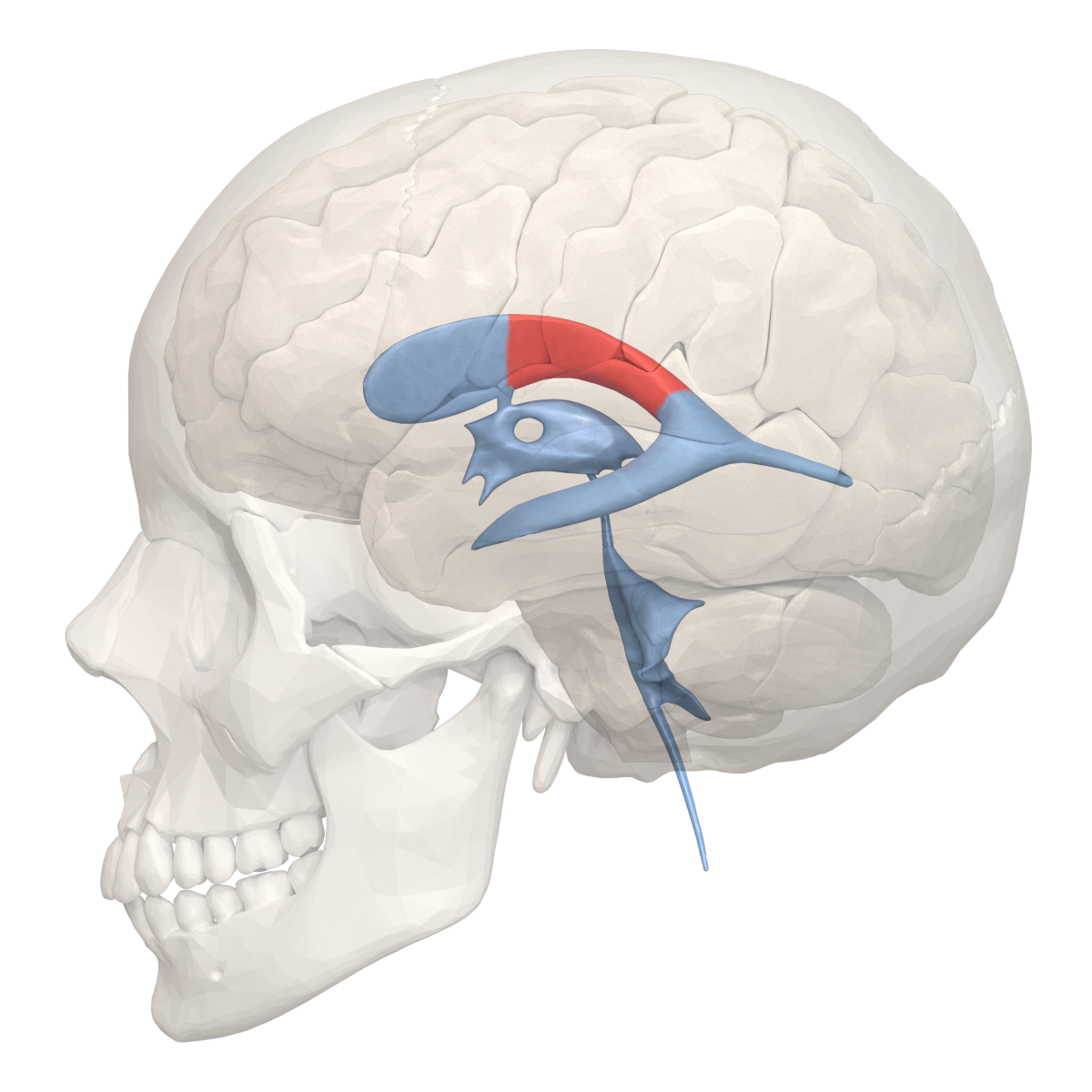
Body of lateral ventricle shown in red.

The body of the lateral ventricle, or central part is the part of the ventricle between the anterior horn and the trigone. Its roof is bound by the tapetum of the corpus callosum - and is separated medially from the other lateral ventricle by the septum pellucidum. The tail of the caudate nucleus forms the upper portion of the lateral edge, but it is not large enough to cover the whole boundary. Immediately below the tail of the caudate nucleus, the next portion of the lateral edge is formed by the comparatively narrow stria terminalis, which sits upon the superior thalamostriate vein. The main part of the fornix of the brain forms the next narrow portion of the lateral boundary, which is completed medially by a choroid plexus, which serves both ventricles.

=== Trigone of the lateral ventricle ===
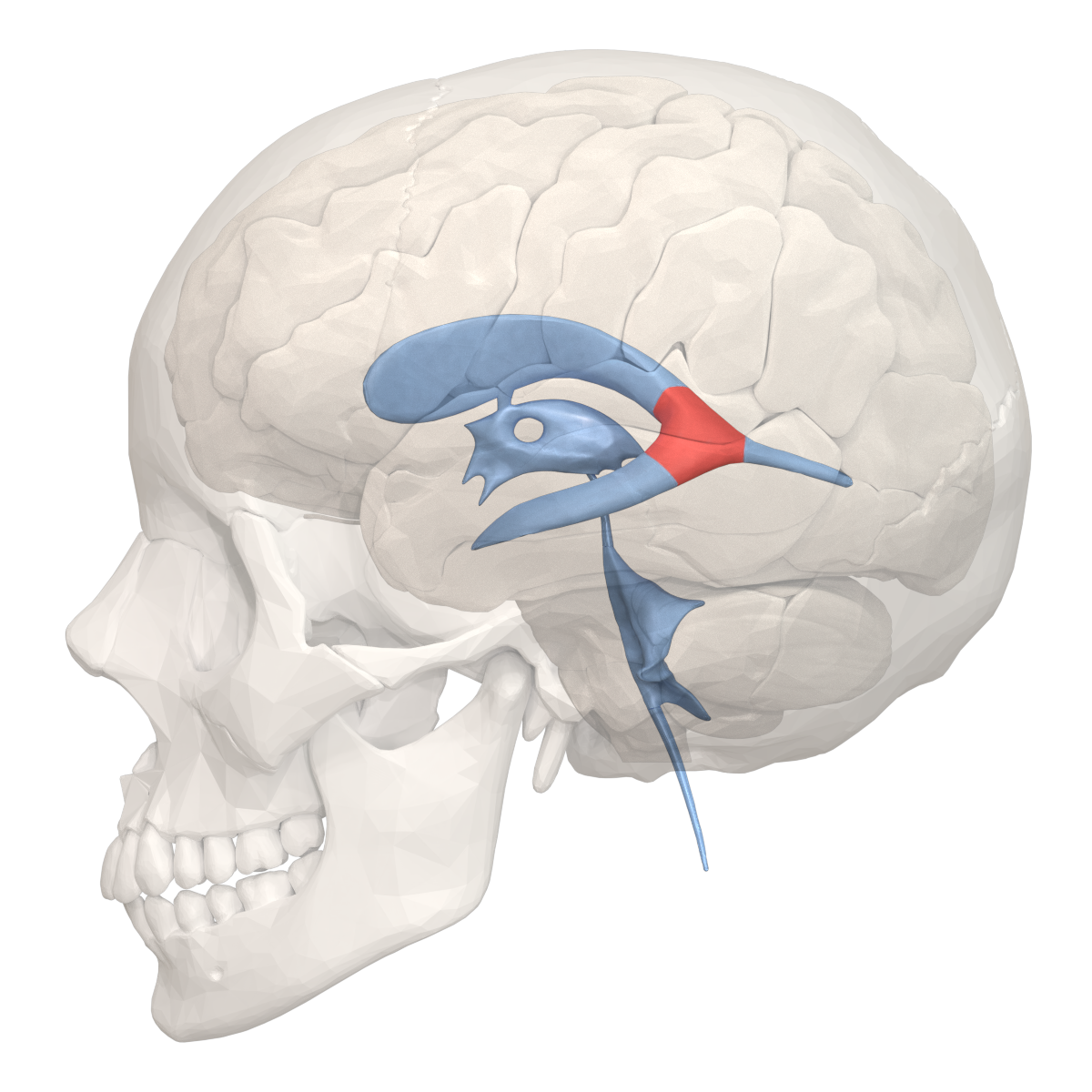
Trigone of lateral ventricle shown in red.

The trigone of the lateral ventricle is the area where the part of the body forms a junction with the inferior horn and the posterior horn. This area is referred to as the atrium of the lateral ventricle, and is where the choroid plexus is enlarged as the choroid glomus. As a triangular surface feature of the floor of this part of the lateral ventricle it is known as the collateral trigone.

=== Posterior horn of the lateral ventricle ===
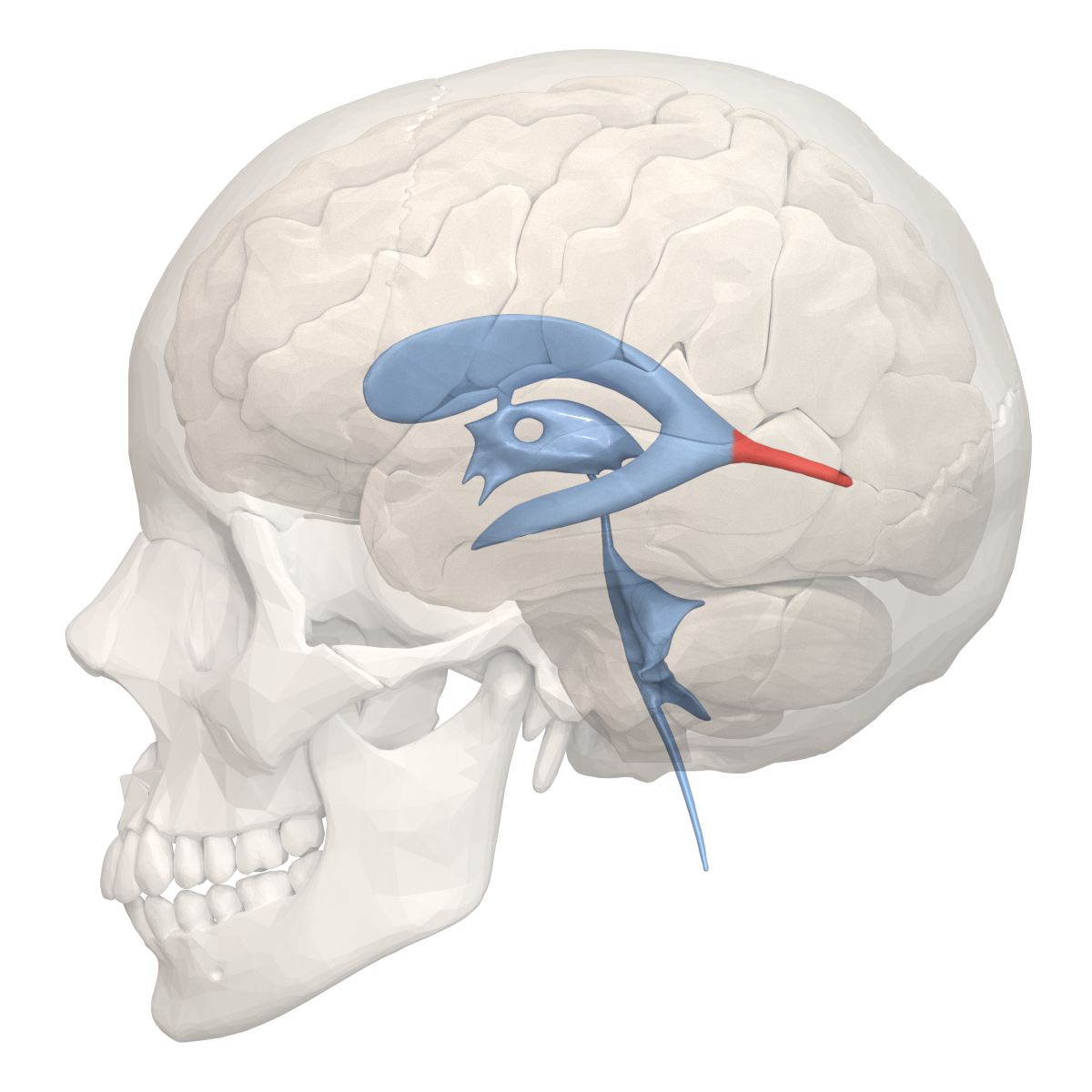
Posterior horn shown in red.

The posterior horn of lateral ventricle, or occipital horn, impinges into the occipital lobe in a posterior direction, initially laterally but subsequently curving medially and lilting inferiorly on the lateral side. The tapetum of the corpus callosum continues to form the roof, which due to the lilt is also the lateral edge. However, the posterior and anterior ends of the corpus callosum are characterized by tighter bundling, known as forceps (due to the resulting shape), to curve around the central sulci; the edge of these forceps form the upper part of the medial side of the posterior horn. The remainder of the medial edge of the ventricle is directly in contact with white matter of the cortex of the occipital lobe.

=== Inferior horn of the lateral ventricle ===
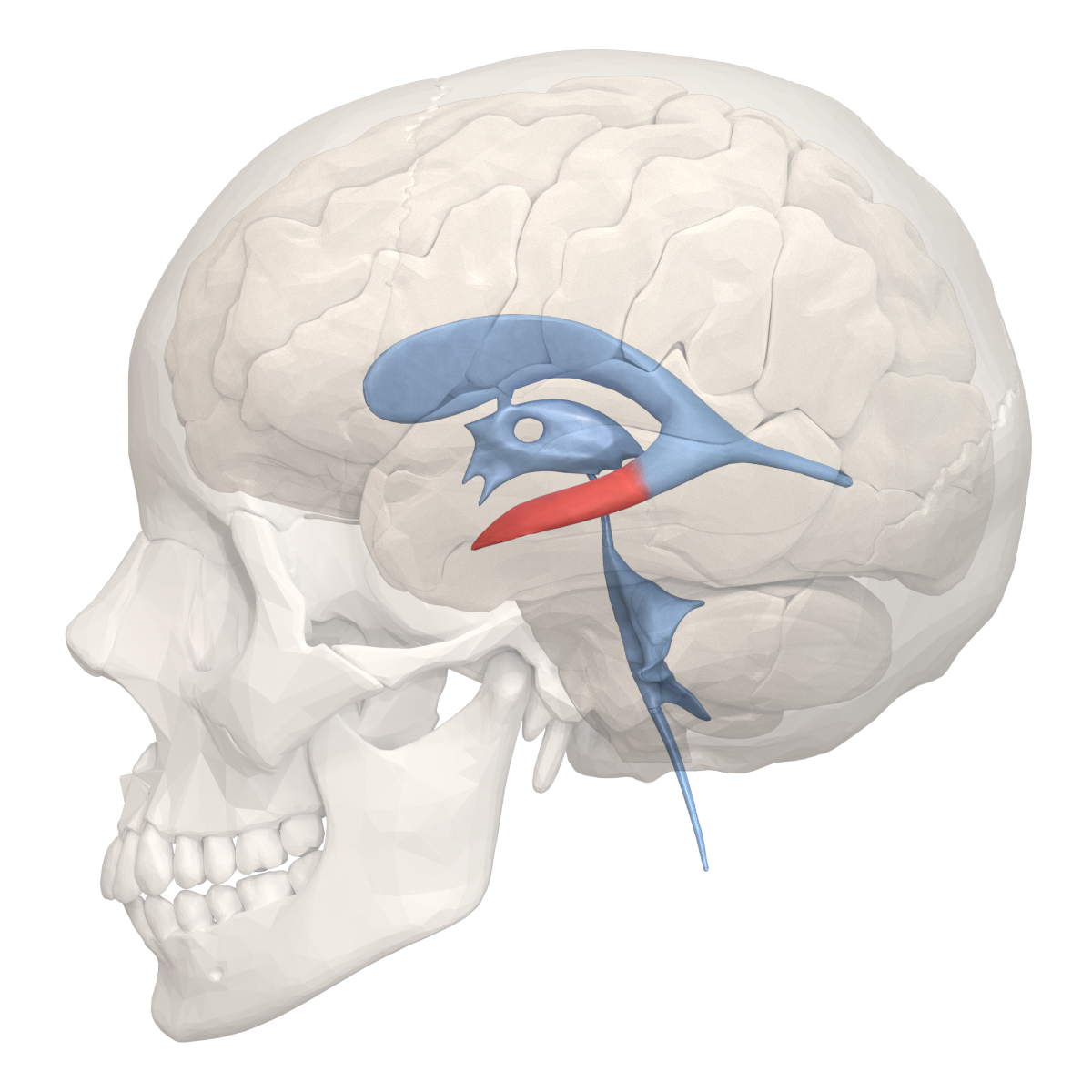
Inferior horn shown in red.

The inferior horn of the lateral ventricle, or temporal horn, is the largest of the horns. It extends anteriorly from the atrium beneath the thalamus and terminates at the amygdala. The collateral eminence and hippocampus form the floor, which is separated from the hippocampus by a white matter layer called the alveus, whereas the roof is formed by the thalamus, the caudate nucleus, and tapetum. The stria terminalis forms the remainder of the roof, which is narrower than at the body, and the choroid plexus occupies the medial wall.

The tapetum for the temporal lobe comprises the lateral boundary of the inferior horn, on its way to join the main tapetum above the body of the ventricle (passing over the caudate nucleus as it does so). The majority of the inferior horn's floor is formed by the fimbria of the hippocampus (from which the fornix emerges), and then, more anteriorly, by the hippocampus itself. As with the posterior horn, the remainder of the boundary (in this case, the lateral side of the floor) is directly in contact with the white matter of the surrounding lobe.

== Development ==
The lateral ventricles, similarly to other parts of the ventricular system of the brain, develop from the central canal of the neural tube. Specifically, the lateral ventricles originate from the portion of the tube that is present in the developing prosencephalon, and subsequently in the developing telencephalon.

During the first three months of prenatal development, the central canal expands into lateral, third, and fourth ventricles, connected by thinner channels. In the lateral ventricles, specialized areas – choroid plexuses – appear, which produce cerebrospinal fluid. The neural canal that does not expand and remains the same at the level of the midbrain superior to the fourth ventricle forms the cerebral aqueduct. The fourth ventricle narrows at the obex (in the caudal medulla), to become the central canal of the spinal cord.

During development, pressure from exterior structures causes a number of concave bulges to form within the lateral ventricles, which can be extremely variable in their degree of development; in some individuals they are ill-defined, while in others they can be prominent:

- from the forceps against the posterior horn - creating the bulb of the posterior cornu on the upper medial side of the horn
- from the calcarine sulcus against the posterior horn - creating the calcar avis (historically called the hippocampus minor, for visual reasons) on the lower medial side of the horn
- from the hippocampus against the inferior horn (on the medial floor of the horn)
- from the collateral sulcus against the inferior horn - creating the collateral eminence on the lateral floor of the horn.

Fetal lateral ventricles may be diagnosed using linear or planar measurements.

== Clinical significance ==
The volume of the lateral ventricles is enlarged in some neurological diseases, such as schizophrenia, bipolar disorder, major depressive disorder, and Alzheimer's disease.

Ventriculomegaly is a brain condition that mainly occurs during development when the lateral ventricles become dilated.

Asymmetry as an anatomical variation, in the size of the lateral ventricles is found in about 5–12% of the population. This has been associated with handedness, where right-handed people have been found to have a larger right lateral ventricle and a longer left posterior horn, whereas left-handed people have been found to have longer right posterior horns. A severe asymmetry, or an asymmetry with midline shift or diffuse enlargement, may indicate brain injury early in life, particularly in cases of a longer right posterior horn.

== Additional images ==
Position of lateral ventricles (shown in red)

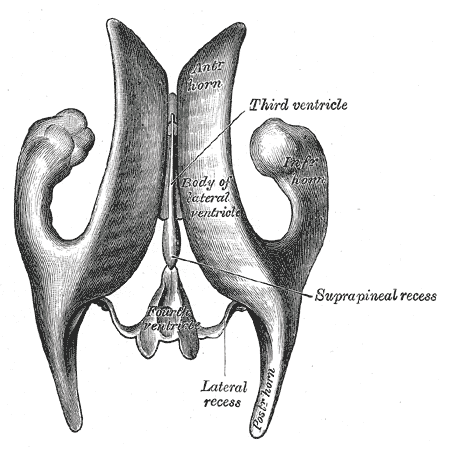
Drawing of a cast of the ventricular cavities, viewed from above

== See also ==
- Colpocephaly
- Choroid plexus
