= Superior medullary velum =

Thin layer between the superior cerebellar peduncles

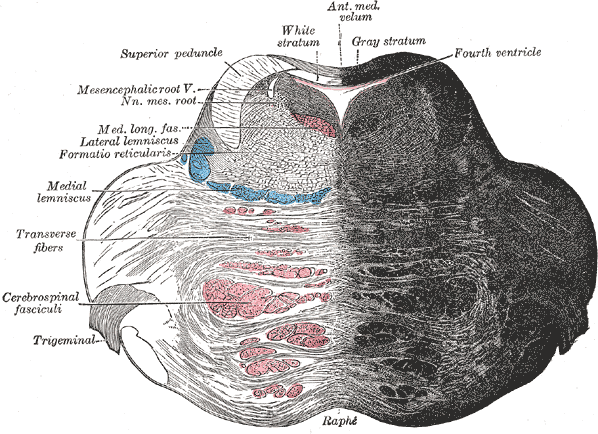
- Transverse section of the pons, at its upper part. (Ant. med. velum labeled at center top.)

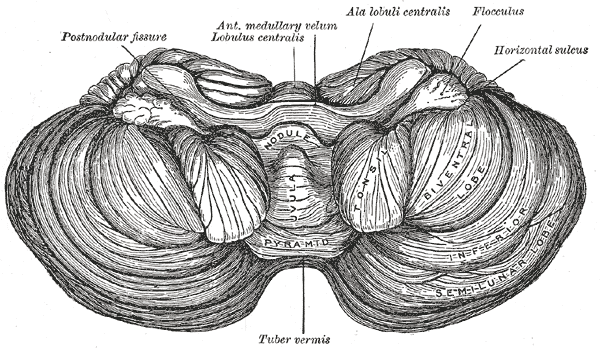
- Anterior view of the cerebellum. (Ant. medullary velum labeled at center top.)

Details

Identifiers
- Latin: velum medullare superius
- NeuroNames: 593
- NeuroLex ID: birnlex_1300
- TA98: A14.1.05.007; A14.1.05.719
- TA2: 5976
- FMA: 74508

The superior medullary velum (anterior medullary velum) is a thin, transparent lamina of white matter which - together with the inferior medullary velum - forms the roof of the fourth ventricle. It extends between the two superior cerebellar peduncles. The lingula of cerebellum covers - and adheres to - its dorsal surface.

== Anatomy ==
=== Relations ===
The superior medullary velum extends between the dorsomedial margins of the two superior cerebellar peduncles. On the dorsal surface of its lower half the folia and lingula are prolonged.

It forms, together with the superior cerebellar peduncle, the roof of the upper part of the fourth ventricle; it is narrow above, where it passes beneath the facial colliculi, and broader below, where it is continuous with the white substance of the superior vermis.

A slightly elevated ridge, the frenulum veli, descends upon its upper part from between the inferior colliculi, and on either side of this the trochlear nerve emerges.

=== Blood supply ===
Blood is supplied by branches from the superior cerebellar artery.

== Additional images ==
Scheme of roof of fourth ventricle. 1. Posterior medullary velum 2. Choroid plexus 3. Cisterna cerebellomedullaris of subarachnoid cavity 4. Central canal 5. Corpora quadrigemina 6. Cerebral peduncle 7. Anterior medullary velum 8. Ependymal lining of ventricle 9. Cisterna pontis of subarachnoid cavity (Arrow = Flow of cerebrospinal fluid (CSF) through foramen of Magendie)

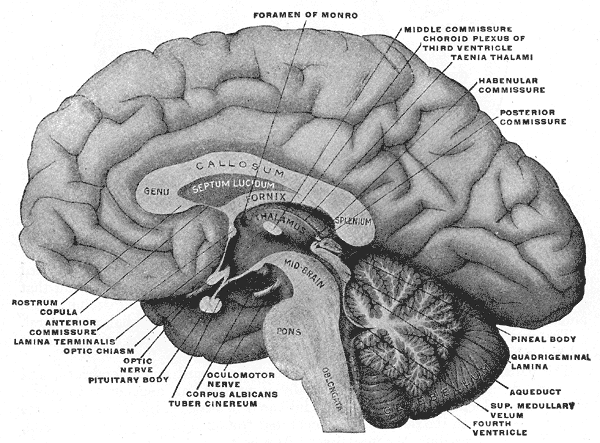
Mesal aspect of a brain sectioned in the median sagittal plane.

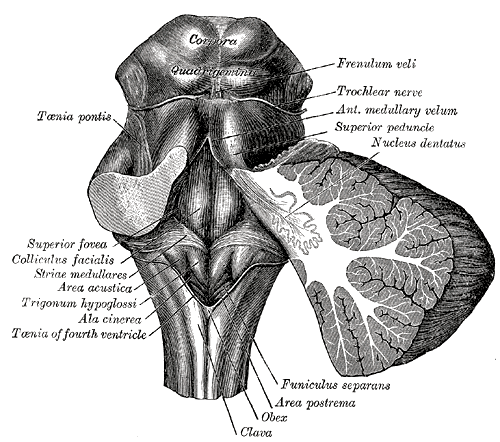
Rhomboid fossa.

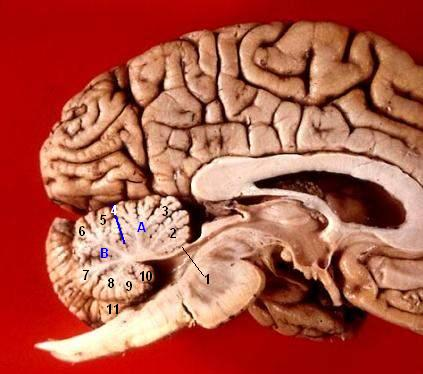
Human brain midsagittal view description

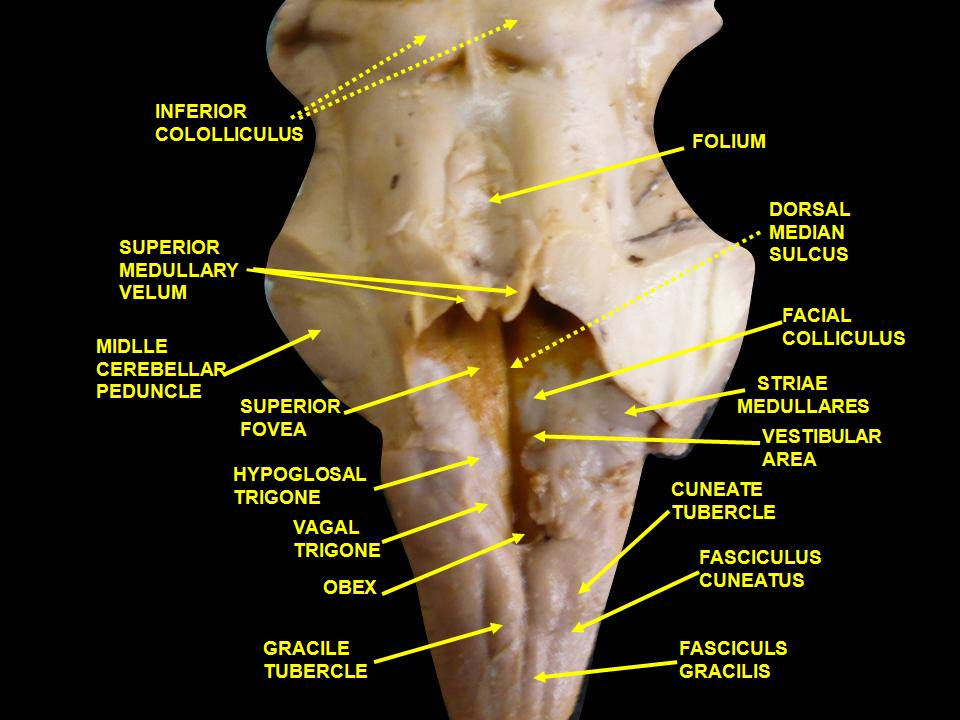
Fourth ventricle. Posterioe view.Deep dissection.

== See also ==
- Inferior medullary velum
