= List of diseases (S) =

This is a list of diseases starting with the letter "S".

== Sa ==
=== Saa–Sal ===
- Saal Bulas syndrome
- Saal Greenstein syndrome
- Sabinas brittle hair syndrome
- Saccharopinuria
- Sackey–Sakati–Aur syndrome
- Sacral agenesis
- Sacral defect anterior sacral meningocele
- Sacral hemangiomas multiple congenital abnormalities
- Sacral meningocele conotruncal heart defects
- Sacral plexopathy
- Sacrococcygeal dysgenesis association
- Sadistic personality disorder
- Saethre–Chotzen syndrome
- Saito–Kuba–Tsuruta syndrome
- Sakati syndrome
- Salcedo syndrome
- Salivary disorder
- Salivary gland disorders
- Salla disease
- Sallis–Beighton syndrome
- Salmonellosis (Salmonella infections)
- Salti–Salem syndrome
- Salice Disease

=== Sam–Say ===
- Sammartino–Decreccio syndrome
- Samson–Gardner syndrome
- Samson–Viljoen syndrome
- Sanderson–Fraser syndrome
- Sandhaus–Ben Ami syndrome
- Sandhoff disease
- Sandrow–Sullivan–Steel syndrome
- Sanfilippo syndrome
- Santavuori disease
- Santos–Mateus–Leal syndrome
- SAPHO syndrome
- Sarcoidosis, pulmonary
- Sarcoidosis
- Sarcoma, granulocytic
- Sarcosinemia
- Satoyoshi syndrome
- Savisky syndrome
- Saul–Wilkes–Stevenson syndrome
- Say–Barber–Hobbs syndrome
- Say–Barber–Miller syndrome
- Say–Carpenter–syndrome
- Say–Field–Coldwell syndrome
- Say–Meyer syndrome

== Sc ==
=== Sca ===
- Scabies
- Scab Face
- SCAD deficiency
- Scalp defects postaxial polydactyly
- Scalp–ear–nipple syndrome
- Scapuloiliac dysostosis
- Scapuloperoneal myopathy
- SCARF syndrome
- Scarlet fever

=== Sch ===
==== Scha–Schm ====
- Schaap–Taylor–Baraitser syndrome
- Schaefer–Stein–Oshman syndrome
- Schamberg's disease pigmentation disorder
- Schamberg's disease
- Scheie syndrome
- Schereshevskij Turner
- Scheuermann's disease
- Schimke syndrome
- Schindler disease
- Schinzel–Giedion syndrome
- Schinzel syndrome
- Schinzel–Giedion midface retraction syndrome
- Schisis association
- Schistosomiasis
- Schizencephaly
- Schizoaffective disorder
- Schizoid personality disorder
- Schizophrenia
  - Schizophrenia, genetic types
- Schizophrenia intellectual disability deafness retinitis
- Schizophreniform disorder
- Schizotypal personality disorder
- Schlegelberger–Grote syndrome
- Schmidt syndrome
- Schmitt Gillenwater Kelly syndrome

==== Schn–Schw ====
- Schneckenbecken dysplasia
- Schofer–Beetz–Bohl syndrome
- Scholte–Begeer–Van Essen syndrome
- Schraderman's disease
- Schrander–Stumpel–Theunissen–Hulsmans syndrome
- Schroer–Hammer–Mauldin syndrome
- Upshaw–Schülman syndrome
- Schwannoma, malignant
- Schwannomatosis
- Schwartz–Newark syndrome
- Schwartz–Jampel syndrome
- Schwartz–lelek syndrome
- Schweitzer–Kemink–Malcolm syndrome

=== Sci–Scr ===
- Sciatica
- Scimitar syndrome
- Scleredema
- Scleroatonic myopathy
- Sclerocornea, syndactyly, ambiguous genitalia
- Scleroderma
- Scleromyxedema
- Sclerosing bone dysplasia mental retardation
- Sclerosing cholangitis
- Sclerosing lymphocytic lobulitis
- Sclerosing mesenteritis
- Sclerosteosis
- Sclerotylosis
- SCOT deficiency
- Scott–Bryant–Graham syndrome
- Scott syndrome
- Scrapie

=== Scu ===
- Scurvy

=== Sco ===
- Scoliosis
  - Scoliosis as part of NF
  - Scoliosis with unilateral unsegmented bar
- Scotoma

== Se ==
=== Sea–Sei ===
- Sea-blue histiocytosis
- Seafood poisoning
- Seal finger
- Seasonal affective disorder
- Seaver–Cassidy syndrome
- Sebocystomatosis
- Secernentea Infections
- Seckel like syndrome Majoor–Krakauer type
- Seckel like syndrome type Buebel
- Seckel syndrome 2
- Seckel syndrome
- Secondary pulmonary hypertension
- Seemanova–Lesny syndrome
- Seemanova syndrome type 2
- Seghers syndrome
- Segmental neurofibromatosis
- Segmental vertebral anomalies
- Seizures benign familial neonatal recessive form
- Seizures mental retardation hair dysplasia

=== Sel–Seq ===
- Selective mutism
- Selenium poisoning
- Self-defeating personality disorder
- Selig–Benacerraf–Greene syndrome
- Seminoma
- Semmerkrot–Haraldsson–Weenaes syndrome
- Sener syndrome
- Sengers–Hamel–Otten syndrome
- Senior syndrome
- Senior–Løken syndrome
- Sennetsu fever
- Sensenbrenner syndrome
- Sensorineural hearing loss
- Sensory neuropathy type 1
- Sensory processing disorder
- Sensory neuropathy
- Sensory radicular neuropathy recessive form
- Senter syndrome
- Seow–Najjar syndrome
- Separation anxiety disorder
- Sepsis
- Septic shock
- Septooptic dysplasia digital anomalies
- Septo-optic dysplasia
- Sequeiros–Sack syndrome

=== Ser–Sez ===
- Seres–Santamaria–Arimany–Muniz syndrome
- Serum sickness
- Serious digitalis intoxication
- Setleis syndrome
- Severe acute respiratory syndrome (SARS)
- Severe combined immunodeficiency (SCID)
- Severe infantile axonal neuropathy
- Sex chromosome disorders
- Sexual aversion disorder
- Sexually transmitted disease
- Sézary syndrome
- Sézary's lymphoma

== Sh ==
=== Sha–Shi ===
- Shapiro syndrome
- Shared psychotic disorder
- Sharma–Kapoor–Ramji syndrome
- Sharp syndrome
- Shaver's disease
- Sheehan syndrome
- Shellfish poisoning
  - Shellfish poisoning, amnesic (ASP)
  - Shellfish poisoning, diarrheal (DSP)
  - Shellfish poisoning, neurotoxic (NSP)
  - Shellfish poisoning, paralytic (PSP)
- Shigellosis
- Shingles
- Shith–Filkins syndrome

=== Sho ===
- Shock
- Shokeir syndrome

==== Shor ====
===== Short b – Short r =====
- Short bowel syndrome
- Short broad great toe macrocranium
- Short-chain acyl-CoA dehydrogenase deficiency
- Short limb dwarf lethal Colavita–Kozlowski type
- Short limb dwarf lethal Mcalister–Crane type
- Short limb dwarf oedema iris coloboma
- Short limb dwarfism Al Gazali type
- Short limbs abnormal face congenital heart disease
- Short limbs subluxed knees cleft palate
- Short QT syndrome
- Short rib syndrome Beemer type
- Short rib-polydactyly syndrome
  - Short rib-polydactyly syndrome, Beermer type
  - Short rib-polydactyly syndrome, Majewski type
  - Short rib-polydactyly syndrome, Saldino-Noonan type
  - Short rib-polydactyly syndrome, Verma-Naumoff type
- Short ribs craniosynostosis polysyndactyly

===== Short s =====
- Short stature abnormal skin pigmentation mental retardation
- Short stature Brussels type
- Short stature contractures hypotonia
- Short stature cranial hyperostosis hepatomegaly
- Short stature deafness neutrophil dysfunction
- Short stature dysmorphic face pelvic scapula dysplasia
- Short stature heart defect craniofacial anomalies
- Short stature hyperkaliemia acidosis
- Short stature locking fingers
- Short stature mental retardation eye anomalies
- Short stature mental retardation eye defects
- Short stature microcephaly heart defect
- Short stature microcephaly seizures deafness
- Short stature monodactylous ectrodactyly cleft palate
- Short stature prognathism short femoral necks
- Short stature Robin sequence cleft mandible hand anomalies clubfoot
- Short stature talipes natal teeth
- Short stature valvular heart disease
- Short stature webbed neck heart disease
- Short stature wormian bones dextrocardia
- Short syndrome

===== Short t =====
- Short tarsus absence of lower eyelashes

==== Shou ====
- Shoulder and thorax deformity congenital heart disease
- Shoulder girdle defect mental retardation familial

=== Shp–Shy ===
- Shprintzen–Golberg craniosynostosis
- Shprintzen syndrome
- Shwachman syndrome
- Shwachman–Bodian–Diamond syndrome
- Shwartzman phenomenon
- Shy–Drager syndrome

== Si ==
=== Sia–Sim ===
- Sialadenitis
- Sialidosis type 1 and 3
- Sialidosis
- Sialuria, French type
- Sickle cell anemia
- Sideroblastic anemia, autosomal
- Siderosis
- Siegler–Brewer–Carey syndrome
- Silengo–Lerone–Pelizzo syndrome
- Silent sinus syndrome
- Silicosiderosis
- Silicosis
- Sillence syndrome
- Silver–Russell syndrome
- Silvery hair syndrome
- Simian B virus infection
- Simosa–Penchaszadeh–Bustos syndrome
- Simpson–Golabi–Behmel syndrome

=== Sin–Six ===
- Singh–Chhaparwal–Dhanda syndrome
- Single upper central incisor
- Single ventricular heart
- Singleton Merten syndrome
- Sino-auricular heart block
- Sinus cancer
- Sinus histiocytosis
- Sinus node disease and myopia
- Sipple syndrome
- Sirenomelia
- Sitophobia
- Sitosterolemia
- Situs inversus totalis with cystic dysplasia of kidneys and pancreas
- Situs inversus viscerum-cardiopathy
- Situs inversus, X linked
- Sixth nerve palsy

== Sj–Sn ==
- Sjögren–Larsson syndrome
- Sjögren's syndrome
- Skandaitis
- Skeletal dysplasia brachydactyly
- Skeletal dysplasia epilepsy short stature
- Skeletal dysplasia orofacial anomalies
- Skeletal dysplasia San diego type
- Skeletal dysplasias
- Skeleto cardiac syndrome with thrombocytopenia
- Sketetal dysplasia coarse facies mental retardation
- Skin cancer
- Skin peeling syndrome
- Slapped cheek syndrome
- Slavotinek Hurst syndrome
- Sleepwalking disorder
- Sly syndrome
- Small cell lung cancer
- Small intestinal bacterial overgrowth
- Small intestinal fungal overgrowth
- Small uncloven cell lymphoma
- Smallpox
- Smet–Fabry–Fryns syndrome
- Smith–Fineman–Myers syndrome
- Smith–Lemli–Opitz syndrome
- Smith–Martin–Dodd syndrome
- Smith–Magenis syndrome
- Sneddon's syndrome

== So ==
- Social anxiety disorder
- Sociophobia
- Soft-tissue sarcoma
- Sohval–Soffer syndrome
- Somatization disorder
- Somatostatinoma
- Sommer–Hines syndrome
- Sommer–Rathbun–Battles syndrome
- Sommer–Young–Wee–Frye syndrome
- Sondheimer syndrome
- Sonoda syndrome
- Sorsby's fundus dystrophy
- Sotos syndrome
- Southwestern Athabaskan genetic diseases

== Sp ==
=== Spa ===
==== Spar ====
- Sparse hair ptosis mental retardation

==== Spas ====
===== Spasm =====
- Spasmodic dysphonia
- Spasmodic torticollis

===== Spast =====
====== Spasti ======
Spastic a – Spastic d

- Spastic angina with healthy coronary artery
- Spastic ataxia Charlevoix–Saguenay type
- Spastic diplegia infantile type
- Spastic dysphonia

Spastic p

- Spastic paraparesis deafness
- Spastic paraparesis, infantile
- Spastic paraparesis
- Spastic paraplegia epilepsy mental retardation
- Spastic paraplegia facial cutaneous lesions
- Spastic paraplegia familial autosomal recessive form
- Spastic paraplegia glaucoma precocious puberty
- Spastic paraplegia mental retardation corpus callosum
- Spastic paraplegia nephritis deafness
- Spastic paraplegia neuropathy poikiloderma
- Spastic paraplegia type 1, X-linked
- Spastic paraplegia type 2, X-linked
- Spastic paraplegia type 3, dominant
- Spastic paraplegia type 4, dominant
- Spastic paraplegia type 5A, recessive
- Spastic paraplegia type 5B, recessive
- Spastic paraplegia type 6, dominant
- Spastic paraplegia, familial
- Spastic paresis glaucoma mental retardation
- Spastic quadriplegia retinitis pigmentosa mental retardation
- Spasticity mental retardation
- Spasticity multiple exostoses
- Spatic paraparesis vitiligo premature graying

=== Spe–Sph ===
- Specific phobia
- Spellacy gibbs watts syndrome
- Spermatogenesis arrest
- Spherocytosis
- Spherophakia brachymorphia syndrome
- Sphingolipidosis

=== Spi ===
==== Spie ====
- Spielmeyer–Vogt disease

==== Spin ====
===== Spina–Spine =====
- Spina bifida
- Spina bifida hypospadias
- Spinal and bulbar muscular atrophy
- Spinal atrophy ophthalmoplegia pyramidal syndrome
- Spinal cord disorder
- Spinal cord injury
- Spinal cord neoplasm
- Spinal dysostosis type Anhalt
- Spinal muscular atrophy
- Spinal muscular atrophy with congenital bone fractures
- Spinal muscular atrophy with lower extremity predominance 1
- Spinal muscular atrophy with lower extremity predominance 2
- Spinal muscular atrophy with pontocerebellar hypoplasia
- Spinal muscular atrophy with progressive myoclonic epilepsy
- Spinal muscular atrophy with respiratory distress type 1
- Spinal shock
- Spine rigid cardiomyopathy

===== Spino =====
- Spinocerebellar ataxia (multiple types)
- Spinocerebellar ataxia amyotrophy deafness
- Spinocerebellar ataxia dysmorphism
- Spinocerebellar atrophy type 3
- Spinocerebellar degeneration corneal dystrophy
- Spinocerebellar degenerescence book type

==== Spir ====
- Spirochetes disease
- Spirurida infections

=== Spl ===
- Spleen neoplasm
- Splenic agenesis syndrome
- Splenic flexure syndrome
- Splenogonadal fusion limb defects micrognatia
- Splenomegaly
- Split hand deformity mandibulofacial dysostosis
- Split hand split foot malformation autosomal reces
- Split hand split foot mandibular hypoplasia
- Split hand split foot-nystagmus syndrome
- Split hand split foot X linked
- Split hand urinary anomalies spina bifida
- Split-hand deformity

=== Spo ===
==== Spon ====
===== Spona =====
- Sponastrime dysplasia

===== Spond =====
====== Spondy ======
Spondyla–Spondyli

- Spondylarthritis
- Spondylarthropathies
- Spondylarthropathy
- Spondylitis

Spondylo

- Spondylo camptodactyly syndrome
- Spondylo costal dysostosis dandy walker
- Spondylocarpotarsal synostosis
- Spondylocostal dysplasia dominant
- Spondylodysplasia brachyolmia
- Spondyloenchondrodysplasia
- Spondyloepimetaphyseal dysplasia congenita, Iraqi
- Spondyloepimetaphyseal dysplasia, Strudwick type
- Spondyloepimetaphyseal dysplasia joint laxity
- Spondyloepimetaphyseal dysplasia
- Spondyloepiphyseal dysplasia nephrotic syndrome
- Spondyloepiphyseal dysplasia tarda progressive art
- Spondyloepiphyseal dysplasia tarda
- Spondyloepiphyseal dysplasia, congenital type
- Spondyloepiphyseal dysplasia
- Spondylohypoplasia arthrogryposis popliteal pteryg
- Spondylolisthesis
- Spondylometaphyseal dysplasia, 'corner fracture' t
- Spondylometaphyseal dysplasia, Schmidt type
- Spondylometaphyseal dysplasia, Sedaghatian type
- Spondylometaphyseal dysplasia, X-linked
- Spondylometaphyseal dysplasia
- Spondyloperipheral dysplasia short ulna

===== Spong–Spont =====
- Spongiform encephalopathy
- Spongy degeneration of central nervous system
- Spontaneous periodic hypothermia
- Spontaneous pneumothorax familial type

==== Spor–Spot ====
- Sporotrichosis
- Spotted fever

=== Spr ===
- Spranger schinzel yers syndrome
- Sprengel deformity

== Sq–Ss ==
- Squamous cell carcinoma
- SSADH (succinic semialdehyde dehydrogenase deficiency)
- SSPE (subacute sclerosing panencephalitis)

== St ==
- St. Anthony's fire

=== Sta–Ste ===
- Stalker chitayat syndrome
- Stampe sorensen syndrome
- Staphylococcal infection
  - Staphylococcus aureus infection
  - Staphylococcus epidermidis infection
- Staphylococcal scalded skin syndrome
- Stargardt disease
- Steatocystoma multiplex natal teeth
- Steatocystoma multiplex
- Steele–Richardson–Olszewski syndrome, atypical
- Steinfeld syndrome
- Stein–Leventhal syndrome
- Sterility due to immotile flagella
- Stern–Lubinsky–Durrie syndrome
- Sternal cleft
- Sternal cyst vascular anomalies
- Sternal malformation vascular dysplasia association
- Steroid dehydrogenase deficiency dental anomalies
- Stevens–Johnson syndrome

=== Sti–Sto ===
- Stickler syndrome
  - Stickler syndrome, type 1
  - Stickler syndrome, type 2
  - Stickler syndrome, type 3
- Stiff person syndrome
- Stiff skin syndrome
- Still's disease
- Stimmler syndrome
- Stimulant psychosis
- Stoelinga–De Koomen–davis syndrome
- Stoll–Alembik–Dott syndrome
- Stoll–Alembik–Finck syndrome
- Stoll–Geraudel–Chauvin syndrome
- Stoll–Kieny–Dott syndrome
- Stoll–Levy–Francfort syndrome
- Stomachache
- Stomach cancer, familial
- Stomach cancer
- Stomatitis
- Storage pool platelet disease
- Stormorken–Sjaastad–Langslet syndrome

=== Str–Stu ===
- Strabismus
- Stratton–Garcia–Young syndrome
- Stratton–Parker syndrome
- Streeter's dysplasia (Amniotic band syndrome)
- Streptococcus, Group B
- Strep throat
- Striatonigral degeneration infantile
- Strømme syndrome
- Strongyloidiasis
- Strudwick syndrome
- Strumpell–Lorrain disease
- Strychnine poisoning
- Stuart factor deficiency, congenital
- Stuccokeratosis
- Sturge–Weber syndrome
- Stuve–Wiedemann dysplasia
- Stye

== Su ==
=== Sub–Sum ===
- Subacute cerebellar degeneration
- Subacute sclerosing leucoencephalitis
- Subacute sclerosing panencephalitis
- Subaortic stenosis short stature syndrome
- Subcortical laminar heterotopia
- Subependymal nodular heterotopia
- Subpulmonary stenosis
- Subvalvular aortic stenosis
- Succinate coenzyme Q reductase deficiency of
- Succinic acidemia lactic acidosis congenital
- Succinic acidemia
- Succinic semialdehyde dehydrogenase deficiency
- Succinyl-CoA acetoacetate transferase deficiency
- Sucrase-isomaltase deficiency
- Sucrose intolerance
- Sudden cardiac death
- Sudden infant death syndrome
- Sudden sniffing death syndrome
- Sugarman syndrome
- Sulfatidosis juvenile, Austin type
- Sulfite and xanthine oxydase deficiency
- Sulfite oxidase deficiency
- Summitt syndrome
- Sunburn

=== Sup–Sut ===
- Superior mesenteric artery syndrome
- Superior oblique myokymia
- Super mesozoic-dysentery complex
- Supranuclear ocular palsy
- Supraumbilical midabdominal raphe and facial cavernous hemangiomas
- Suriphobia
- Susac syndrome
- Sutherland–Haan syndrome
- Sutton disease II
- Sutton disease II

== Sw ==
- Sweeley–Klionsky disease
- Sweet syndrome
- Swimmer's ear
- Swyer–James–McLeod syndrome
- Swyer syndrome
- Sweatalitus disease
- Swine influenza (H1F1)

== Sy ==
=== Syb–Sym ===
- Sybert–Smith syndrome
- Sydenham's chorea
- Symmetrical thalamic calcifications
- Symphalangism brachydactyly craniosynostosis
- Symphalangism brachydactyly
- Symphalangism Cushing type
- Symphalangism distal
- Symphalangism familial proximal
- Symphalangism short stature accessory testis
- Symphalangism with multiple anomalies of hands and feet
- Symphalangism, distal, with microdontia, dental pulp stones, and narrowed zygomatic arch

=== Syn ===
==== Sync–Syng ====
- Syncamptodactyly scoliosis
- Syncopal paroxysmal tachycardia
- Syncopal tachyarythmia
- Syncope
- Syndactyly
  - Syndactyly between 4 and 5
  - Syndactyly cataract mental retardation
  - Syndactyly–Cenani–Lenz type
  - Syndactyly ectodermal dysplasia cleft lip palate hand foot
  - Syndactyly type 1 microcephaly mental retardation
  - Syndactyly type 2
  - Syndactyly type 3
  - Syndactyly type 5
- Syndactyly-polydactyly-ear lobe syndrome
- Syndrome of inappropriate antidiuretic hormone
- Syndrome X
- Synechia
- Synesthesia
- Syngnathia cleft palate
- Syngnathia multiple anomalies

==== Syno–Synp ====
- Synostosis of talus and calcaneus short stature
- Synovial cancer
- Synovial osteochondromatosis
- Synovial sarcoma
- Synovialosarcoma
- Synovitis acne pustulosis hyperostosis osteitis
- Synovitis granulomatous uveitis cranial neuropathi
- Synovitis
- Synpolydactyly

=== Syp–Sys ===
- Syphilis embryopathy
- Syphilis
- Syringobulbia
- Syringocystadenoma papilliferum
- Syringomas
- Syringomas natal teeth oligodontia
- Syringomelia hyperkeratosis
- Syringomyelia
- Systemic arterio-veinous fistula
- Systemic carnitine deficiency
- Systemic lupus erythematosus
- Systemic mastocytosis
- Systemic necrotizing angeitis
- Systemic sclerosis
