= Mehul Dattani =

British paediatric endocrinologist

- Born: Kampala,Uganda
- Education: Middlesex Hospital Medical School
- Occupation: Paediatric endocrinology
- Employer(s): University College London; Great Ormond Street Hospital; University College London Hospital
- Known for: Research on the genetic basis of congenital hypopituitarism and hypothalamic–pituitary development

Mehul Tulsidas Dattani is a British paediatric endocrinologist whose research concerns the genetic regulation of hypothalamic and pituitary development. His work has examined congenital hypopituitarism, septo-optic dysplasia and other rare paediatric endocrine disorders, including studies of the developmental genes HESX1, SOX2, LHX4, ARNT2 and IGSF1. He is Professor of Paediatric Endocrinology at the UCL Great Ormond Street Institute of Child Health and a consultant at Great Ormond Street Hospital and University College London Hospital.

== Education and career ==
Dattani studied medicine at Middlesex Hospital Medical School, graduating in 1984, and completed an MD in 1994. At UCL, he leads a research group within the Molecular Basis of Rare Diseases section. He served as specialty lead in endocrinology at Great Ormond Street Hospital until 2023. Dattani served as Chair of the Programme Organising Committee of the European Society for Paediatric Endocrinology until 2021 and is the current President of the society.

== Research ==
=== Genetic regulation of pituitary development ===
Dattani's research is centred on the molecular mechanisms that form the hypothalamic–pituitary axis. In 2009, Dattani and colleagues described pituitary development as a genetic cascade involving signalling molecules and transcription factors that regulate organ commitment, cell differentiation and cell proliferation. Disruption of these processes can result in congenital hypopituitarism, including combined pituitary hormone deficiencies and syndromic disorders. His UCL group combines clinical characterisation of patients with genetic studies and experimental models to investigate the causes and progression of these disorders.

=== HESX1 and septo-optic dysplasia ===
In 1998, Dattani and colleagues reported mutations in the homeobox gene HESX1 in association with septo-optic dysplasia in humans and mice. His later studies examined how particular HESX1 variants affect interactions between transcriptional repressors and corepressors, and how those changes relate to evolving pituitary hormone deficiencies. The research helped connect a developmental regulatory gene with the variable clinical features of congenital pituitary disease.

=== Developmental genes and rare endocrine syndromes ===
Dattani's collaborative work has extended to other genes involved in pituitary and forebrain development. A 2006 study linked mutations affecting SOX2 with abnormalities of the hypothalamic–pituitary–gonadal axis in mice and humans. In 2013, a study co-authored by Dattani associated an ARNT2 mutation with a syndrome involving hypopituitarism, post-natal microcephaly, visual abnormalities and renal anomalies. He also participated in research that identified loss-of-function variants in IGSF1 in an X-linked syndrome of central hypothyroidism and testicular enlargement.

Dattani's group has additionally studied developmental pathways involving transcription factor 7-like 1 and used genomic sequencing to investigate undiagnosed rare endocrine disorders. More recently, a collaborative study identified functionally significant variants in BRAF that were associated with Septo-Optic Dysplasia and a Rasopathy, Cardiofaciocutaneous syndrome.

=== Growth regulation and additional genetic disorders ===
Dattani has also contributed to research on genetic disorders affecting growth and endocrine function outside the core group of pituitary-development transcription factors. A 2018 study reported dominant-negative STAT5B variants in patients with short stature, growth-hormone insensitivity and mild immune dysregulation. In 2019, Dattani and colleagues described impaired EIF2S3 function associated with an X-linked phenotype that included hypopituitarism and glucose dysregulation.

Dattani and his collaborators also described the first mutation in the gene encoding the thyroid hormone receptor alpha (THRA), associated with a novel phenotype including growth retardation, skeletal and gastrointestinal abnormalities, and intellectual deficit. The UCL group also conducts longitudinal clinical and genomic studies of septo-optic dysplasia, multiple pituitary hormone deficiency and growth-hormone deficiency. These projects examine how genetic findings, imaging and clinical features relate to the progression and management of disease.

== Honours ==
In 2023, Dattani was elected a Fellow of the Academy of Medical Sciences. The academy and UCL cited his contributions to understanding and managing rare paediatric endocrine disorders.

In 2025, Dattani received the European Society for Paediatric Endocrinology (ESPE) Research Award in recognition of his contributions to paediatric endocrine research.

== Selected publications ==
- Dattani, M. T.; et al. (1998). “Mutations in the homeobox gene HESX1/Hesx1 associated with septo-optic dysplasia in human and mouse”. Nature Genetics. 19 (2): 125–133. doi:10.1038/477.
- Kelberman, D.; et al. (2006). “Mutations within Sox2/SOX2 are associated with abnormalities in the hypothalamo-pituitary-gonadal axis in mice and humans”. Journal of Clinical Investigation. 116 (9): 2442–2455. doi:10.1172/JCI28658.
- Kelberman, D.; Rizzoti, K.; Lovell-Badge, R.; Robinson, I. C. A. F.; Dattani, M. T. (2009). “Genetic regulation of pituitary gland development in human and mouse”. Endocrine Reviews. 30 (7): 790–829. doi:10.1210/er.2009-0008.
- Sun, Y.; et al. (2012). “Loss-of-function mutations in IGSF1 cause an X-linked syndrome of central hypothyroidism and testicular enlargement”. Nature Genetics. 44 (12): 1375–1381. doi:10.1038/ng.2453.
- Webb, E. A.; et al. (2013). “ARNT2 mutation causes hypopituitarism, post-natal microcephaly, visual and renal anomalies”. Brain. 136 (10): 3096–3105. doi:10.1093/brain/awt218.
- Gaston-Massuet, C.; et al. (2016). “Transcription factor 7-like 1 is involved in hypothalamo-pituitary axis development in mice and humans”. Proceedings of the National Academy of Sciences. 113 (5): E548–E557. doi:10.1073/pnas.1503346113.
- Klammt, J.; et al. (2018). “Dominant-negative STAT5B mutations cause growth hormone insensitivity with short stature and mild immune dysregulation”. Nature Communications. 9: 2105. doi:10.1038/s41467-018-04521-0.
- Gregory, L. C.; et al. (2019). “Impaired EIF2S3 function associated with a novel phenotype of X-linked hypopituitarism with glucose dysregulation”. EBioMedicine. 42: 470–480. doi:10.1016/j.ebiom.2019.03.013.
