= Georges de Morsier =

Swiss neurologist (1894–1982)

- Born: 25 February 1894; Paris
- Died: 9 January 1982; Geneva
- Citizenship: Swiss
- Education: University of Geneva
- Occupation: Neurologist
- Years active: 1920s–1970s
- Known for: Classifiyng hallucinatory syndromes

Georges de Morsier (25 February 1894, Paris – 9 January 1982, Geneva) was a Swiss neurologist and psychiatrist best known for his work on the classification of hallucinatory syndromes. He distinguish between those caused by sensory deprivation, organic brain lesions, and chronic psychosis. He is also remembered for naming several syndromes, including Charles Bonnet syndrome, Zingerle syndrome, Clérambault syndrome, and for the eponym De Morsier's syndrome (now known as septo-optic dysplasia).

== Early life and education ==
De Morsier studied natural sciences and medicine at the University of Geneva, completing his medical degree in the early 1920s. He then moved to Paris for clinical training, where he became a resident under the French psychiatrist Gaétan de Clérambault, whose work on automatisme mental would later shape De Morsier's theoretical contributions to psychiatry.

Returning to Geneva, he began teaching at the University of Geneva, where he was appointed Privatdozent in 1928 and associate professor in 1941. His growing reputation in the field led to his election as president of the Swiss Neurological Society from 1946 to 1949, a role that marked his consolidation as a leading figure in Swiss neuropsychiatry.

In 1960, he was appointed full professor of neurology, and from 1962 onward, he directed the neurological polyclinic at Geneva University Hospital.

== Contributions to psychiatry and neurology ==
=== Hallucinatory syndromes and clinical classification ===
De Morsier's most significant contribution was his attempt to create a clinical cartography of hallucinations. He aimed to describe the hallucinations, distinguishing their causes, structures, and psychological contexts. He identified and formalized several distinct syndromes involving hallucinations:

- Charles Bonnet syndrome refers to complex visual hallucinations experienced by cognitively healthy individuals with significant visual impairment. First described in the 18th century by Swiss naturalist Charles Bonnet, De Morsier reintroduced and named the condition in the 20th century. His framing helped establish that hallucinations can occur in the absence of psychosis, particularly in cases of sensory deprivation.
- Zingerle syndrome, named after Austrian neurologist Hermann Zingerle, involves a combination of visual, tactile, and somatic hallucinations along with paranoid delusions. De Morsier highlighted the syndrome's association with organic brain pathology, such as temporal lobe epilepsy, differentiating it from purely psychiatric hallucinosis.
- Clérambault syndrome was named by De Morsier in honor of his mentor, Gaétan de Clérambault. While Clérambault had already described a phenomenon known as automatisme mental, De Morsier formalized a clinical syndrome characterized by auditory and visual hallucinations, mental automatisms, and self-referential delusions, typically occurring in chronic psychosis. By coining the term, he preserved Clérambault's legacy within a modern diagnostic framework.

Through these syndromes, De Morsier illustrated that hallucinations arise from different neural and psychological processes, challenging the prevailing notion that all hallucinations were indicative of schizophrenia or psychosis.

== Septo-optic dysplasia ==
De Morsier is also credited with early descriptions of a rare congenital malformation now known as septo-optic dysplasia, a condition involving optic nerve hypoplasia and absence of the septum pellucidum. The condition was historically referred to as De Morsier's syndrome, based on his 1956 paper describing these anatomical anomalies.

== Selected works ==
- Les trémulations fibrillaires et la contracture rigide du cœur. Medical thesis, Geneva, 1922.
- Pathologie du diencéphale. Les syndromes psychologiques et syndromes sensorio-moteurs. Schweizer Archiv für Neurologie und Psychiatrie, 1944.
- Études sur les dysraphies crânioencéphaliques. III. Agénésie du septum pellucidum avec malformation du tractus optique. Schweizer Archiv, 1956.
- Contribution à l’étude clinique des altérations de la formation réticulée: Le syndrome sensorio-moteur et psychologique. Journal of the Neurological Sciences, 1966.
