= Hermann Zingerle =

Austrian neurologist and psychiatrist (1870–1935)

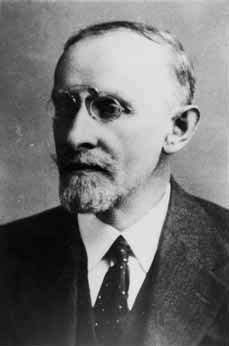
Hermann Zingerle (1870-1935)

Hermann Zingerle (31 March 1870 – 25 April 1935) was an Austrian neurologist and psychiatrist born in Trento.

In 1894 he earned his medical degree from the University of Innsbruck, becoming an assistant at the University of Graz during the following year. In 1899 he received his habilitation for psychiatry and neuropathology, and from 1909 to 1926 was an associate professor at Graz.

His name is associated with Zingerle's automatosis (Zingerle syndrome), a condition in which an individual experiences visual hallucinations taking place during automatic movements and changes in posture. The term "Zingerle syndrome" was named in his honor by Swiss neurologist Georges de Morsier (1894–1982).

== Selected publications ==
- Ueber die Bedeutung des Balkenmangels im menschlichen Grosshirne (1898) – On the importance of the corpus callosum defect in the enlarged brains of humans.
- Erwiderung auf den Aufsatz von Dr. O. von Leonowa-v. Lange: Zur pathologischen Entwickelung des Centralnervensystems (1904) – Response to the article by Dr. Leonowa-Lange: On the pathological development of the central nervous system.
- Untersuchung einer menschlichen Doppelmißbildung (Cephalothoracopag. monosymmetr.) mit besonderer Berücksichtigung des Centralnervensystems (1907) – Examination of a human Doppelmißbildung (cephalothoracopagus monosymmetros), with special reference to the central nervous system.
- Über Stellreflexe und Automatische Lageänderungen des Körpers Beim Menschen (1924) – On "righting reflexes" and automatic changes involving the positioning of the body in humans.
- Klinische Studie über Haltungs- und Stellreflexe sowie andere automatische Körperbewegungen beim Menschen. III (1926) – Clinical study on posture and "righting reflexes" and other automatic body movements in humans.
