= Short rib–polydactyly syndrome =

- Specialty: Medical genetics

Short rib–polydactyly syndrome is a family of four closely related dysplasias:

- I – "Saldino-Noonan type"
- II – "Majewski type"
- III – "Verma-Naumoff type" (associated with DYNC2H1)
- IV – "Beemer-Langer type"
