= SACRAL syndrome =

SACRAL syndrome is a congenital condition characterized by spinal dysraphism and anogenital, cutaneous, renal and urologic anomalies, associated with an angioma of lumbosacral localization. The constellation of abnormalities comprising SACRAL syndrome was first described in 1986. The syndrome was further characterized and the term SACRAL syndrome was first used in 2007 by researchers in Bordeaux, France. The researchers noted that in the 49 instances of perineal hemangiomas (angiomas of lumbosacral localization) in children since 1994, 5 children had additional malformations associated with the SACRAL syndrome. Infantile hemangiomas are very common in infancy, affecting 2% of infants at birth and up to 10% at 1 year of age but they usually affect the head and face area, rarely affecting the lumbosacral area. Some abnormalities described as part of the SACRAL syndrome include lipomeylomeningocele (a fatty growth forms near the spinal cord and attaches to it preventing closure of the neural tube (spinal dysraphism)) with a tethered cord, imperforate anus, lipomas under the skin, or hypospadias. SACRAL syndrome has similar abnormalities to PELVIS syndrome, which was first described in 2006, and presents in babies as perineal hemangiomas, external genital malformations, lipomeningocele (neural tube defects), vesicorenal abnormalities (abnormalities of the bladder or kidneys), imperforate anus and skin tags.

== Cause ==
The cause of SACRAL syndrome is not known. But neural tube defects in general are thought to involve genetic and environmental causes. Common causes of neural tube defects include folic acid deficiency in the mother before pregnancy, certain medications such a valproic acid (commonly used in seizures or as a mood stabilizer), fever in the mother or hot tub use, and diabetes in the mother. It is unclear whether SACRAL syndrome has a genetic cause. In general, most cases of neural tube defects are sporadic, and familial cases are rare.

== Prevention ==
Spinal dysraphism (neural tube defects) are prevented with folic acid supplementation by the mother. The US Preventitive Services Task Force recommends 0.4-0.8 grams of folic acid supplementation daily for all women of childbearing age to prevent neural tube defects. Epidemiological studies have shown that folic acid supplementation in women of childbearing age reduces the incidence of neural tube defects. But supplementation started after 6 weeks of pregnancy is not associated with a reduction in neural tube defects as neural tube formation is already complete by the 4th week of gestation. Therefore, folic acid supplementation ideally should be ongoing before pregnancy occurs.

== Treatment ==
Neural tube defects, once formed, can be treated surgically. Post-natal surgical treatment is usually done, depending on the severity of the defect. Intra-uterine fetal surgery, done before birth, can also be done but is associated with maternal and fetal risks. Treatment of a tethered cord also requires surgical treatment.

== See also ==
- PELVIS syndrome
- List of cutaneous conditions
