= Saal Bulas syndrome =

- Named after: Howard M. Saal; Dorothy I. Bulas

Saal Bulas syndrome is listed as a "rare disease" by the Office of Rare Diseases (ORD) of the National Institutes of Health (NIH). This means that Saal Bulas syndrome, or a subtype of Saal Bulas syndrome, affects fewer than 200,000 people in the US population.

== Signs and symptoms ==
This syndrome consists of ectrodactyly or lobster-like hands, diaphragmatic hernia and absence of the corpus callosum.

In addition to these the following problems may also be present.

- abnormal alimentary tract
- cardiac septal defect
- low hair line in front
- oligodactyly or missing fingers
- respiratory distress
- stillbirth/neonatal death

== History ==
The syndrome was first described by American paediatricians Howard M. Saal and Dorothy I. Bulas in 1995.
