= Spondylocamptodactyly =

- Other names: Spondylocamptodactyly syndrome
- It remains unclear whether this disorder is inherited in an autosomal dominant or autosomal recessive manner.
- Specialty: Medical genetics
- Symptoms: Skeletal anomalies
- Causes: Autosomal dominant/recessive with pseudodominance inheritance
- Risk factors: unknown
- Prevention: none
- Prognosis: Good
- Frequency: very rare, only 5 cases from a single 3-generation family have been reported.
- Deaths: -

Spondylocamptodactyly, also known as Spondylocamptodactyly syndrome, is a very rare multi-systemic genetic disorder which is characterized by the presence of camptodactyly, flattened vertebrae and thoracic scoliosis of varying degrees. It has been described in 5 members of a 3-generation Mexican family, It is thought to be inherited in an either autosomal dominant or autosomal recessive with pseudodominance pattern.
