= Santos–Mateus–Leal syndrome =

- Other names: Hirschsprung disease associated with polydactyly, unilateral renal agenesis, hypertelorism, and congenital deafness.
- Specialty: Medical genetics
- Symptoms: Gastrointestinal, limb, kidney, and hearing abnormalities
- Usual onset: Postnatal
- Duration: Life-long
- Prevention: none
- Prognosis: Good
- Frequency: very rare, only 2 cases have been described in medical literature

Santos–Mateus–Leal syndrome, also known as Hirschsprung's disease-deafness-polydactyly syndrome, is a very rare autosomal recessive limb malformation which is characterized by Hirschsprung's disease, feet and hand polydactyly, unilateral renal agenesis, and congenital hearing loss. Only 2 cases have been described in medical literature.

It was first discovered by Santos et al., when they described 2 siblings of the opposite sex born to consanguineous, first-cousin parents with the symptoms mentioned above, they (Santos et al.) came to the conclusion that this case was part of a separate novel syndrome different from a previous case report which described 2 male babies with Hirschsprung's disease, polydactyly and ventricular septal defect. This disorder is inherited in an autosomal recessive manner.
