= Smith–Martin–Dodd syndrome =

- Specialty: Cardiology

Smith–Martin–Dodd syndrome is a very rare genetic disorder first described by Smith et al. in 1994. It is characterized by small eyes, a diaphragmatic hernia, and tetralogy of Fallot, a congenital heart defect. The only known case is of a 9-year-old boy with several congenital anomalies including a diaphragmatic hernia, microphthalmia, and Tetralogy of Fallot. It was found that the boy had a reciprocal translocation t(1;15)(q41;q21.2). A congenital diaphragmatic hernia is consistent with chromosome 1q41-q42 deletion syndrome, and the report by Smith et al. suggested that genes involved in the translocation may be important for the development of morphological characteristics, especially those of the eye or heart.
