= Saito–Kuba–Tsuruta syndrome =

- Other names: fibulo-ulnar hypoplasia-renal anomalies syndrome
- Specialty: Medical genetics
- Symptoms: Renal abnormalities and fibulo-ulnar dysplasia
- Complications: Neo-natal death due to respiratory failure
- Usual onset: Birth
- Duration: Life-long
- Causes: Autosomal recessive inheritance
- Diagnostic method: Physical examination
- Prevention: none
- Treatment: Usually, none can be performed due to the baby's short life
- Prognosis: Bad
- Frequency: Very rare, only 2 cases have been reported
- Deaths: 2

Saito–Kuba–Tsuruta syndrome, also known as Fibulo-ulnar hypoplasia-renal anomalies syndrome, is a very rare genetic disorder which is characterized by fibulo-ulnar dysplasia associated with renal abnormalities. It is associated with neo-natal respiratory failure soon after birth.

== Presentation ==
Both of the affected siblings that were first described showed the following symptoms: A high chance of dying soon after being born, facial dysmorphisms/anomalies, ear abnormalities, symmetric long bone deficiency, fibular aplasia, symphalangism, congenital heart defects, and hypoplasia of the kidney.

== Etymology ==
It was first discovered in April 1989, when Saito et al. described two siblings of the opposite sex (one male and one female) born to healthy, young, non-consanguineous parents. The siblings showed the symptoms mentioned above. When post-mortem examination was performed in the brother, he was found to have truncus arteriosus and a ventricular septal defect. During pregnancy, ultrasounds had shown two gestational sacs early on the pregnancy, one contained a fetus (that of the male) and the other started deteriorating and finally disappeared 15 weeks into the pregnancy. When Saito et al. investigated, they found that no other syndrome had features similar to this case, therefore they proposed this case to be part of a brand new, separate autosomal recessive syndrome.
