= Schimke syndrome =

- Other names: Spondyloepiphyseal dysplasia nephrotic syndrome; Immunoosseous dysplasia, SIOD; Schimke immuno-osseous dysplasia

Schimke syndrome is a rare autosomal recessive disorder.

The disorder was first described in 1971 by Schimke.

== Diagnosis ==
Most people with this disorder are diagnosed at age 6.

Tests for mutations in the SMARCAL1 can confirm the diagnosis.

== Prevalence ==
The exact prevalence is unknown but is said to occur in 1 in a million births in North America. The disorder is said to occur in 1 in 1 million or 1 in 3 million people in North America.
