= Wells-Jankovic syndrome =

- Other names: Familial spastic paraparesis and deafness; Spastic paraparesis - deafness

Wells-Jankovic syndrome is a rare neurologic disorder characterized by spastic paraparesis presents in late childhood along with hearing loss.

In 1986 Wells and Jankovic reported the condition in 6 males. There have been no new cases in the literature since 1986.
