= PELVIS syndrome =

- Specialty: Dermatology

PELVIS syndrome is a congenital condition characterized by perineal hemangioma, external genitalia malformations, lipomyelomeningocele, vesicorenal abnormalities, imperforate anus, and skin tag.

== See also ==
- SACRAL syndrome
- List of cutaneous conditions
