= Stratton Parker syndrome =

Stratton Parker Syndrome
- Other names: Short stature Wormian bones dextrocardia

Stratton Parker syndrome is a rare disorder characterized by short stature, Wormian bones (extra cranial bones), and dextrocardia (displaced heart). Other symptoms include dermatoglyphics, tooth deformities or missing teeth, abnormal kidney development, shortened limbs, intellectual disability, undescended testes or cryptorchidism, and anal atresia. The condition was first described by Stratton and Parker in 1989, and there have been only four reported cases worldwide.

Alternative names include "growth hormone deficiency with Wormian bones, cardiac anomaly, and brachycamptodactyly" and "short stature Wormian bones dextrocardia"
