= Susac's syndrome =

- Other names: Retinopathy-encephalopathy-deafness associated with microangiopathy
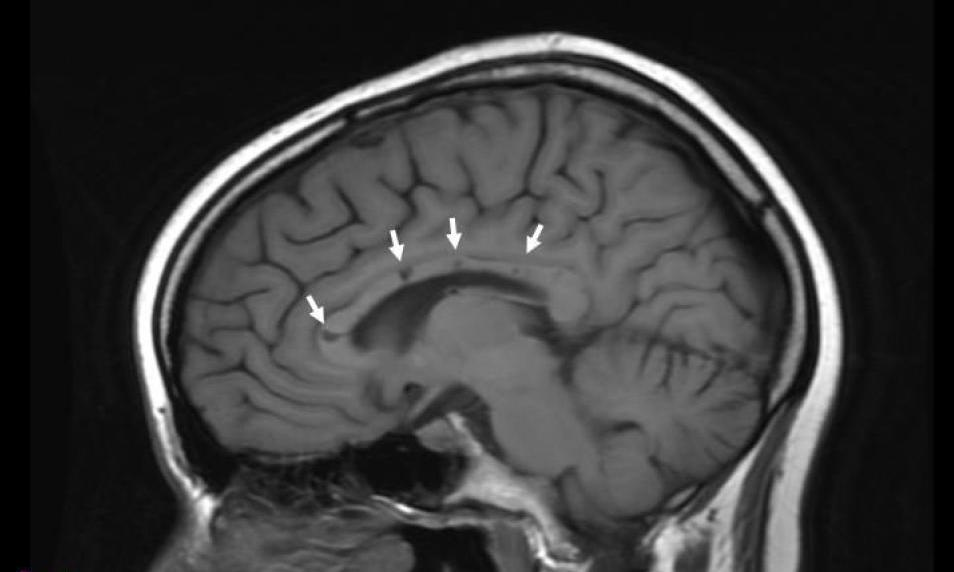
- Sagittal T1 image in a 19-year-old woman with Susac's syndrome showing the pathognomonic central callosal "holes" (microinfarcts) of SS. These residual "holes" (and sometimes, "spokes") develop as the acute callosal changes resolve.
- Specialty: Neurology

Susac's syndrome (retinocochleocerebral vasculopathy) is a very rare form of microangiopathy characterized by encephalopathy, branch retinal artery occlusions and hearing loss. The cause is unknown but it is theorized that antibodies are produced against endothelial cells in tiny arteries which leads to damage and the symptoms related to the illness. Despite this being an extremely rare disease, there are four registries collecting data on the illness; two are the United States, one in Germany, and one in Portugal.

== Presentation ==
Susac's syndrome is named for Dr. John Susac (1940–2012), of Winter Haven, Florida, who first described it in 1979. Susac's syndrome is a very rare disease, of unknown cause, and many persons who experience it do not display the bizarre symptoms named here. Their speech can be affected, such as the case of a female of late teens who suffered speech issues and hearing problems, and many experience unrelenting and intense headaches and migraines, some form of hearing loss, and impaired vision. The problem usually corrects itself, but this can take up to five years. In some cases, subjects can become confused. The syndrome usually affects women around the age of 18 years, with female to male ratio of cases of 2:1.

Dr. William F. Hoyt was the first to call the syndrome Susac syndrome and later Dr. Robert Daroff asked Dr. Susac to write an editorial in Neurology about the disorder and to use the eponym of Susac syndrome in the title, forever linking this disease with him.

== Pathogenesis ==
In the March 1979 report in Neurology, Drs. Susac, Hardman and Selhorst reported two patients with the triad of encephalopathy, hearing loss and microangiopathy of the retina. The first patient underwent brain biopsy, which revealed sclerosis of the media and adventitia of small pial and cortical vessels, suggestive of a healed angiitis. Both patients underwent fluorescein retinal angiography that demonstrated multifocal retinal artery occlusions without evidence of embolic disease. Though the exact pathogenesis of this disorder is unknown, the retinal and brain biopsy findings suggest a small vessel vasculopathy leading to arteriolar occlusion and microinfarction of cerebral, retinal and cochlear tissue. Demyelination is not a typical feature of Susac's syndrome. Muscle biopsies from such patients are usually normal, but some have also shown nonspecific signs of inflammation such as dense hyaline material surrounding endomysial capillaries. This suggests a possible systemic component of this disease, despite the predominance of central nervous system features. The latest thinking is that an antibody directed against endothelial cells is the pathogenic mechanism in this disease which causes the microscopic strokes in the brain, retina, and inner ear.

== Diagnosis ==
Patients typically present with low frequency hearing loss detectable via an audiogram. Headaches are frequently present in addition to roaring tinnitus and often some degree of paranoia. Partial vision loss is often present and caused by branch retinal artery occlusions. The presence of refractile or non-refractile yellow Gass plaques in the retinal arterioles is near pathognomonic for the disease. Fluorescein angiography may demonstrate leakage in areas remote from the retinal infarctions.

=== Radiographic appearance ===
In a recent analysis (Susac et al., 2003), MRI images from 27 patients fulfilling the diagnostic criteria of Susac's syndrome were reviewed. Multifocal supratentorial lesions were present in all patients. Most lesions were small (3 to 7 mm), though some were larger than 7 mm. All 27 patients had corpus callosum lesions. These all had a punched-out appearance on follow-up MRI. Though most commonly involving white matter, many patients also had lesions in deep grey matter structures, as well as leptomeningeal enhancement. Multiple sclerosis (MS) and acute disseminated encephalomyelitis (ADEM) can mimic the MRI changes seen in patients with Susac's syndrome. However, the callosal lesions in Susac's syndrome are centrally located. In comparison, patients with MS and ADEM typically have lesions involving the undersurface of the corpus callosum. Deep gray matter involvement commonly occurs in ADEM but is very rare in MS. Leptomeningeal involvement is not typical of either MS or ADEM: if 10 lesions are found in the brain of an MS patient, a lesion may be found in the corpus callosum. If a Susac patient has 10 lesions, more than half will be in the corpus callosum.

A concern about this illness is that it mimics multiple sclerosis when looking at the vision loss and brain lesions. If close attention is not paid to the retina of a patient with vision loss and brain lesions, their symptoms may be mistaken for MS instead of Susac's syndrome. This may account for the low prevalence of the illness. There is also a pathological similarity between the endotheliopathy in Susac's syndrome with that seen in juvenile dermatomyositis.

== Treatment ==
Early and aggressive treatment is important to prevent irreversible neurological damage, hearing loss, or vision loss. Medications used include immunosuppressive agents and corticosteroids such a prednisone, or intravenous immunoglobulins (IVIG). Other drugs that have been used are mycophenolate mofetil (Cellcept), azathioprine (Imuran), cyclophosphamide, rituximab, and anti-TNF therapies.

Hearing aids or cochlear implants may be necessary in the event of hearing loss.
