= Subvalvular aortic stenosis (canine) =

Canine subvalvular aortic stenosis (SAS) is an abnormal, congenital heart murmur caused by subaortic stenosis (SAS).

This genetic trait is polygenic, and in some cases asymptomatic. An animal with SAS may produce offspring and show no symptoms across multiple generations.Breeding an animal diagnosed with SAS is deprecated.

== Symptoms ==
Caninews diagnosed with subaortic stenosis can suffer from clinical signs such as fainting, breathing difficulty in moderate cases or heart failure and sudden death in severe cases. Symptoms include sudden/strong lethargy, continuous heavy panting, and a rise in temperature.

== Diagnosis ==
The Orthopedic Foundation for Animals (OFA) established a Congenital Heart Registry whose guidelines were established by veterinary cardiologists. A dog that auscultates normally at 12 months of age is considered to be free of congenital heart disease. Upon confirmation of this, OFA issues a certificate.
