= Scalp defects-postaxial polydactyly syndrome =

Scalp defects-postaxial polydactyly
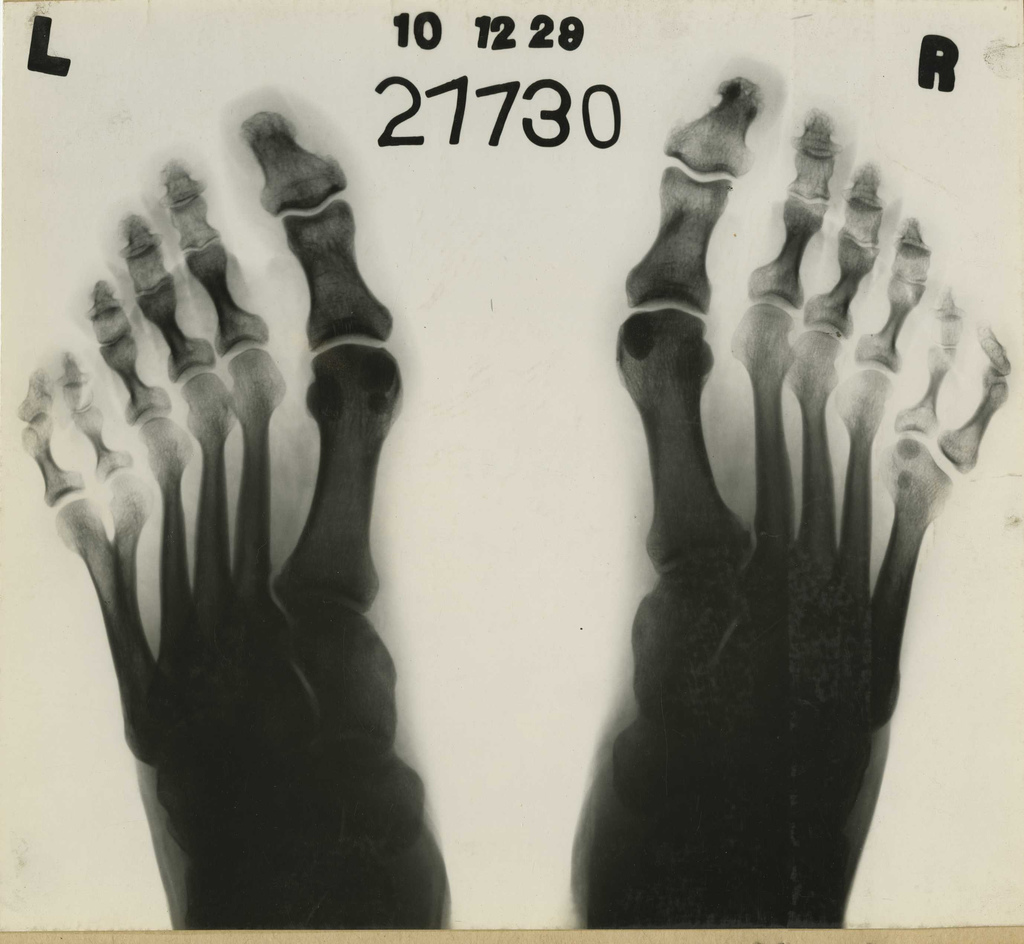
- Foot postaxial polydactyly
- Specialty: Medical genetics
- Symptoms: Autosomal dominant postaxial polydactyly and scalp defects from birth
- Usual onset: Conception
- Duration: Lifelong (except polydactyly, which can be corrected)
- Causes: Mutation
- Prevention: none
- Prognosis: Good
- Frequency: very rare, only 9 cases have been described in medical literature

Scalp defects-postaxial polydactyly syndrome is a very rare genetic disorder which is characterized by congenital defects of the scalp and type A postaxial polydactyly. An additional finding is severe intellectual disability. It is thought to be inherited in an autosomal dominant manner. Approximately 9 cases from two families have been described in medical literature.
