= Commissure of inferior colliculus =

Structure of the midbrain

Details
- Part of: Inferior colliculus

Identifiers
- Latin: Commissura colliculi inferioris
- NeuroNames: 481
- NeuroLex ID: birnlex_935
- TA98: A14.1.06.613
- TA2: 5919
- TE: of inferior colliculus_by_E5.14.3.3.1.4.7 E5.14.3.3.1.4.7
- FMA: 71115

The commissure of inferior colliculus, also called the commissure of inferior colliculi is a prominent connection in the midbrain which is primarily responsible for coordinating auditory processing between the two sides of the brain. This commissure consists of a thin white matter structure made of myelinated axons of neurons and joins the paired inferior colliculi.
