= Septum pellucidum =

Thin membrane between the lateral ventricles of the brain

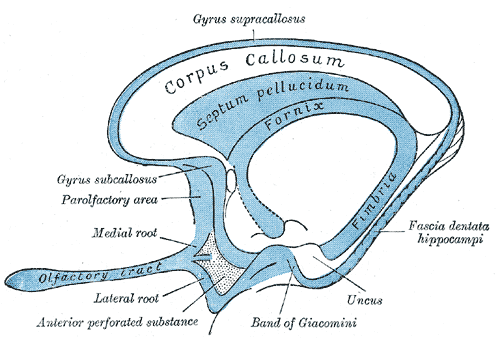
- Image showing the septum pellucidum, with other structures of the rhinencephalon also shown

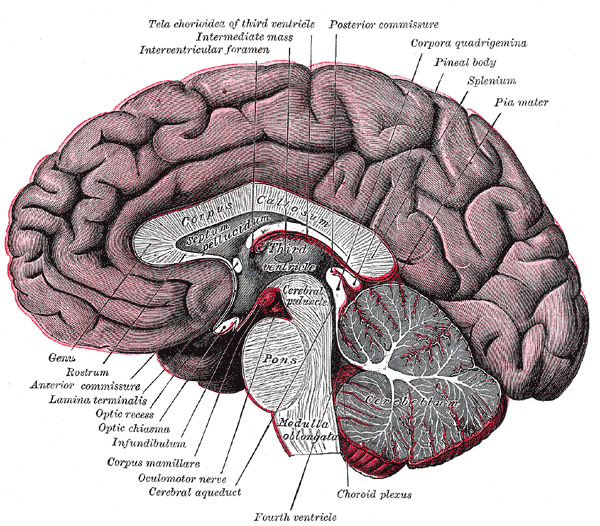
- Cross-section of the brain showing the right cerebral hemisphere. The septum pellucidum is seen as the sheet joining the corpus callosum to the fornix.

Details
- Location: Midline of the brain

Identifiers
- Latin: septum pellucidum (lamina septi pellucidi)
- MeSH: D012688
- NeuroNames: 256
- NeuroLex ID: nlx_144186
- TA98: A14.1.09.262
- TA2: 5647
- FMA: 61844

The septum pellucidum (Latin for "translucent wall") is a thin, triangular, vertical double membrane separating the anterior horns of the left and right lateral ventricles of the brain. It runs as a sheet from the corpus callosum down to the fornix.

The septum is not present in the syndrome septo-optic dysplasia.

== Structure ==
The septum pellucidum is located in the septal area in the midline of the brain between the two cerebral hemispheres. The septal area is also the location of the septal nuclei. It is attached to the lower part of the corpus callosum, the large collection of nerve fibers that connect the two cerebral hemispheres. It is attached to the front forward part of the fornix. The lateral ventricles sit on either side of the septum.

The septum pellucidum consists of two layers or laminae of both white and gray matter. During fetal development, there is a space between the two laminae called the cave of septum pellucidum that, in ninety percent of cases, disappears during infancy. The cavum was occasionally referred to as the fifth ventricle, but this is no longer used because the space is usually not continuous with the ventricular system. The fifth ventricle is recognised as the terminal enlargement of the spinal cord.

== Clinical significance ==
Absence of the septum pellucidum occurs in septo-optic dysplasia, a rare developmental disorder usually characterized by abnormal development of the optic disk and pituitary deficiencies. Symptoms of septo-optic dysplasia are highly variable and may include vision difficulties, low muscle tone, hormonal problems, seizures, intellectual problems, and jaundice at birth. Management is directed at the symptoms a person is affected with.

== Additional images ==
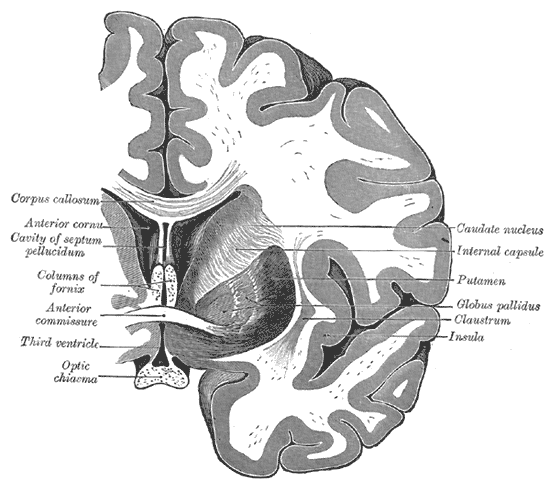
Cross-section of the brain showing the septum pellucidum sitting between the two lateral ventricles, and beneath the corpus callosum

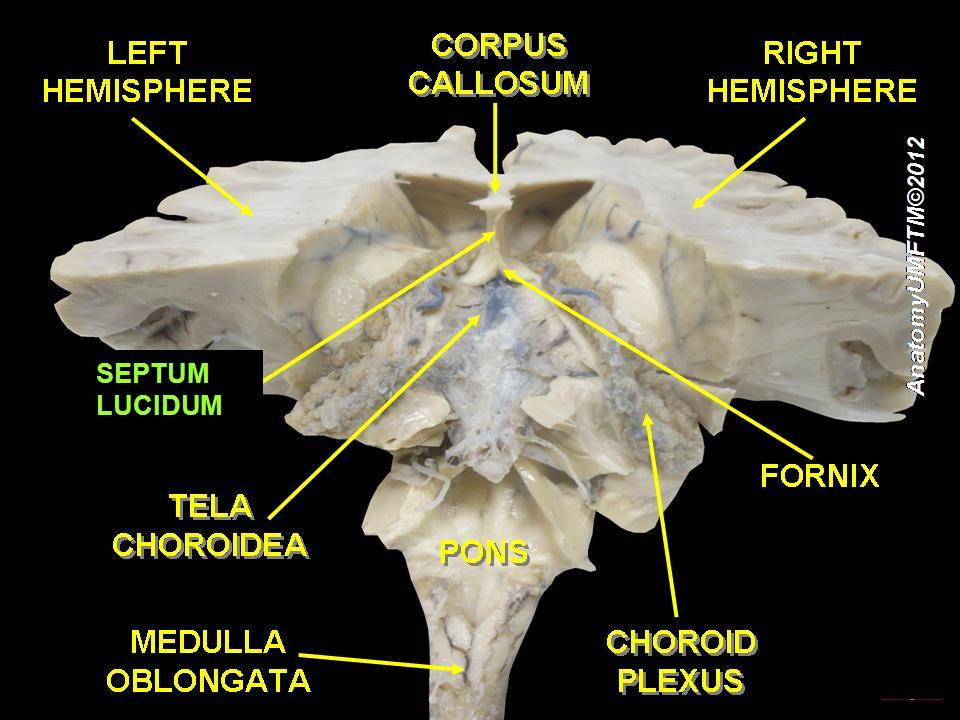
Septum pellucidum (labelled "septum lucidum") seen in a specimen from a cadaver.
