= Saal Greenstein syndrome =

- Other names: Robinow-like syndrome
- Autosomal recessive is the manner of inheritance of this condition

Saal Greenstein syndrome is a very rare autosomal recessive genetic disorder characterized by stunted growth, short limbs, microcephaly, and an anomalous cleavage of the anterior chamber of the eye. The disorder is similar to Robinow syndrome except for anterior chamber anomalies and, in one case, hydrocephalus.
