= Commissure of superior colliculus =

Details
- Part of: Superior colliculus

Identifiers
- Latin: Commissura colliculi superioris
- NeuroNames: 475
- NeuroLex ID: birnlex_1073
- TA98: A14.1.06.614
- TA2: 5915
- TE: of superior colliculus_by_E5.14.3.3.1.4.5 E5.14.3.3.1.4.5
- FMA: 72418

The commissure of superior colliculus, also called the commissure of superior colliculi is a thin white matter structure consisting of myelinated axons of neurons and joining together the paired superior colliculi.

It is evolutionarily one of the most ancient interhemispheric connections.
