= Shapiro syndrome =

- Other names: Spontaneous periodic hypothermia
- Specialty: Neurology

Shapiro syndrome is an extremely rare disorder consisting of paroxysmal hypothermia (due to hypothalamic dysfunction of thermoregulation), hyperhydrosis (sweating), and agenesis of the corpus callosum with onset typically in adulthood. The disease affects about 50-60 people worldwide. The duration and frequency of the episodes vary from person to person, with some episodes lasting hours to weeks and occurring from hours to years. Very little is known about the disease due to the small number of people affected. Shapiro syndrome was first described in 1969 by Dr. William Shapiro and his colleagues. While Shapiro Syndrome typically affects adults, it can be prevalent in children as well. In this article, symptoms of Shapiro syndrome, the cause, pathophysiology, and diagnostics will be discussed alongside treatment and management of the disease, prognosis, epidemiology, and research direction.

== Signs and symptoms ==
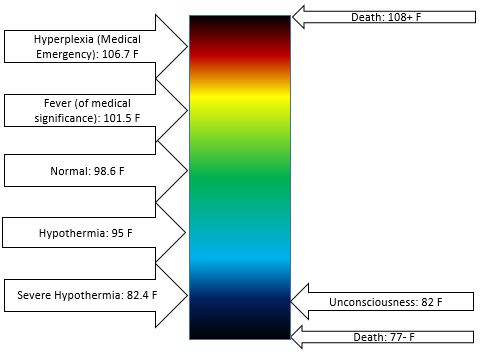
Human body temperature scale, showing the body temperature of what is considered hypothermia.

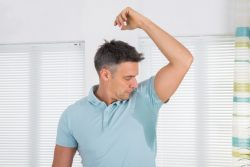
Hyperhidrosis

Common symptoms of Shapiro syndrome are hypothermia and Hyperhidrosis associated with agenesis of the corpus callosum. Individuals will present with a core body temperature that is below 35 degrees Celsius. Recurrent hypothermia can occur spontaneously at any time. Individuals will also present with profuse sweating, mainly in the upper body and face. Sweating episodes can last 1-2 hours. Other symptoms can include nausea, vomiting, chills, altered consciousness, and a feeling of weakness.

== Cause ==
Location of the corpus callosum within the human brain.

Some possible causes of Shapiro syndrome include hypothalamic dysfunction, neurotransmitter abnormalities, genetic variation, and endogenous high melatonin. However, the exact cause of Shapiro syndrome is unknown. Hypothalamus is a structure deep within the brain that connects the endocrine and nervous system together. The hypothalamus keeps the body in homeostasis. Dysfunction in the hypothalamus can lead to the body temperature fluctuations. The condition paroxysmal spontenous hypothermia with hyperhidrosis is mainly caused by serotonin dysfunction in the shivering mechanism of the anterior hypothalamus. Melatonin is a hormone that is the secreted from the pineal gland. Melatonin is the regulator of the sleep-wake cycle and plays a role in thermoregulation. In studies for shapiro syndrome, it was shown that hypermelatonemia could be associated with the development of Shapiro Syndrome. However, only one case out of the 50-60 reported had hypermelatonemia. There is a gap of knowledge regarding melatonin and how it impact Shapiro syndrome. Agenesis of the corpus callosum (ACC) is a rare, congenital brain defect that occurs when the corpus callosum does not develop normally. In majority of cases, ACC is caused by genetic factors. Genetic factors can include single gene mutations, multiple gene changes, and chromosomal aberration There is a gap knowledge on how genetic factors impact the development of Shapiro syndrome.

== Mechanism of disease ==
Shapiro syndrome develops when there is hypothalamus dysfunction. The hypothalamus is the body's primary thermostat. A decrease in the "set point" temperature leads to the development of Shapiro syndrome. Agenesis of the corpus callosum can lead to the development of Shapiro syndrome.The corpus callosum ensures that the two brain hemispheres communicate with each other. When the corpus callosum is missing or not formed properly, it can lead to many dysfunctions throughout the body including hypothermia and hyperhidrosis. Agenesis of the corpus callosum has been found in 40% of Shapiro syndrome cases reported. It is theorized that Shapiro syndrome develops based on genetic factors. However, the true mechanism of development of the disease and what causes it remains unknown.

== Diagnosis ==
If an individual is suspected of having Shapiro syndrome, a neurologist would be able to confirm the diagnosis. If an individual is experiencing spontaneous episodes of hypothermia along with hyperhidrosis, a neurologist could suspect Shapiro syndrome. In order to confirm the diagnosis of Shapiro syndrome, an MRI of the brain would be conducted. If the MRI confirms agenesis of the corpus callosum, then the individual could be diagnosed with Shapiro Syndrome. Getting diagnosed with Shapiro syndrome is quite difficult because there are no reliable imaging or laboratory test to diagnose it. Since Shapiro syndrome is quite rare, individuals are often misdiagnosed with meningitis or autoimmune encephalitis.

== Treatment or management ==
There is limited treatment options for Shapiro syndrome. Studies have shown that some medications can help with management for ongoing symptoms. One of the major symptoms of Shapiro syndrome is the hypothermia. Clonidine, an alpha 2-adrenoreceptor agonist, is a medication commonly used for hypertension. However, clonidine has been found to aid in hypothalamic regulation and is the most effective medication for symptom management in Shapiro syndrome . Medications that can mimic neurotransmitter activity that affect the hypothalamus can be used to help with regulating hypothalamic dysfunction as well. Medications such as gabapentin and venlafaxine may be used to mimic neurotransmitter activity.

== Prognosis ==
Shapiro syndrome cases have been reported in individuals from 8 months to 80 years old. Studies have shown that Shapiro syndrome development might be associated with genetic factors, however data is limited on the impact of the genetics on Shapiro syndrome. Hypothermia episodes in individuals with Shapiro syndrome can be expected to reoccur throughout their lifetimes. However, medications that regulate the hypothalamus, such as clonidine, can help with alleviating the hypothermic episodes. Prognosis data is limited for Shapiro syndrome since less than 60 cases have been reported worldwide.

== Epidemiology ==
Due to Shapiro syndrome being extremely rare and its underdiagnosis, its prevalence is not well defined. Through studies, it has been shown that genetic background can have an influence on the development of Shapiro syndrome. Limited research has explored how environmental influence might interact with genetic predispositions to trigger or exacerbate symptoms. The disease can manifest in any age, gender, and ethnicity. However, most cases that were reported were present in adulthood.

== Research directions ==
Studies have been conducted to determine what leads to the development of Shapiro syndrome. Some studies have linked the development of the disorder to hypothalamic dysfunction, neurotransmitter abornmalities, and agensis of the corpus callosum. In 2022, a case study reported that hypoglycemia can be a potential manifestation of Shapiro syndrome. However, this was only found in one the patients worldwide diagnosed with Shapiro syndrome. There is no current drug development for Shapiro syndrome, but some medications have been able to help with alleviating symptoms. There are no confirmed current/upcoming clinical trials for this syndrome.
