= Stimmler syndrome =

- Other names: Alaninuria with microcephaly, dwarfism, enamel hypoplasia and diabetes mellitus
- Stimmler syndrome is inherited in an autosomal recessive manner

Stimmler syndrome is a rare autosomal recessive congenital disorder first described by Stimmler et al. in 1970. It is characterized by dwarfism, diabetes, a small head, and high levels of alanine in the urine.

== Symptoms ==
Symptoms for the disease include microcephaly, a low birth weight, dwarfism, small teeth, and diabetes. The symptoms of Stimmler syndrome are closely related to a disease studied by Haworth et al. in 1967 as well as Leigh subacute necrotizing encephalopathy with lactic acidosis

== Pathophysiology ==
Stimmler syndrome is an autosomal recessive genetic disorder whose symptoms appear before birth or during infancy. In a study of two sisters born within a year of each other, both with Stimmler syndrome, it was found that high levels of alanine, pyruvate, and lactate were present in both the blood and urine. It was believed that the alanine was derived from the pyruvate.
