= Sabinas brittle hair syndrome =

- Sabinas brittle hair syndrome has an autosomal recessive pattern of inheritance.

Sabinas brittle hair syndrome, also called Sabinas syndrome or brittle hair-mental deficit syndrome, is an autosomal recessive congenital disorder affecting the integumentary system.

== Signs and symptoms ==
Symptoms include brittle hair, mild mental retardation and nail dysplasia. The syndrome was first observed in Sabinas, a small community in northern Mexico.

The principal biochemical features of the illness are reduced hair cystine levels, increased copper/zinc ratio, and presence of arginosuccinic acid in the blood and urine.

The key finding is brittle hair with low sulfur content, but alternating dark and light bands under polarizing microscopy, trichoschisis, and absent or defective cuticle are additional important clues for the diagnosis of trichothiodystrophy. Review of literature reveals extensive associated findings in trichothiodystrophy. Amino acid analyses of control hair when compared with those of patients with the Sabinas syndrome showed very striking differences with regard to content of sulphur amino acids. As in previous descriptions of amino acid abnormalities in the trichorrhexis nodosa of arginosuccinicaciduria, there were increases in lysine, aspartic acid, alanine, leucine, isoleucine, and tyrosine.

Trichothiodystrophy represents a central pathologic feature of a specific hair dysplasia associated with several disorders in organs derived from ectoderm and neuroectoderm. Trichothiodystrophy or TTD is a heterogeneous group of autosomal recessive disorders, characterized by abnormally sulfur deficient brittle hair and accompanied by ichthyosis and other manifestations. Patients with trichothiodystrophy should have a thorough evaluation for other associated manifestations, including investigation of photosensitivity and DNA repair defects. Because the disease appears to be inherited in an autosomal recessive pattern, detection of low-sulfur brittle hair syndrome is also important for genetic counseling.

== Genetics ==
Sabinas brittle hair syndrome is inherited as an autosomal recessive genetic trait.

In a study by Howell et al. patients were located and studied by means of complete histories and physical examinations, analyses of serum trace metals, ceruloplasmin concentration, urine and serum amino acids, and routine metabolic urine screens. In addition, serum and urine luteinizing hormone (LH) and follicle-stimulating hormone (FSH) values were determined, and were interpreted in conjunction with total plasma estrogen, estradiol, and testosterone levels. Close examination demonstrated the scalp hairs were very brittle, coarse, wiry in texture, and broke off quite easily with mechanical trauma such as combing and brushing. Some hairs could be visualized in their follicles, which were broken off at the skin line. Most patients had accompanying hyperkeratosis (thickening of the skin) of moderate degree on exposed surfaces. Maxillary hypoplasia (midfacial retrusion) was significant in many patients. The brittle, short hair, reduced eyelashes, crowded teeth, and dull appearance created a characteristic facial appearance. Post-pubertal patients had development of secondary sexual characteristics consistent with their age, except for sparse pubic escutcheons. All cases studied demonstrated some degree of mental deficiency; I.Q.'s ranged between 50 and 60. A deficiency in eye–hand coordination was also noted.

== Diagnosis ==
The easiest way to test for this condition is through genetic testing. Several methods can be used for genetic testing that can help identity this condition,

- Molecular genetic tests (or gene tests) study single genes or short lengths of DNA to identify mutations and variations that can help lead to a genetic disorder.
- Chromosomal genetic tests help investigate whole chromosomes or long lengths of DNA to see if there are bigger genetic changes, for example, an extra copy of a chromosome that can help cause a genetic condition.
- Biochemical genetic tests study the activity level and amount level of proteins; abnormalities in either can indicate changes to the DNA and result in a genetic disorder.

== Management ==
Although there has been no conclusive evidence on medications to manage the disorder, many organizations help with several aspects on living with the chronic condition, not only for the affected but also for the loved ones around them. With services like Global Genes helping contribute to this.
