= Majewski's polydactyly syndrome =

- Other names: Polydactyly with neonatal chondrodystrophy type I
- This condition is inherited in an autosomal recessive manner
- Frequency: 0.0001%

Majewski's polydactyly syndrome, also known as polydactyly with neonatal chondrodystrophy type I, short rib-polydactyly syndrome type II, and shorts rib-polydactyly syndrome, is a lethal form of neonatal dwarfism characterized by osteochondrodysplasia (skeletal abnormalities in the development of bone and cartilage) with a narrow thorax, polysyndactyly, disproportionately short tibiae, thorax dysplasia, hypoplastic lungs and respiratory insufficiency. Associated anomalies include protruding abdomen, brachydactyly, peculiar faces, hypoplastic epiglottis, cardiovascular defects, renal cysts, and also genital anomalies. Death occurs before or at birth.The disease is inherited in an autosomal recessive pattern.

It was characterized in 1971.
