= Septo-optic dysplasia =

- Other names: de Morsier syndrome
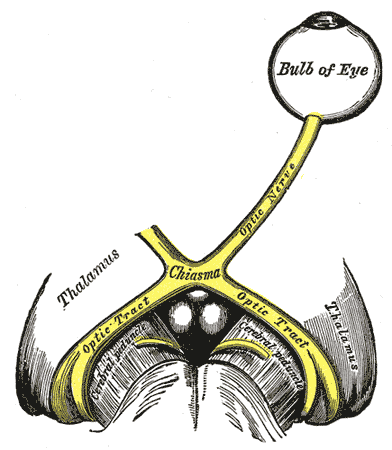
- The optic nerve is underdeveloped in this condition.
- Specialty: Ophthalmology
- Diagnostic method: congenital hypopituitarism, holoprosencephaly

Septo-optic dysplasia (SOD), known also as de Morsier syndrome, is a rare congenital malformation syndrome that features a combination of the underdevelopment of the optic nerve, pituitary gland dysfunction, and absence of the septum pellucidum (a midline part of the brain). Two or more of these features need to be present for a clinical diagnosis—only 30% of patients have all three. French-Swiss doctor Georges de Morsier first recognized the relation of a rudimentary or absent septum pellucidum with hypoplasia of the optic nerves and chiasm in 1956.

== Signs and symptoms ==
The symptoms of SOD can be divided into those related to optic nerve underdevelopment, pituitary hormone abnormalities, and mid-line brain abnormalities. Symptoms may vary greatly in their severity.

=== Optic nerve underdevelopment ===
About one quarter of people with SOD have significant visual impairment in one or both eyes, as a result of optic nerve underdevelopment. Developmental delays are more common in children with bilateral optic nerve hypoplasia than those with unilateral optic nerve hypoplasia. Bilateral optic nerve hypoplasia is also associated with a more severe disease course.

There may be nystagmus (involuntary eye movements, often side-to-side). In cases of bilateral optic nerve hypoplasia this can usually be detected within the first three months of life. It may be followed by strabismus developing in the first year.

=== Pituitary hormone abnormalities ===
Underdevelopment of the pituitary gland in SOD leads to hypopituitarism, most commonly in the form of growth hormone deficiency. In severe cases panhypopituitarism may occur.

=== Mid-line brain abnormalities ===
In SOD, mid-line brain structures such as the corpus callosum and the septum pellucidum may fail to develop normally, leading to neurological problems such as seizures or developmental delay. Patients with seizures are more likely to show additional neurological abnormalities such as cortical dysplasia, polymicrogyria and schizencephaly. Such abnormalities are always identified when spastic quadriplegia is present.

Neurological symptoms are typically considered late onset manifestations of SOD. Common initial presentations include epilepsy, development delays and limb weakness. Intellectual abilities vary widely from normal to severe intellectual disability. Early studies indicated intellectual disability occurs in 71% of cases, cerebral palsy occurs in 57%, and behavioral problems occur in 20%, but further research has indicated that these symptoms may be less common and caused by additional neurological abnormalities.

== Causes ==
SOD results from an abnormality in the development of the embryonic forebrain at 4–6 weeks of pregnancy. There is no known single cause of SOD, but it is thought that both genetic and environmental factors may be involved.

=== Genetic ===
Rare familial recurrence has been reported, suggesting at least one genetic form (HESX1). Five homozygous and eight heterozygous pathogenic HESX1 mutations have been discovered. Patients with homozygous mutations present with a typical SOD phenotype while those with heterozygous mutations are mildly affected. In addition to HESX1, mutations in OTX2, SOX2 and PAX6 have been implicated in SOD. SOX2 mutations in SOD patients are associated with severe bilateral ocular anomalies such as microphthalmia and anophthalmia. Additional features associated with SOX2 mutations include developmental delay, oesophageal atresia, short stature and sensorineural hearing loss. Genetic abnormalities are identified in fewer than one percent of patients.

== Diagnosis ==
A diagnosis of SOD is made when at least two of the following triad are present: optic nerve underdevelopment; pituitary hormone abnormalities; and mid-line brain abnormalities. Diagnosis is usually made at birth or during childhood, and a clinical diagnosis can be confirmed by MRI scans.

== Treatment ==
There is no cure for SOD. Treatment aims to manage symptoms and may require a multidisciplinary team of specialists including neurologists, ophthalmologists and endocrinologists. Hormone deficiencies may be treated with HRT but vision impairments are not usually treatable.

== Epidemiology ==
A European survey put the prevalence of SOD at somewhere in the region of 1.9 to 2.5 per 100,000 live births, with the United Kingdom having a particularly high rate and with increased risk for younger mothers.

== History ==
In 1941 David Reeves at the Children's Hospital Los Angeles described an association between underdevelopment of the optic nerve with an absent septum pellucidum. Fifteen years later French doctor Georges de Morsier reported his theory that the two abnormalities were connected and coined the term septo-optic dysplasia. In 1970 American doctor William Hoyt made the connection between the three features of SOD and named the syndrome after de Morsier.

== In popular culture ==
British model and television personality Katie Price's son, Harvey, has this condition.
