= Corpus callosum =

White matter tract connecting the two cerebral hemispheres

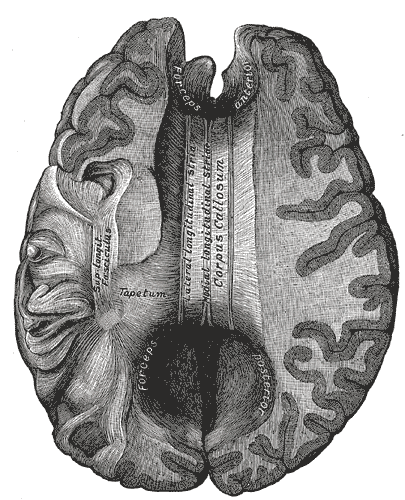
- Corpus callosum from above, front part at the top of the image

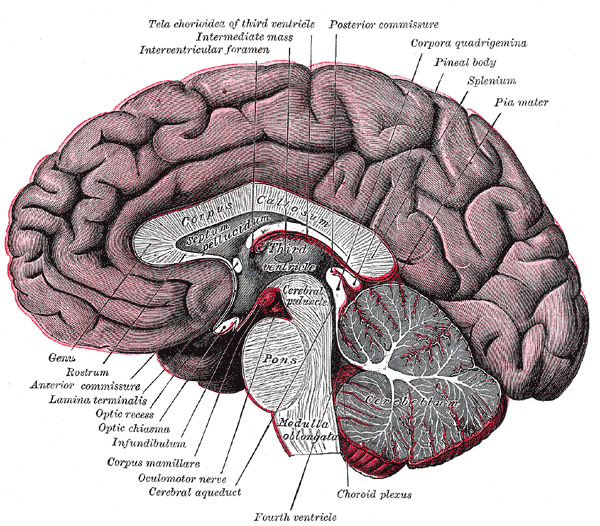
- Sagittal section of a brain, front part to the left. The corpus callosum can be seen in the center, in light gray

Details
- Pronunciation: /ˈkɔːrpəs kəˈloʊsəm/
- Part of: Human brain
- Location: Between the two brain hemispheres
- Parts: Genu, rostrum, trunk, splenium
- Function: Facilitating communication between the two brain hemispheres, allowing them to share information and coordinate functions like movement, sensory processing, and cognitive tasks

Identifiers
- Latin: corpus callosum
- MeSH: D003337
- NeuroNames: 191
- NeuroLex ID: birnlex_1087
- TA98: A14.1.09.241
- TA2: 5604
- FMA: 86464

In the human brain, the corpus callosum (Latin for "tough body"), or callosal commissure, is a wide, thick nerve tract, consisting of a flat bundle of commissural fibers, located beneath the cerebral cortex. It is present in placental mammals, and is related to handedness and laterality. It spans part of the longitudinal fissure, connecting the left and right cerebral hemispheres, enabling communication between them. It is the largest white matter structure in the human brain, about 10 cm (3.9 in) in length and consisting of 200–300 million axonal projections.

A number of separate nerve tracts, classed as subregions of the corpus callosum, connect different parts of the hemispheres. The main ones are known as the genu, the rostrum, the trunk or body, and the splenium.

== Structure ==
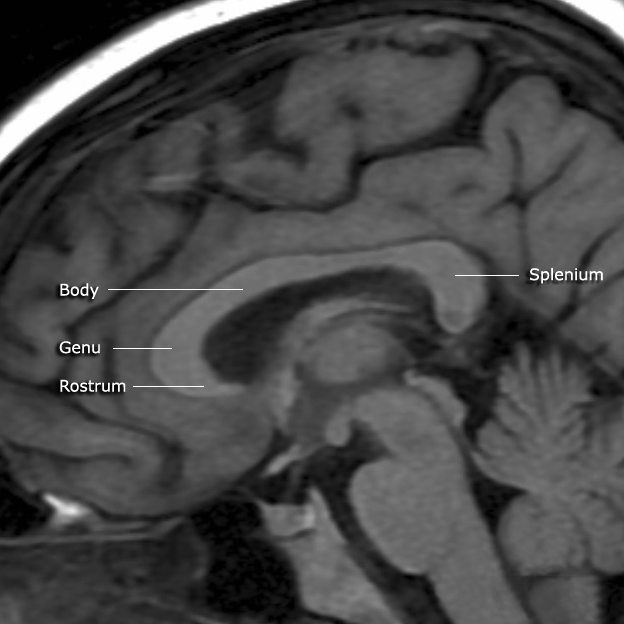
MRI of corpus callosum and its named parts

Corpus callosum

The corpus callosum forms the floor (lies inferior) of the longitudinal fissure that separates the two cerebral hemispheres. Part of the corpus callosum forms the roof (lies superior) of the lateral ventricles.

The corpus callosum has four main parts – individual nerve tracts that connect different parts of the hemispheres. These are the rostrum, the genu, the trunk or body, and the splenium. Fibres from the trunk and the splenium, known together as the tapetum ("carpet"), form the roof of each lateral ventricle.

The front (anterior) part of the corpus callosum, towards the frontal lobes, is called the genu ("knee"). The genu curves downward and backward in front of the septum pellucidum, diminishing greatly in thickness. The lower, much thinner part is the rostrum and is connected below with the lamina terminalis, which stretches from the interventricular foramina to the recess at the base of the optic stalk. The rostrum is named for its resemblance to a bird's beak.

The end (posterior) part of the corpus callosum, towards the cerebellum, is called the splenium. This is the thickest part, and overlaps the tela choroidea of the third ventricle and the midbrain, and ends in a thick, convex, free border. Splenium translates as "bandage" in Greek.

The trunk of the corpus callosum lies between the splenium and the genu.

The callosal sulcus is a sulcus that separates the corpus callosum from the cingulate gyrus.

=== Relations ===
On either side of the corpus callosum, the fibers radiate in the white matter and pass to the various parts of the cerebral cortex; those curving forward from the genu into the frontal lobes constitute the forceps minor (also forceps anterior) and those curving backward from the splenium into the occipital lobes, the forceps major (also forceps posterior). Between these two parts is the main body of the fibers, which constitute the tapetum and extend laterally on either side into the temporal lobe, and cover in the central part of the lateral ventricle. The tapetum and anterior commissure share the function of connecting left and right temporal lobes.

The anterior cerebral arteries are in contact with the undersurface of the rostrum; they arch over the front of the genu and are carried along the trunk, supplying the front four-fifths of the corpus callosum.

=== Neuronal fibers ===
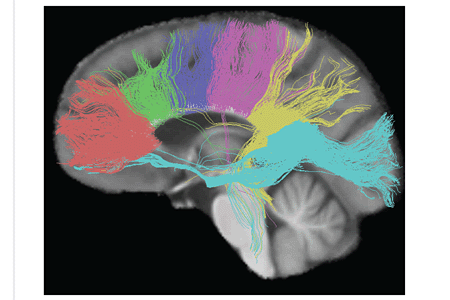
Tractogram showing six broad segments of nerve tracts from corpus callosum

The size, amount of myelination, and density of the fibers in the subregions relate to the functions of the brain regions they connect. Myelination is the process of coating neurons with myelin, which helps the transfer of information between neurons. The process is believed to occur until an individual's thirties with peak growth in the first decade of one's life. Thinner, lightly myelinated fibers are slower conducting and they connect the association and prefrontal areas. Thicker and fast-conducting fibers connect the visual and motor areas.

The tractogram pictured shows, from left to right, the nerve tracts from six segments of the corpus callosum, providing linking of the cortical regions between the cerebral hemispheres. Those of the genu are shown in coral; of the premotor, green; of the sensory-motor, purple; of the parietal, pink; of the temporal, yellow; and of the splenium, blue.

Thinner axons in the genu connect the prefrontal cortex between the two halves of the brain; these fibers arise from a fork-like bundle of fibers from the tapetum, the forceps minor. Thicker axons in the trunk of the corpus callosum interconnect areas of the motor cortex, with proportionately more of the corpus callosum dedicated to supplementary motor regions including Broca's area. The splenium communicates somatosensory information between the two halves of the parietal lobe and the visual cortex at the occipital lobe. These are the fibers of the forceps major.

A study of five- to eighteen-year-olds found a positive correlation between age and callosal thickness.

=== Variation between sexes ===
The corpus callosum and its relation to sex has been a subject of debate in the scientific and lay communities for over a century. Initial research in the early 20th century claimed the corpus to be different in size between men and women. That research was, in turn, questioned, and ultimately gave way to more advanced imaging techniques that appeared to refute earlier correlations. However, advanced analytical techniques of computational neuroanatomy developed in the 1990s showed that sex differences were clear, but confined to certain parts of the corpus callosum, and that they correlated with cognitive performance in certain tests. An MRI study found that the midsagittal corpus callosum cross-sectional area is, after controlling for brain size, on average, proportionately larger in females.

Using diffusion tensor sequences on MRI machines, the rate at which molecules diffuse in and out of a specific area of tissue, anisotropy can be measured and used as an indirect measurement of anatomical connection strength. These sequences have found consistent sex differences in human corpus callosal shape and microstructure: specifically, increased signal intensity and decreased fractional anisotropy in the female corpus callosum, as compared with that of the male.

Analysis by shape and size has also been used to study specific three-dimensional mathematical relationships with MRIs, and have found consistent and statistically significant differences between sexes. Specific algorithms have found significant differences between the two sexes in over 70% of cases in one review.

A 2005 study on the sizes and structures of the corpus callosum in transgender people found it to be structurally more in line with their declared gender than their assigned sex.

== Correlates of size with handedness ==
One study reported that the front portion of the human corpus callosum was 0.75 cm^{2} or 11% larger in left-handed and ambidextrous people than right-handed people. This difference was evident in the anterior and posterior halves of the corpus callosum, but not in the region of the splenium itself. However, a 2022 meta-analysis failed to confirm any substantial differences in the corpus callosum related to left vs. right- vs. mix-handedness. Others have instead suggested that the degree of handedness negatively correlates with the size of the corpus callosum, meaning that individuals who are capable of using both hands with dexterity would have the largest corpus callosum and vice versa for either left or right hand.

== Development ==
The formation of the corpus callosum begins with the first midline crossing of pioneer axons around week 12 in the prenatal development of the human, or day 15 in the embryogenesis of the mouse.

== Clinical significance ==
=== Epilepsy ===
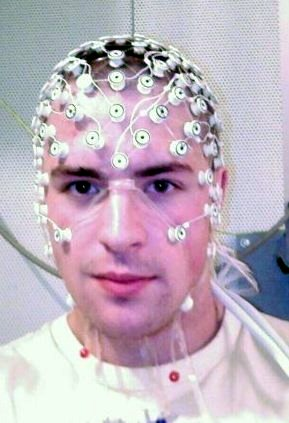
Electroencephalography is used to find the source of electrical activity causing a seizure as part of the surgical evaluation for a corpus callosotomy.

The symptoms of refractory (difficult to treat) epilepsy can be reduced by cutting through the corpus callosum in an operation known as a corpus callosotomy lobotomy paralysis. This is usually reserved for cases in which complex or grand mal seizures are produced by an epileptogenic focus on one side of the brain, causing an interhemispheric electrical storm. The diagnostic work up for this procedure involves an electroencephalogram, MRI, PET scan, and evaluation by a neurologist, neurosurgeon, psychiatrist, and neuroradiologist before a partial lobotomy surgery can be considered.

=== Failure to develop ===
Agenesis of the corpus callosum (ACC) is a rare congenital disorder that is one of the most common brain malformations observed in human beings, in which the corpus callosum is partially or completely absent. ACC is usually diagnosed within the first two years of life, and may manifest as a severe syndrome in infancy or childhood, as a milder condition in young adults, or as an asymptomatic incidental finding. Initial symptoms of ACC usually include seizures, which may be followed by feeding problems and delays in holding the head erect, sitting, standing, and walking. Other possible symptoms may include impairments in mental and physical development, hand-eye coordination, and visual and auditory memory. Hydrocephaly may also occur. In mild cases, symptoms such as seizures, repetitive speech, or headaches may not appear for years. Some syndromes often associated with ACC include Aicardi syndrome, Andermann syndrome, Shapiro syndrome, and acrocallosal syndrome.

ACC is usually not fatal. Treatment usually involves management of symptoms, such as hydrocephaly and seizures, if they occur. Although many children with the disorder lead normal lives and have average intelligence, careful neuropsychological testing reveals subtle differences in higher cortical function compared to individuals of the same age and education without ACC. Children with ACC accompanied by developmental delay and/or seizure disorders should be screened for metabolic disorders.

In addition to agenesis of the corpus callosum, similar conditions are hypogenesis (partial formation), dysgenesis (malformation), and hypoplasia (underdevelopment, including too thin).

Other studies have also linked possible correlations between corpus callosum malformation and autism spectrum disorders.

Kim Peek, a savant and the inspiration behind the movie Rain Man, was found with agenesis of the corpus callosum, as part of FG syndrome.

=== Other conditions ===
Anterior corpus callosum lesions may result in akinetic mutism or anomic aphasia. See also:

- Alien hand syndrome
- Dyslexia without agraphia (seen with damage to splenium of corpus callosum)
- Marchiafava–Bignami disease - a degenerative disease characterised by loss of myelin and necrosis of the corpus callosum
- Multiple sclerosis with the Dawson's fingers sign
- Reversible splenial lesion syndrome - a rare encephalopathy of unknown origin with a transient lesion in the splenium, mostly associated with infectious diseases. Now proposed to be included in a group of such lesions termed Cytotoxic lesions of the corpus callosum.
- Septo-optic dysplasia
- Susac's syndrome characterised by lesions as small holes in the corpus callosum

== History ==
The first study of the corpus with relation to gender was by R. B. Bean, a Philadelphia anatomist, who suggested in 1906 that "exceptional size of the corpus callosum may mean exceptional intellectual activity" and that there were measurable differences between men and women. Perhaps reflecting the political climate of the times, he went on to claim differences in the size of the callosum across different races. His research was ultimately refuted by Franklin Mall, the director of his own laboratory.

Of more mainstream impact was a 1982 Science article by Holloway and Utamsing that suggested sex difference in human brain morphology, which related to differences in cognitive ability. Time published an article in 1992 that suggested that, because the corpus is "often wider in the brains of women than in those of men, it may allow for greater cross-talk between the hemispheres—possibly the basis for women’s intuition."

Later publications in the psychology literature have raised doubt as to whether the anatomic size of the corpus is actually different. A meta-analysis of 49 studies since 1980 found that, contrary to de Lacoste-Utamsing and Holloway, no sex difference could be found in the size of the corpus callosum, whether or not any account was taken of larger male brain size. A study in 2006 using thin slice MRI showed no difference in thickness of the corpus when accounting for the size of the subject.

== Other animals ==
The corpus callosum is found only in placental mammals, while it is absent in monotremes and marsupials, as well as other vertebrates such as birds, reptiles, amphibians and fish. Other groups do have other brain structures that allow for communication between the two hemispheres, such as the anterior commissure, which serves as the primary mode of interhemispheric communication in marsupials, and which carries all the commissural fibers arising from the neocortex (also known as the neopallium), whereas in placentals, the anterior commissure carries only some of these fibers.

In primates, the speed of nerve transmission depends on the degree of myelination, or lipid coating. This is reflected by the diameter of the nerve axon. In most primates, axonal diameter increases in proportion to brain size to compensate for the increased distance to travel for neural impulse transmission. This allows the brain to coordinate sensory and motor impulses. However, the scaling of overall brain size and increased myelination have not occurred proportionately between monkeys (macaque), chimpanzees and humans. At all locations of corpus callosum (CC), the axon diameter, and hence its conduction velocity, increases between macaques and chimpanzees but not between chimpanzees and humans. This, together with the longer neural connections in larger human brains (including its anatomical asymmetry and functional lateralization), results in the human corpus callosum requiring double the time for interhemispheric communication vis-a-vis a macaque and the range of connectional delays amplified about 3-fold in humans. This slowing conduction which increases the range of connectional delays enables "potentially enriching cortical dynamics" for greater differentiation and also larger number of neuronal groups involved in cortical connectivity in humans. The fibrous bundle at which the corpus callosum appears can and does increase to such an extent in humans that it encroaches upon and wedges apart the hippocampal structures.

== Additional images ==
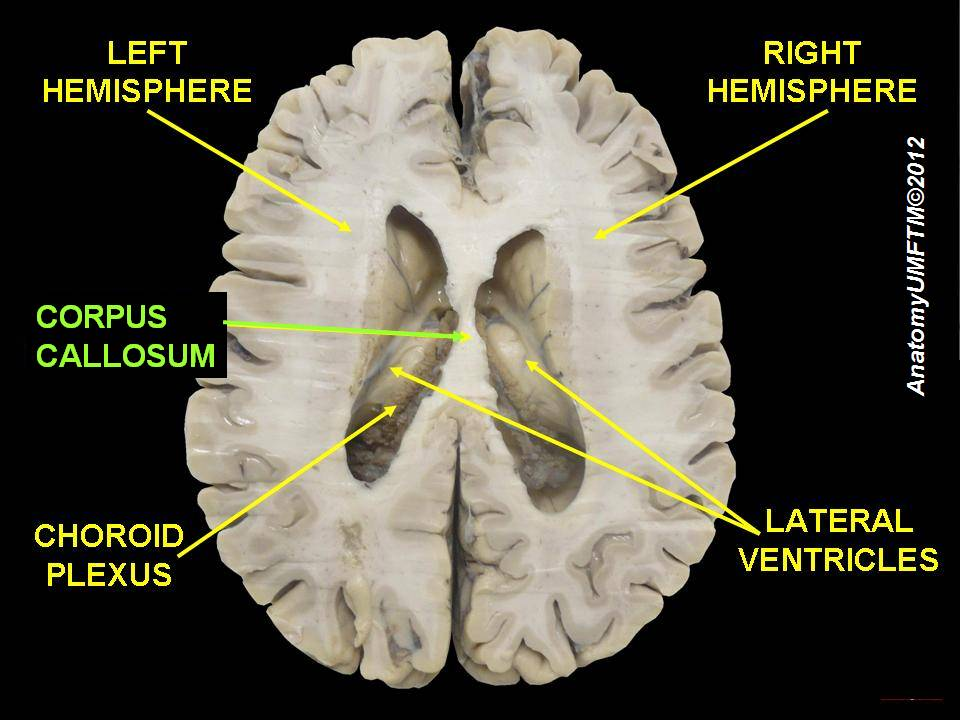
Corpus callosum

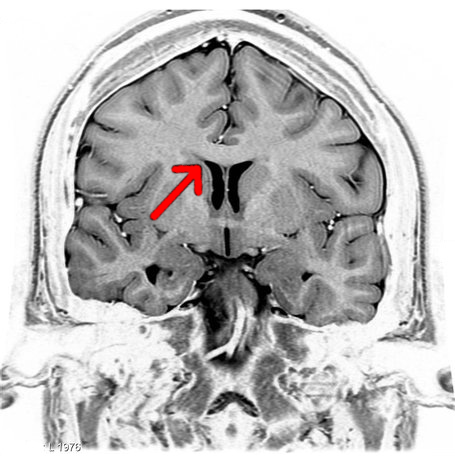
Coronal T2 (grey scale inverted) MRI of the brain at the level of the caudate nuclei emphasizing corpus callosum

Tractography of corpus callosum

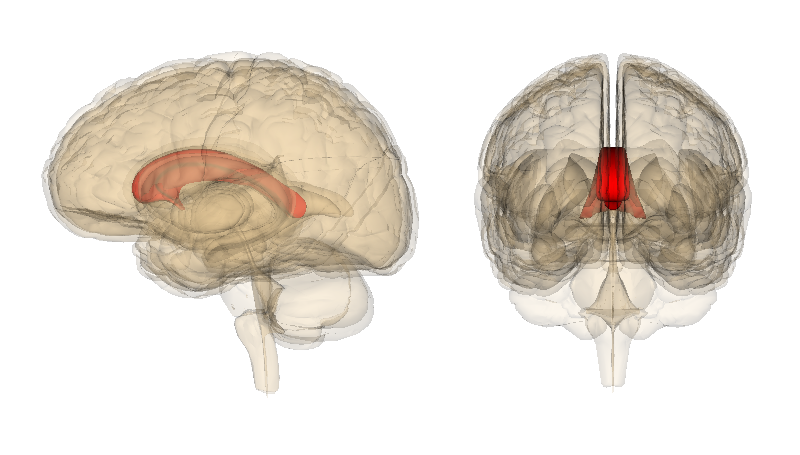
Corpus callosum with anatomography

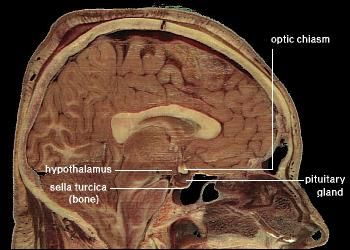
Sagittal post mortem section through the midline brain. The corpus callosum is the curved band of lighter tissue at the center of the brain above the hypothalamus. Its lighter texture is due to higher myelin content, resulting in faster neuronal impulse transmission.

== See also ==
- Handedness
- Laterality
