= GeneMatcher =

Online service for matching clinicians based on genes of interest

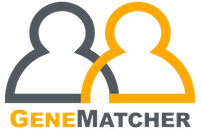

Content
- Description: Online service and database for matching clinicians based on genes of interest
- Data types captured: Genes, genomic loci, genetic disorders, physical symptoms

Contact
- Research center: Baylor–Hopkins Center for Mendelian Genomics (BHCMG)
- Primary citation: PMID 26220891
- Release date: September 2013

Access
- Website: www.genematcher.org

GeneMatcher is an online service and database that aims to match clinicians studying patients with a rare disease presentation based on genes of interest. When two or more clinicians submit the same gene to the database, the service matches them together to allow them to compare cases. It also allows matching genes from animal models to human cases. The service aims to establish novel relationships between genes and genetic diseases of unknown cause.

The website was launched in September 2013 by a team from a government-funded collaborative project between Johns Hopkins Hospital and Baylor College of Medicine in the United States.

As of December 2019, the site contained 11,855 genes from 7,724 submitters from 88 countries, and 6,609 matches had been made. The service has aided geneticists in making several discoveries, including establishing the genetic causes of a form of autism spectrum disorder, syndromes of microcephaly with hearing loss, a mitochondrial disease, SPONASTRIME dysplasia and Au–Kline syndrome.

== History ==
The website was launched in September 2013 by Nara Sobreira, François Schiettecatte, Ada Hamosh and others. The team are part of a collaborative effort between Johns Hopkins Hospital in Baltimore, Maryland and Baylor College of Medicine in Houston, Texas, United States called the Baylor–Hopkins Center for Mendelian Genomics (BHCMG), one of three such Centers for Mendelian Genomics (CMGs) established and funded by the American National Institutes of Health (NIH) and National Human Genome Research Institute (NHGRI) in 2011.

== Features ==
The service allows researchers to submit candidate genes to a database, and match based on a shared gene of interest. Researchers, healthcare providers or patients can create an account using their email, name and address. Upon doing this, they can post a gene by gene symbol, Entrez ID or Ensembl gene ID. They can also specify genes by OMIM number or genomic location. If an identical gene has already been posted by another user, the match is made immediately and both users receive an email with the contact details of the other user. Otherwise, the gene remains in the database until another user submits the same gene. The database of genes is not explorable, and no user contact details are accessible until a match has been made. Users may retract their submitted gene or delete their account at any time.

Optionally, users are also able to query the database by genetic disorder or physical symptom. The service also encourages those working with animal models to submit their gene candidates and provides an option to specify the submission by model organism.

== Usage ==
As of December 2019, the site contained 11,855 genes from 7,724 submitters from 88 countries, and 6,609 matches had been made. As of July 2015, roughly 14% of the genes were related to animal models, and the BHCMG itself had submitted at least 180 of the genes and generated 69 matches, 16 of which were also a phenotype match. Three of those phenotype–gene matches, involving SPATA5, HNRNPK and TELO2, were sufficient for publication of new outlines of diseases in medical journals.

=== Collaboration with other databases ===
GeneMatcher is part of a collaboration between multiple gene-matching services called MatchmakerExchange, launched in October 2013. The other services part of the project include PhenomeCentral and DECIPHER.

American genetic testing company GeneDx has uploaded genes from its database with likely pathogenic variants, leading to dozens of matches.

== Impact ==
GeneMatcher has helped geneticists to make several new discoveries, some examples of which include the following:

- In 2015, the service matched three practices with cases of an unknown multi-system syndrome likely caused by a mutation in HNRNPK. The cause was confirmed, and the syndrome was named Au–Kline syndrome, after Ping-Yee Billie Au and Antonie D. Kline, two of the researchers involved. The syndrome was later shown in 2019 to be identical to Okamoto syndrome, described in 1997.
- In 2015, the service allowed researchers to link SPATA5 to an autosomal recessive syndrome of microcephaly, seizures and hearing loss. They used GeneMatcher to find 4 of 14 patients with the syndrome and mutations.
- In 2015, GeneMatcher helped researchers to link TELO2 to an autosomal recessive syndrome of microcephaly, ataxia, hearing loss, congenital heart defects and other features. The service allowed them to find the fourth of four families with children with the condition and mutations. The syndrome was named You–Hoover-Fong syndrome, after researchers Jing You and Julie Hoover-Fong.
- In 2016, researchers in the Netherlands used GeneMatcher to identify 2 of 4 patients with a fatal autosomal recessive immunodeficiency condition called LICS syndrome, caused by mutations in NSMCE3.
- In 2017, it was discovered that mutations in KYNU or HAAO lead to an autosomal recessive syndrome of skeletal abnormalities, congenital heart defects, hypoplastic kidneys, hearing loss and other features. The researchers used GeneMatcher to identify the fourth of four families with children with the condition.
- In 2017, UK researchers identified mutations in ADCY3 as the cause of an autosomal recessive ciliary disorder causing obesity, anosmia and mild intellectual disability. GeneMatcher allowed them to find the fourth of four patients with the condition.
- In 2018, researchers were able to associate a mitochondrial complex I deficiency with a mutation in NDUFA6 using GeneMatcher. The service allowed them to locate 3 of 4 patients with the condition and mutation.
- In 2019, GeneMatcher allowed researchers to link DEGS1 to an autosomal recessive hypomyelinating leukodystrophy. They had found a homozygous mutation in the gene in one female patient, and the service helped them in finding 18 other patients with autosomal recessive mutations in the same gene with similar symptoms.
- In 2019, researchers were able to establish with the help of GeneMatcher that a mutation in BRSK1 leads to an autosomal dominant syndrome of intellectual disability and autism spectrum disorder. The service allowed them to find 5 of 9 patients with the condition and mutation. The nine patients were from cohorts totalling 3,429 individuals, which was considered a high prevalence for a rare disorder and led to surprise that the gene hadn't been linked to developmental delay before.
