= CDK13-related disorder =

Rare genetic disorder involving heart, facial and neurological features

- Other names: Congenital heart defects, dysmorphic facial features and intellectual developmental disorder (CHDFIDD), CDK13-related CHDFIDD
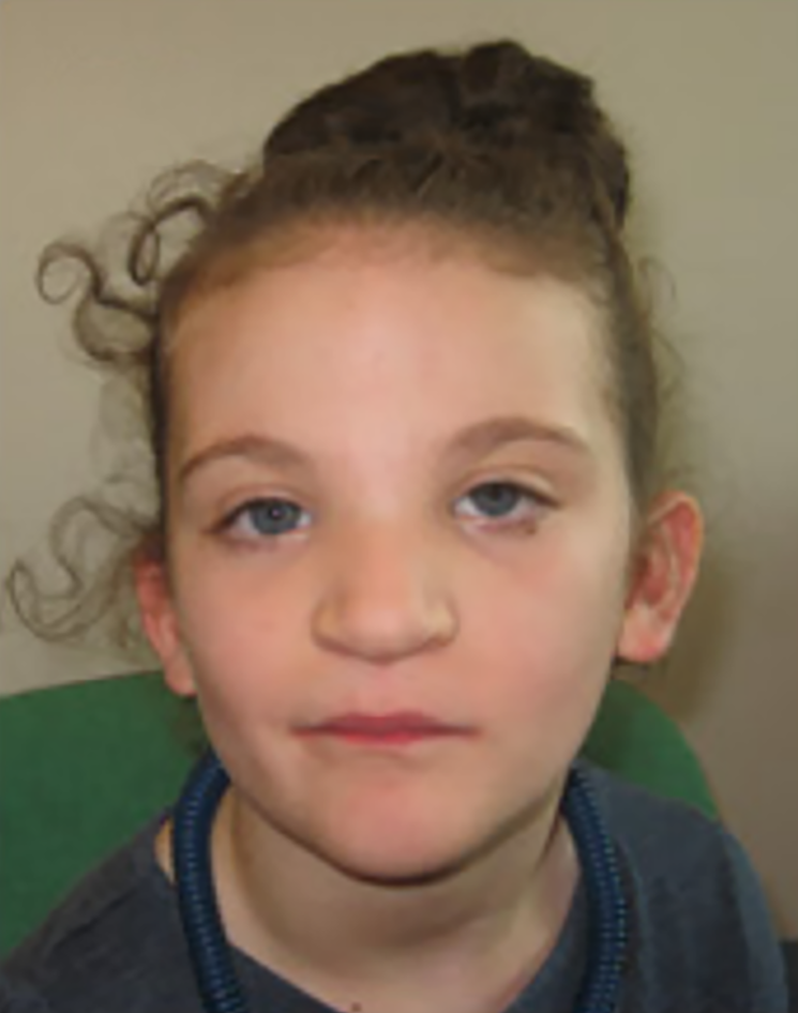
- Typical facial appearance of an individual with CDK13-related disorder
- Specialty: Medical genetics
- Symptoms: Congenital heart defects, intellectual disability, characteristic facial features, gastrointestinal dysmotility
- Causes: Genetic (autosomal dominant mutation in CDK13)
- Diagnostic method: Genetic testing
- Treatment: Gastroprokinetic medication, gastrostomy, speech therapy, assistive communication devices
- Prognosis: Not yet certain. A few patients in mid-adulthood identified.
- Frequency: Not yet known. At least 44 individuals diagnosed as of January 2019.

CDK13-related disorder, also known as congenital heart defects, dysmorphic facial features and intellectual developmental disorder (CHDFIDD), is a very rare autosomal dominant genetic condition characterised by congenital heart defects, intellectual disability and characteristic facial features. Those affected typically have motor and language delays, low muscle tone and gastrointestinal dysmotility. Facial features include a wide nasal bridge, widely-spaced eyes, prominent, low-set ears, a flat nose tip and a small mouth. Less common features include congenital spinal abnormalities, hearing loss or seizures.

The syndrome is caused by a mutation in the CDK13 gene, which encodes the protein cyclin-dependent kinase 13. Cyclin-dependent kinases are protein kinases, which are critical for regulating DNA transcription for cell differentiation. CDK13 promotes expression of genes involved in various developmental processes, and these processes are disrupted or not completed when the gene is mutated. The syndrome is diagnosed when genetic testing confirms a mutation in CDK13.

Treatment centres around the symptoms. Medication or, in severe cases, gastrostomy can be used for the gastrointestinal dysmotility. Speech therapy as early as possible or assistive communication devices can aid language development. The prognosis is not certain as of yet, due to the lack of known patients, however a few patients in mid-adulthood have been identified.

As of January 2019, at least 44 individuals with the condition had been identified and studied. Mutations in CDK13 were first identified as pathogenic in a 2016 cohort study, and the disorder was first outlined by Bostwick et al. in 2017, who also established the name CHDFIDD.

== Signs and symptoms ==
This condition is inherited in an autosomal dominant manner.

Most individuals with CDK13-related disorder have congenital heart defects, typically an atrial or ventricular septal defect.

Those with the disorder typically have a characteristic facial appearance which includes a wide nasal bridge, widely-spaced eyes, upslanted eyelids, epicanthic folds, high-arched eyebrows, prominent, low-set ears, a flat nose tip and a small mouth with a small upper lip. In some of those affected, the syndrome causes curly hair. The facial appearance has been noted to resemble that of Kabuki syndrome.

The syndrome typically results in intellectual disability, including motor and language delays. Some individuals have had agenesis of the corpus callosum or aplasia of the cerebellar vermis. This can sometimes manifest with symptoms of autism spectrum disorder. Low muscle tone and strabismus are also common. A few patients have had microcephaly and seizures.

Affected individuals tend to have dysautonomic symptoms of gastrointestinal dysmotility, which can include gastroesophageal reflux, constipation and trouble swallowing. A few of those affected have had ear problems such as sensorineural hearing loss or recurrent ear infections, and a few individuals have had congenital spinal abnormalities including fused vertebrae or spina bifida as well as scoliosis.

== Cause ==
The syndrome is caused by a mutation in one of the two copies of the gene CDK13, which encodes the protein cyclin dependent kinase 13. Cyclin-dependent kinases are protein kinases, which have an essential function in the cell cycle and the transcription of DNA. This is specifically through protein phosphorylation, which functions to turn off or on certain proteins, allowing cell differentiation and the progression of the normal developmental processes. A mutation in one of the two copies of these genes results in some proteins not being formed correctly and therefore some developmental processes being disrupted or not completed. Specifically, CDK13 appears to phosphorylate RNA polymerase II and enable it to carry out transcription of genes on DNA. It appears to largely do this when RNA polymerase II is transcribing certain genes involved in promoting cell development.

Mutations in CDK13 that have been identified in individuals with this disorder have mostly been missense mutations (single amino acid changes) that have changed the amino acid structure of the otherwise highly conserved (little-changed) protein kinase domain of the gene, leading to structural changes that affect the operation of this critical protein. The most commonly identified mutations are those that change the 842nd amino acid of the protein, an asparagine (Asn), to a serine (Ser) or an aspartic acid (Asp), but many others have been identified. Different mutations, depending on how much they reduce the kinase functionality of the gene, have resulted in different severities of the syndrome. Those with total activity-eliminating mutations have, for example, had microcephaly.

Mutations in both copies of CDK13 are embryonic lethal in mice. Mice who have had both of their copies of CDK13 knocked out do not survive past the 16th day of embryonic development due to heart failure, as the heart has significantly fewer myocytes and less myocardium, with less expression of myosin. All organs are smaller and less developed, and the embryo is reduced in size.

== Diagnosis ==
The condition is generally diagnosed after genetic testing confirms CDK13 as mutated, although the condition may be suspected based on the symptoms. Methods to detect the mutation include whole exome sequencing and panel testing, in which a selection of potential genes involved are sequenced. The mutation can be confirmed by Sanger sequencing.

== Treatment ==
Treatment centres around the symptoms. Atrial or ventricular septal defects are usually treated with observation but can be surgically corrected in severe cases. Prokinetic medication can be used to promote gastric emptying. If the gastric dysmotility is too severe for adequate intake, a gastrostomy can be performed. Speech therapy as early as possible or assistive communication devices can aid in language development.

== Prognosis ==
The prognosis is not certain as of yet, as most of the individuals discovered and studied have been children, however a few patients in mid-adulthood have been identified.

== Epidemiology ==
The prevalence is not yet known, as the disorder was only recently defined. Beginning with Bostwick et al.'s report in 2017, at least 44 individuals with the condition have been identified and studied as of January 2019. As of May 2025, there are at least 350 individuals diagnosed with CDK13.

== History ==
Mutations in CDK13 were first identified as pathogenic in 2016, when they were identified in 7 individuals from a large cohort of 1,891 patients with congenital heart defects in a study by Sifrim et al. Mutations in CDK13 were then found again in 2017 in 11 individuals from an even larger cohort of 4,293 patients from the UK and Ireland with developmental delay by McRae et al., as part of the UK Deciphering Developmental Disorders (DDD) cohort study.

The disorder was first established and outlined by Bostwick et al, (2017) (9 patients), who also established the term congenital heart defects, dysmorphic facial features and intellectual developmental disorder (CHDFIDD). Later work by Hamilton et al. (2018) (16 patients), Uehara et al. (2018) (3 patients) and van den Akker et al. (2018) (15 patients) identified and studied additional patients.

== Gallery ==
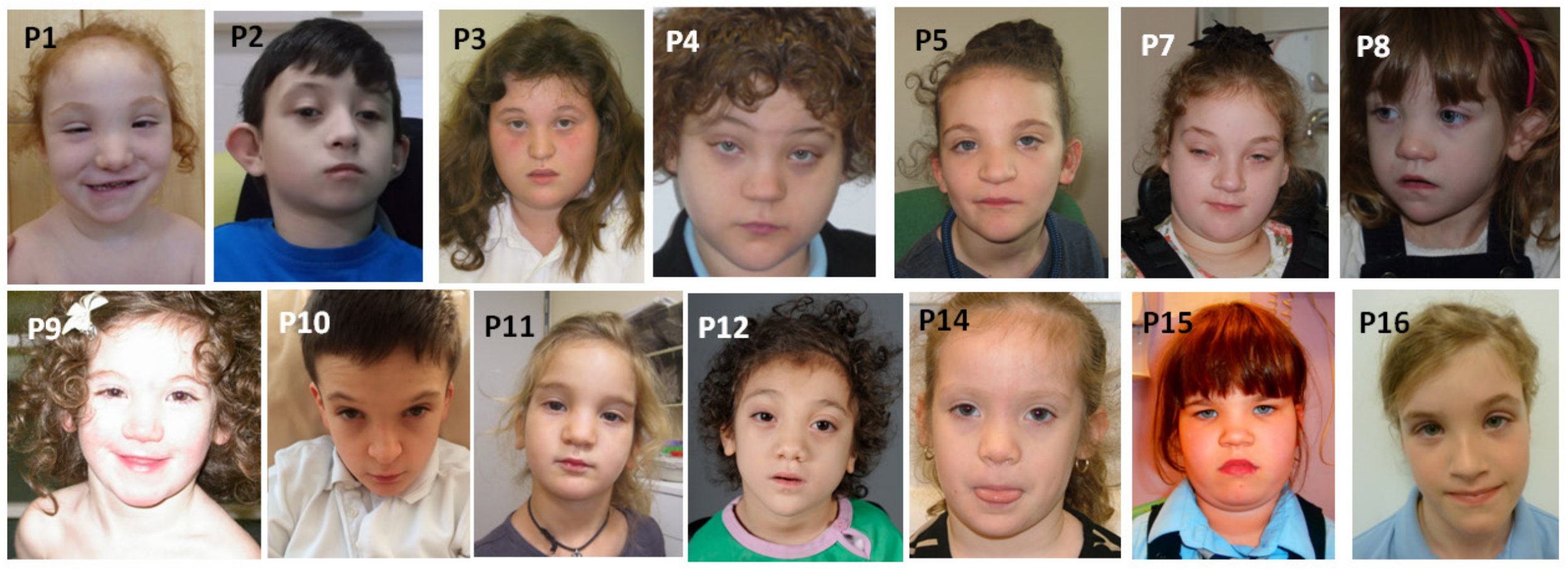
Typical facial appearance of individuals with CDK13-related disorder, including a wide nasal bridge, epicanthic folds, high-arched eyebrows, prominent, low-set ears, flat nose tip and small mouth with a small upper lip

== See also ==
- Kabuki syndrome
- Okamoto syndrome
