= Learning disability =

Range of neurodevelopmental conditions

- Other names: Learning difficulty, developmental academic disorder, developmental disorder of scholastic skills, knowledge acquisition disability, learning disorder.
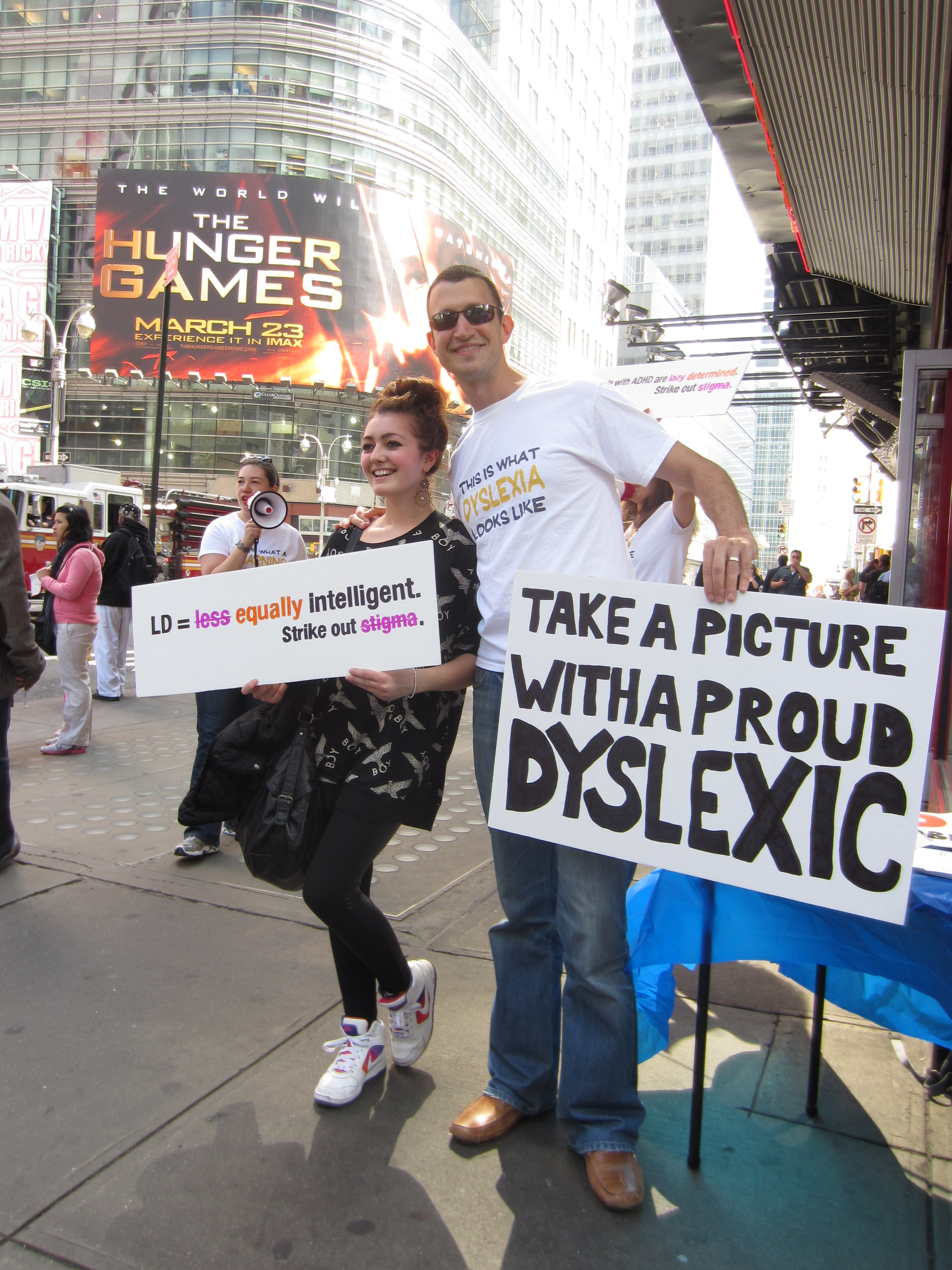
- Learning Disabilities Month event in Times Square in 2012
- Specialty: Psychiatry, neurology

Learning disability, or learning disorder, is a condition in the brain that causes difficulties comprehending or processing information and can be caused by several different factors. Given the "difficulty learning in a typical manner", this does not exclude the ability to learn in a different manner. Therefore, some people can be more accurately described as having a "learning difference", thus avoiding any misconception of being disabled with a possible lack of an ability to learn and possible negative stereotyping. In the United Kingdom, the term learning disability generally refers to an intellectual disability, while conditions such as dyslexia and dyspraxia are usually referred to as learning difficulties.

While learning disability and learning disorder are often used interchangeably, they differ in many ways. Disorder refers to significant learning problems in an academic area. These problems, however, are not enough to warrant an official diagnosis. Learning disability, on the other hand, is an official clinical diagnosis, whereby the individual meets certain criteria, as determined by a professional (such as a psychologist, psychiatrist, speech-language pathologist, or paediatrician). The difference is in the degree, frequency, and intensity of reported symptoms and problems, and thus the two should not be confused. When the term learning disorder is used, it describes a group of disorders characterized by inadequate development of specific academic, language, and speech skills. Types of learning disorders include reading (dyslexia), arithmetic (dyscalculia) and writing (dysgraphia).

The unknown factor is the disorder that affects the brain's ability to receive and process information. This disorder can make it problematic for a person to learn as quickly or in the same way as someone who is not affected by a learning disability. People with a learning disability have trouble performing specific types of skills or completing tasks if left to figure things out by themselves or if taught in conventional ways.

Individuals with learning disabilities can face unique challenges that are often pervasive throughout the lifespan. Depending on the type and severity of the disability, interventions, and current technologies may be used to help the individual learn strategies that will foster future success. Some interventions can be quite simple, while others are intricate and complex. Current technologies may require student training to be effective classroom supports. Teachers, parents, and schools can create plans together that tailor intervention and accommodations to aid the individuals in successfully becoming independent learners. A multi-disciplinary team frequently helps to design the intervention and to coordinate the execution of the intervention with teachers and parents. This team frequently includes school psychologists, special educators, speech therapists (pathologists), occupational therapists, psychologists, ESL teachers, literacy coaches, and/or reading specialists.

== Definition ==
In the United States, a committee of representatives of organizations committed to the education and welfare of individuals with learning disabilities is known as the National Joint Committee on Learning Disabilities (NJCLD). The NJCLD, founded in 1975, used the term 'learning disability' to indicate a discrepancy between a child's apparent capacity to learn and their level of achievement. Several difficulties existed, however, with the NJCLD standard of defining learning disability. One such difficulty was its belief of central nervous system dysfunction as a basis of understanding and diagnosing learning disability. This conflicted with the fact that many individuals who experienced central nervous system dysfunction, such as those with cerebral palsy, did not experience disabilities in learning. On the other hand, those individuals who experienced multiple handicapping conditions along with learning disability frequently received inappropriate assessment, planning, and instruction. The NJCLD notes that it is possible for learning disability to occur simultaneously with other handicapping conditions; however, the two should not be directly linked together or confused.

In the 1980s, NJCLD, therefore, defined the term learning disability as:

a heterogeneous group of disorders manifested by significant difficulties in the acquisition and use of listening, speaking, reading, writing, reasoning or mathematical abilities. These disorders are intrinsic to the individual and presumed to be due to Central Nervous System Dysfunction. Even though a learning disability may occur concomitantly with other handicapping conditions (e.g. sensory impairment, intellectual disability, social and emotional disturbance) or environmental influences (e.g. cultural differences, insufficient/inappropriate instruction, psychogenic factors) it is not the direct result of those conditions or influences.

The 2002 LD Roundtable produced the following definition:

Concept of LD: Strong converging evidence supports the validity of the concept of specific learning disabilities (SLD). This evidence is particularly impressive because it converges across different indicators and methodologies. The central concept of SLD involves disorders of learning and cognition that are intrinsic to the individual. SLD are specific in the sense that these disorders each significantly affect a relatively narrow range of academic and performance outcomes. SLD may occur in combination with other disabling conditions, but they are not due primarily to other conditions, such as intellectual disability, behavioral disturbance, lack of opportunities to learn, or primary sensory deficits.

The issue of defining learning disabilities has generated significant and ongoing controversy. The term learning disability does not exist in DSM-IV, but it has been added to the DSM-5. The DSM-5 does not limit learning disorders to a particular diagnosis such as reading, mathematics, or written expression. Instead, it is a single diagnosis criterion describing drawbacks in general academic skills and includes detailed specifiers for the areas of reading, mathematics, and written expression.

=== United States and Canada ===
In the United States and Canada, the terms learning disability and learning disorder (LD) refer to a group of disorders that affect a broad range of academic and functional skills including the ability to speak, listen, read, write, spell, reason, organize information, and do math. People with learning disabilities may have average or higher intelligence. Awareness of the need to help college students compensate for learning disabilities spread across US college campuses during the 1990s. During this time, facing legal and institutional pressures, faculty members began providing accommodations for larger numbers of students in their courses.

==== Legislation in the United States ====
The Section 504 of the Rehabilitation Act 1973, effective May 1977, guarantees certain rights to people with disabilities, especially in the cases of education and work, such being in schools, colleges and university settings.

The Individuals with Disabilities Education Act, formerly known as the Education for All Handicapped Children Act, is a United States federal law that governs how states and public agencies provide early intervention, special education and related services to children with disabilities. It addresses the educational needs of children with disabilities from birth to the age of 21. Considered as a civil rights law, states are not required to participate.

==== Policymaking in Canada ====
In Canada, the first association in support of children with learning disabilities was founded in 1962 by a group of concerned parents. Originally called the Association for Children with Learning Disabilities, the Learning Disabilities Association of Canada (LDAC) was created to provide awareness and services for individuals with learning disabilities, their families, at work, and the community. Since education is largely the responsibility of each province and territory in Canada, provinces and territories have jurisdiction over the education of individuals with learning disabilities, which allows the development of policies and support programs that reflect the unique multicultural, linguistic, and socioeconomic conditions of its area.

=== United Kingdom ===
In the UK, terms such as specific learning difficulty (SpLD), developmental dyslexia, developmental coordination disorder and dyscalculia are used to cover the range of learning difficulties referred to in the United States as learning disabilities. In the UK, the term learning disability refers to a range of developmental disabilities or conditions that are almost invariably associated with more severe generalized cognitive impairment. The Lancet defines learning disability as a "significant general impairment in intellectual functioning acquired during childhood", and states that roughly one in 50 British adults have one.

=== Japan ===
In Japan, acknowledgement and support for students with learning disabilities has been a fairly recent development, and has improved drastically since the start of the 21st century. The first definition for learning disability was coined in 1999, and in 2001, the Enrichment Project for the Support System for Students with Learning Disabilities was established. Since then, there have been significant efforts to screen children for learning disabilities, provide follow-up support, and provide networking between schools and specialists.

== Effects ==
The effects of having a learning disability or learning difference are not limited to educational outcomes: individuals with learning disabilities may experience social problems as well. Neuropsychological differences can affect the accurate perception of social cues with peers. Researchers argue persons with learning disabilities not only experience negative effects as a result of their learning distinctions, but also as a result of carrying a stigmatizing label. It has generally been difficult to determine the efficacy of special education services because of data and methodological limitations. Emerging research suggests adolescents with learning disabilities experience poorer academic outcomes even compared to peers who began high school with similar levels of achievement and comparable behaviors. It seems their poorer outcomes may be at least partially due to the lower expectations of their teachers; national data show teachers hold expectations for students labeled with learning disabilities that are inconsistent with their academic potential (as evidenced by test scores and learning behaviors). It has been said that there is a strong connection between children with a learning disability and their educational performance.

Many studies have been done to assess the correlation between learning disability and self-esteem. These studies have shown that an individual's self-esteem is indeed affected by their own awareness of their learning disability. Students with a positive perception of their academic abilities generally tend to have higher self-esteem than those who do not, regardless of their actual academic achievement. However, studies have also shown that several other factors can influence self-esteem. Skills in non-academic areas, such as athletics and arts, improve self-esteem. Also, a positive perception of one's physical appearance has also been shown to have positive effects of self-esteem. Another important finding is that students with learning disabilities are able to distinguish between academic skill and intellectual capacity. This demonstrates that students who acknowledge their academic limitations but are also aware of their potential to succeed in other intellectual tasks see themselves as intellectually competent individuals, which increases their self-esteem.

Research involving individuals with learning disabilities who exhibit challenging behaviors who are subsequently treated with antipsychotic medications provides little evidence that any benefits outweigh the risk.

== Causes ==
The causes for learning disabilities are not well understood, and sometimes there is no apparent cause for a learning disability. However, some causes of neurological impairments include:

- Heredity and genetics: Learning disabilities are often linked through genetics and run in the family. Children who have learning disabilities often have parents who have the same struggles. Children of parents who had less than 12 years of school are more likely to have a reading disability. Some children have spontaneous mutations (i.e. not present in either parent) which can cause developmental disorders including learning disabilities. One study estimated that about one in 300 children had such spontaneous mutations: for example, a fault in the CDK13 gene which is associated with learning and communication difficulties in the children affected.
- Problems during pregnancy and birth: A learning disability can result from anomalies in the developing brain, illness or injury. Risk factors are foetal exposure to alcohol or drugs and low birth weight (3 pounds (1.4 kg) or less). These children are more likely to develop a disability in math or reading. Children who are born prematurely, late, have a longer labor than usual, or have trouble receiving oxygen are more likely to develop a learning disability.
- Accidents after birth: Learning disabilities can also be caused by head injuries, malnutrition, or by toxic exposure (such as heavy metals or pesticides).

== Diagnosis ==
=== IQ-achievement discrepancy ===
Learning disabilities can be identified by psychiatrists, speech language pathologists, school psychologists, clinical psychologists, counseling psychologists, neuropsychologists, and other learning disability specialists through a combination of intelligence testing, academic achievement testing, classroom performance, and social interaction and aptitude. Other areas of assessment may include perception, cognition, memory, attention, and language abilities. The resulting information is used to determine whether a child's academic performance is commensurate with their cognitive ability. If a child's cognitive ability is much higher than their academic performance, the student is often diagnosed with a learning disability. The DSM-IV and many school systems and government programs diagnose learning disabilities in this way (DSM-IV uses the term disorder rather than disability).

Although the discrepancy model has dominated the school system for many years, there has been substantial criticism of this approach among researchers. Recent research has provided little evidence that a discrepancy between formally measured IQ and achievement is a clear indicator of LD. Furthermore, diagnosing on the basis of a discrepancy does not predict the effectiveness of treatment. Low academic achievers who do not have a discrepancy with IQ (i.e. their IQ scores are also low) appear to benefit from treatment just as much as low academic achievers who do have a discrepancy with IQ (i.e. their IQ scores are higher than their academic performance would suggest).

Since 1998, there have been attempts to create a reference index more useful than IQ to generate predicted scores on achievement tests. For example, for a student whose vocabulary and general knowledge scores matches their reading comprehension score a teacher could assume that reading comprehension can be supported through work in vocabulary and general knowledge. If the reading comprehension score is lower in the appropriate statistical sense it would be necessary to first rule out things like vision problems.

=== Response to intervention ===
Much current research has focused on a treatment-oriented diagnostic process known as response to intervention (RTI). Researcher recommendations for implementing such a model include early screening for all students, placing those students who are having difficulty into research-based early intervention programs, rather than waiting until they meet diagnostic criteria. Their performance can be closely monitored to determine whether increasingly intense intervention results in adequate progress. Those who respond will not require further intervention. Those who do not respond adequately to regular classroom instruction (often called "Tier 1 instruction") and a more intensive intervention (often called "Tier 2" intervention) are considered "non-responders." These students can then be referred for further assistance through special education, in which case they are often identified with a learning disability. Some models of RTI include a third tier of intervention before a child is identified as having a learning disability.

A primary benefit of such a model is that it would not be necessary to wait for a child to be sufficiently far behind to qualify for assistance. This may enable more children to receive assistance before experiencing significant failure, which may, in turn, result in fewer children who need intensive and expensive special education services. In the United States, the 2004 reauthorization of the Individuals with Disabilities Education Act permitted states and school districts to use RTI as a method of identifying students with learning disabilities. RTI is now the primary means of identification of learning disabilities in Florida.

The process does not take into account children's individual neuropsychological factors such as phonological awareness and memory, which can inform design instruction. By not taking into account specific cognitive processes, RTI fails to inform educators about a students' relative strengths and weaknesses. Second, RTI by design takes considerably longer than established techniques, often many months to find an appropriate tier of intervention. Third, it requires a strong intervention program before students can be identified with a learning disability. Lastly, RTI is considered a regular education initiative and consists of members of general education teachers, in conjunction with other qualified professionals. Occupational therapists in particular can support students in the educational setting by helping children in academic and non-academic areas of school including the classroom, recess and meal time. They can provide strategies, therapeutic interventions, suggestions for adaptive equipment, and environmental modifications. Occupational therapists can work closely with the child's teacher and parents to facilitate educational goals specific to each child under an RTI and/or IEP.

=== Latino English-language learners ===
Demographers in the United States report that there has been a significant increase in immigrant children in the United States over the past two decades. This has affected and will continue to affect both students and the way educators approach teaching methods. Various teaching strategies are more successful for students who are linguistic or culturally diverse versus traditional methods of teaching used for students whose first language is English. It is then also true that the proper way to diagnose a learning disability in English-language learners (ELL) differs. In the United States, there has been a growing need to develop the knowledge and skills necessary to provide effective school psychological services, specifically for those professionals who work with immigrant populations.

Currently, there are no standardized guidelines for the process of diagnosing ELL with specific learning disabilities (SLD). This is a problem, since many students will fall through the cracks as educators are unable to clearly assess if a student's delay is due to a language barrier or true learning disability. Without a clear diagnosis, many students will suffer because they will not be provided with the tools they need to succeed in the public education school system. For example, in many occasions teachers have suggested retention or have taken no action at all when they lack experience working with English language learners. Students were commonly pushed toward testing, based on an assumption that their poor academic performance or behavioral difficulties indicated a need for special education. Linguistically responsive psychologists understand that second-language acquisition is a process as well as how to support ELLs' growth in language and academically. When ELLs are referred for a psychoeducational assessment, it is difficult to isolate and disentangle the effects of the language acquisition process, as opposed to poor quality educational services, and also as opposed to what may be academic difficulties resulting from processing disorders, attention problems, and learning disabilities. Additionally, untrained staff and faculty become more of an issue when staff is unaware of numerous types of psychological factors that immigrant children in the U.S. could be potentially dealing with. These factors include acculturation, fear and/or worry of deportation, separation from social supports such as parents, language barriers, educational disruption, stigmatization, economic challenges, and risk factors associated with poverty. In the United States, there are no set policies mandating that all districts employ bilingual school psychologists, nor are schools equipped with specific tools and resources to assist immigrant children and families. Many school districts do not have the proper personnel able to communicate with this population.

=== Spanish-speaking ELL ===
A well trained bilingual school psychologist will be able to administer and interpret assessments using psychological testing tools. Also, an emphasis is placed on informal assessment measures such as language samples, observations, interviews, and rating scales as well as curriculum-based measurement to complement information gathered from formal assessments. A compilation of these tests is used to assess whether an ELL student has a learning disability or merely is academically delayed because of language barriers or environmental factors. Many schools do not have a school psychologist with the proper training nor access to appropriate tools. Also, many school districts frown upon taking the appropriate steps to diagnosing ELL students.

=== Assessment ===
Many normed assessments can be used in evaluating skills in the primary academic domains: reading, including word recognition, fluency, and comprehension; mathematics, including computation and problem solving; and written expression, including handwriting, spelling and composition.

The most commonly used comprehensive achievement tests include the Woodcock-Johnson IV (WJ IV), Wechsler Individual Achievement Test II (WIAT II), the Wide Range Achievement Test III (WRAT III), and the Stanford Achievement Test–10th edition. These tests include measures of many academic domains that are reliable in identifying areas of difficulty.

In the reading domain, there are also specialized tests that can be used to obtain details about specific reading deficits. Assessments that measure multiple domains of reading include Gray's Diagnostic Reading Tests–2nd edition (GDRT II) and the Stanford Diagnostic Reading Assessment. Assessments that measure reading subskills include the Gray Oral Reading Test IV – Fourth Edition (GORT IV), Gray Silent Reading Test, Comprehensive Test of Phonological Processing (CTOPP), Tests of Oral Reading and Comprehension Skills (TORCS), Test of Reading Comprehension 3 (TORC-3), Test of Word Reading Efficiency (TOWRE), and the Test of Reading Fluency. A more comprehensive list of reading assessments may be obtained from the Southwest Educational Development Laboratory.

The purpose of assessment is to determine what is needed for intervention, which also requires consideration of contextual variables and whether there are comorbid disorders that must also be identified and treated, such as behavioral issues or language delays. These contextual variables are often assessed using parent and teacher questionnaire forms that rate the students' behaviors and compares them to standardized norms.

However, caution should be made when suspecting the person with a learning disability may also have dementia, especially as people with Down's syndrome may have the neuroanatomical profile but not the associated clinical signs and symptoms. Examination can be carried out of executive functioning, as well as social and cognitive abilities, but may need adaptation of standardized tests to take account of an individual's specific needs.

== Types ==
Learning disabilities can be categorized by either the type of information processing affected by the disability or by the specific difficulties caused by a processing deficit.

=== By stage of information processing ===
Learning disabilities fall into broad categories based on the four stages of information processing used in learning: input, integration, storage, and output. Many learning disabilities are a compilation of a few types of abnormalities occurring at the same time, as well as with social difficulties and emotional or behavioral disorders.

- Input: This is the information perceived through the senses, such as visual and auditory perception. Difficulties with visual perception can cause problems with recognizing the shape, position, or size of items seen. There can be problems with sequencing, which can relate to deficits with processing time intervals or temporal perception. Difficulties with auditory perception can make it difficult to screen out competing sounds in order to focus on one of them, such as the sound of the teacher's voice in a classroom setting. Some children appear to be unable to process tactile input. For example, they may seem insensitive to pain or dislike being touched.
- Integration: This is the stage during which perceived input is interpreted, categorized, placed in a sequence, or related to previous learning. Students with problems in these areas may be unable to tell a story in the correct sequence, unable to memorize sequences of information such as the days of the week, able to understand a new concept but be unable to generalize it to other areas of learning, or able to learn facts but be unable to put the facts together to see the "big picture." A poor vocabulary may contribute to problems with comprehension.
- Storage: Problems with memory can occur with short-term or working memory, or with long-term memory. Most memory difficulties occur with one's short-term memory, which can make it difficult to learn new material without more repetitions than usual. Difficulties with visual memory can impede learning to spell.
- Output: Information comes out of the brain either through words, that is, language output, or through muscle activity, such as gesturing, writing or drawing. Difficulties with language output can create problems with spoken language. Such difficulties include answering a question on demand, in which one must retrieve information from storage, organize one's thoughts, and put the thoughts into words before speaking. It can also cause trouble with written language for the same reasons. Difficulties with motor abilities can cause problems with gross and fine motor skills. People with gross motor difficulties may be clumsy, that is, they may be prone to stumbling, falling, or bumping into things. They may also have trouble running, climbing, or learning to ride a bicycle. People with fine motor difficulties may have trouble with handwriting, buttoning shirts, or tying shoelaces.

=== By function impaired ===
Deficits in any area of information processing can manifest in a variety of specific learning disabilities (SLD). It is possible for an individual to have more than one of these difficulties. This is referred to as comorbidity or co-occurrence of learning disabilities. In the UK, the term dual diagnosis is often used to refer to co-occurrence of learning difficulties.

==== Specific Learning Disorder (DSM-5-TR) and Developmental learning disorder (ICD-11: 6A03) ====
DSM-5-TR defines specific learning disorder as difficulties learning and using academic skills, substantially below the expected age, beginning during school-age years and has three specifiers for the type of impairment seen. ICD-11 defines developmental learning disorder similarly and has the same three specifiers.

- With impairment in reading (DSM-5-TR: F81.0, ICD-11: 6A03.0)

Learning difficulties are manifested in impairments in reading skills such as word reading accuracy, reading fluency or reading comprehension.

Previously termed 'reading disorder', this is the most common learning disability. Of all students with specific learning disabilities, 70–80% have deficits in reading. The term developmental dyslexia is often used as a synonym for reading disability; however, many researchers assert that there are different types of reading disabilities, of which dyslexia is one. A reading disability can affect any part of the reading process, including difficulty with accurate or fluent word recognition, or both, word decoding, reading rate, prosody (oral reading with expression), and reading comprehension. Before the term dyslexia came to prominence, this learning disability used to be known as word blindness.

Common indicators of reading disability include difficulty with phonemic awareness—the ability to break up words into their component sounds, and difficulty with matching letter combinations to specific sounds (sound-symbol correspondence).

- With impairment in written expression (DSM-5-TR: F81.81, ICD-11: 6A03.1)

Learning difficulties are manifested in impairments in writing skills such as spelling accuracy, grammar and punctuation accuracy, or organization and cohesion of ideas in writing.

Previously termed 'disorder of written expression'.

Individuals with a diagnosis of a disorder of written expression typically have a combination of difficulties in their abilities with written expression as evidenced by grammatical and punctuation errors within sentences, poor paragraph organization, multiple spelling errors, and excessively poor penmanship. A disorder in spelling or handwriting without other difficulties of written expression do not generally qualify for this diagnosis. If poor handwriting is due to an impairment in the individuals' motor coordination, a diagnosis of developmental coordination disorder should be considered.

By a number of organizations, the term dysgraphia has been used as an overarching term for all disorders of written expression.

- With impairment in mathematics (DSM-5-TR: F81.2, ICD-11: 6A03.2)

Sometimes called dyscalculia, a math disability involves difficulties such as learning math concepts (such as quantity, place value, and time), difficulty memorizing math facts, difficulty organizing numbers, and understanding how problems are organized on the page. Dyscalculics are often referred to as having poor number sense.

==== Non ICD-10/DSM ====
- Nonverbal learning disability: Nonverbal learning disabilities often manifest in motor clumsiness, poor visual-spatial skills, problematic social relationships, difficulty with mathematics, and poor organizational skills. These individuals often have specific strengths in the verbal domains, including early speech, large vocabulary, early reading and spelling skills, excellent rote memory and auditory retention, and eloquent self-expression.
- Disorders of speaking and listening: Difficulties that often co-occur with learning disabilities include difficulty with memory, social skills and executive functions (such as organizational skills and time management).

== Management ==
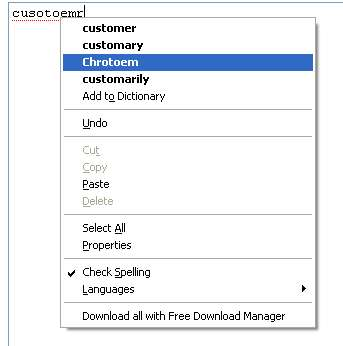
Spell checkers are one tool for managing learning disabilities.

Interventions include:

- Mastery model:
  - Learners work at their own level of mastery.
  - Practice
  - Gain fundamental skills before moving onto the next level
    - Note: this approach is most likely to be used with adult learners or outside the mainstream school system.
- Direct instruction:
  - Emphasizes carefully planned lessons for small learning increments
  - Scripted lesson plans
  - Rapid-paced interaction between teacher and students
  - Correcting mistakes immediately
  - Achievement-based grouping
  - Frequent progress assessments
- Classroom adjustments:
  - Special seating assignments
  - Alternative or modified assignments
  - Modified testing procedures
  - Quiet environment
- Special equipment:
  - Word processors with spell checkers and dictionaries
  - Text-to-speech and speech-to-text programs
  - Talking calculators
  - Books on tape
  - Computer-based activities
- Classroom assistants:
  - Note-takers
  - Readers
  - Proofreaders
  - Scribes
- Special education:
  - Prescribed hours in a resource room
  - Placement in a resource room
  - Enrollment in a special school or a separate classroom in a regular school for learning disabled students
  - Individual education plan (IEP)
  - Educational therapy

Sternberg has argued that early remediation can greatly reduce the number of children meeting diagnostic criteria for learning disabilities. He has also suggested that the focus on learning disabilities and the provision of accommodations in school fails to acknowledge that people have a range of strengths and weaknesses, and places undue emphasis on academic success by insisting that people should receive additional support in this arena but not in music or sports. Other research has pinpointed the use of resource rooms as an important—yet often politicized component of educating students with learning disabilities.

=== Helping individuals with learning disabilities ===
Many individuals with learning disabilities may not openly disclose their condition. Some experts say that an instructor directly asking or assuming potential disabilities could cause potential harm to an individual's self-esteem. In addition, if information about certain disabilities were made aware, it may be beneficial to be mindful about one's approach regarding the disability and avoid vocabulary that may insinuate that the learning disability is an obstacle or shortcoming as this may potentially be harmful to an individual's mental health and self esteem. Research suggests that accumulating positive experiences such as success in interpersonal relationships, achievements, and overcoming stress leads to the formation of self-esteem leading to the acceptance of one's disability and a better life outcome. This suggests that working with the disability may result in more positive outcomes rather than attempting to fix it. For instructors or tutors, it may be helpful to consider asking the needs of individuals with disabilities, as they know their disability the best:

- What part of the assignment do you want to focus on?
- Where in our space would you most prefer to work?
- What tools or technologies do you tend to use most frequently when you write?
- Are you comfortable reading your paper out loud or would you prefer if I read it?
- How do you learn best (i.e. Do you learn best by doing, seeing, or hearing)?

== Society and culture (United States) ==
=== School laws ===
Schools in the United States have a legal obligation to new arrivals to the country, including undocumented students. The landmark Supreme Court ruling Plyler v. Doe (1982) grants all children, no matter their legal status, the right to a free education. Additionally, specifically in regards to ELLs, the supreme court ruling Lau v. Nichols (1974) stated that equal treatment in school did not mean equal educational opportunity. This ruling is also supported by English language development services provided in schools, but these rulings do not require the individuals that teach and provide services to have any specific training nor is licensing different from a typical teacher or services provider.

==== Issues regarding standardized testing ====
Problems still exist regarding the fairness of standardized testing. Providing testing accommodations to students with learning disabilities has become increasingly common. One issue that introduces iniquity to those with disabilities is the handwriting bias. The handwriting bias involves the tendency of raters to identify more personally with authors of handwritten essays compared to word-processed (typed) essays, resulting in awarding a higher rating to the handwritten essays despite both essays being identical in terms of content. Several studies have analyzed the differences in standardized scores of handwriting and word-processed essays between students with and without disability. Results suggest handwritten essays of students with and without disabilities consistently received higher scores compared to word-processed versions.

=== Critique of the medical model ===
Learning disability theory is founded in the medical model of disability, in which disability is perceived as an individual deficit that is biological in origin. Researchers working within a social model of disability assert that there are social or structural causes of disability or the assignation of the label of disability, and even that disability is entirely socially constructed. Since the turn of the 19th century, education in the United States has been geared toward producing citizens who can effectively contribute to a capitalistic society, with a cultural premium on efficiency and science. More agrarian cultures, for example, do not even use learning ability as a measure of adult adequacy, whereas the diagnosis of learning disabilities is prevalent in Western capitalistic societies because of the high value placed on speed, literacy, and numeracy in both the labor force and school system.

=== Culture ===
There are three patterns that are well known in regards to mainstream students and minority labels in the United States:

- "A higher percentage of minority children than of white children are assigned to special education";
- "within special education, white children are assigned to less restrictive programs than are their minority counterparts";
- "the data — driven by inconsistent methods of diagnosis, treatment, and funding — make the overall system difficult to describe or change".

In the present day, it has been reported that white districts have more children from minority backgrounds enrolled in special education than they do majority students. "It was also suggested that districts with a higher percentage of minority faculty had fewer minority students placed in special education suggesting that 'minority students are treated differently in predominantly white districts than in predominantly minority districts'".

Educators have only recently started to look into the effects of culture on learning disabilities. If a teacher ignores a student's culturally diverse background, the student will suffer in the class. "The cultural repertoires of students from cultural learning disorder backgrounds have an impact on their learning, school progress, and behavior in the classroom". These students may then act out and not excel in the classroom and will, therefore, be misdiagnosed: "Overall, the data indicates that there is a persistent concern regarding the misdiagnosis and inappropriate placement of students from diverse backgrounds in special education classes since the 1975".

=== Social roots of learning disabilities in the U.S. ===
Learning disabilities have a disproportionate identification of racial and ethnic minorities and students who have low socioeconomic status (SES). While some attribute the disproportionate identification of racial/ethnic minorities to racist practices or cultural misunderstanding, others have argued that racial/ethnic minorities are overidentified because of their lower status. Similarities were noted between the behaviors of "brain-injured" and lower class students as early as the 1960s. The distinction between race/ethnicity and SES is important to the extent that these considerations contribute to the provision of services to children in need. While many studies have considered only one characteristic of the student at a time, or used district- or school-level data to examine this issue, more recent studies have used large national student-level datasets and sophisticated methodology to find that the disproportionate identification of African American students with learning disabilities can be attributed to their average lower SES, while the disproportionate identification of Latino youth seems to be attributable to difficulties in distinguishing between linguistic proficiency and learning ability. Although the contributing factors are complicated and interrelated, it is possible to discern which factors really drive disproportionate identification by considering a multitude of student characteristics simultaneously. For instance, if high SES minorities have rates of identification that are similar to the rates among high SES Whites, and low SES minorities have rates of identification that are similar to the rates among low SES Whites, we can know that the seemingly higher rates of identification among minorities result from their greater likelihood to have low SES. Summarily, because the risk of identification for White students who have low SES is similar to that of Black students who have low SES, future research and policy reform should focus on identifying the shared qualities or experiences of low SES youth that lead to their disproportionate identification, rather than focusing exclusively on racial/ethnic minorities. It remains to be determined why lower SES youth are at higher risk of incidence, or possibly just of identification, with learning disabilities.

=== Learning disabilities in adulthood ===
A common misconception about those with learning disabilities is that they outgrow it as they enter adulthood. This is often not the case and most adults with learning disabilities still require resources and care to help manage their disability. One resource is Adult Basic Education (ABE) programs on the state level. ABE programs are allotted certain amounts of funds per state in order to provide resources for adults with learning disabilities. This includes resources to help them learn basic life skills in order to provide for themselves. ABE programs also provide help for adults who lack a high school diploma or an equivalent. These programs teach skills to help adults get into the workforce or into a further level of education. Some ABE programs offer General Education Development (GED) preparation programs to support adults through the process to get a GED. However, ABE programs do not always lead to expected outcomes on employment, for example. Participants in ABE programs are given tools to help them succeed and get a job, but employment varies, based on the level of growth a participant experiences in an ABE program, the personality and behavior of the participant, and the job market they are entering into following completion of the program.

Another resource for disabled adults is federal programs called Home- and Community-Based Services (HCBS). Medicaid funds these programs for many people through a fee waiver system; however, many people must still wait on a stand-by list. These programs are primarily used for autistic adults. HCBS programs offer services more dedicated to caring for the adult, and less so for providing resources for them to transition into the workforce. Some services provided are therapy, social skills training, support groups, and counseling.

== Contrast with other conditions ==
People with an IQ lower than 70 are usually characterized as having an intellectual disability and are not included under most definitions of learning disabilities because their difficulty in learning is considered to be related directly to their overall low intelligence.

Attention-deficit hyperactivity disorder (ADHD) is often studied in connection with learning disabilities, but it is not actually included in the standard definitions of learning disabilities. Individuals with ADHD may struggle with learning, but can often learn adequately once successfully treated for the ADHD. A person can have ADHD but not learning disabilities or have learning disabilities without having ADHD. The conditions can co-occur.

People diagnosed with ADHD sometimes have impaired learning. Some of the struggles people with ADHD have might include lack of motivation, high levels of anxiety, and the inability to process information. There are studies that suggest people with ADHD generally have a positive attitude toward academics and, with medication and developed study skills, can perform just as well as individuals without learning disabilities. Also, using alternate sources of gathering information, such as websites, study groups and learning centers, can help a person with ADHD be academically successful.

Before the discovery of ADHD, the disorder was technically included in the definition of LDs since it has a very pronounced effect on the executive functions required for learning. Thus, historically, ADHD was not clearly distinguished from other disabilities related to learning. Therefore, when a person presents with difficulties in learning, ADHD should be considered as well.

== Learning disabilities affect the writing process ==
The ability to express one's thoughts and opinions in an organized fashion and in written form is an essential life skill that individuals have been taught and practiced repetitively since youth. The writing process includes, but is not limited to: understanding the genre, style, reading, critical thinking, writing and proofreading. In the case of individuals possessing a learning disability, deficits may be present that could impair the individual's ability to carry out these necessary steps and express their thoughts in an organized manner. Reading is a crucial step to quality writing; oftentimes, it is practiced from a young age. Reading increases the attention span, allows exposure to a variety of genres and writing styles, and allows for the accumulation of a wide range of vocabulary.

Studies suggest that students with learning disabilities typically have difficulty with word recognition, the process of connecting the text to its meaning. This makes the reading process slow and cognitively laborious, which can be a very frustrating experience, causing students with learning disabilities to spend less time reading compared to their classmates. This, in turn, can negatively affect vocabulary acquisition and comprehension development of the individual.

In the context of standardized test taking, studies show that the strongest predictor of the level of performance during standardized essay writing was vocabulary complexity, specifically, the number of words with more than two syllables. Studies have suggested that individuals with ADHD tend to use simple structures and vocabulary. This puts many students with learning disabilities at a disadvantage since their knowledge of complex vocabulary usually does not compare to their peers. Based on such patterns, early interventions such as reading and writing curriculums from a young age could provide opportunities for vocabulary acquisition and development.

In addition, some students with learning disabilities tend to have difficulty separating the different stages of writing and devote little time to the planning stage. Oftentimes, they attempt to simultaneously reflect on their spelling while putting ideas together causing them to overload their attention system and make a number of spelling mistakes.

All together, the tendency of students with learning disabilities to dedicate little time to the planning and revision process compared to their peers often results in a lower level of coherence and quality of their written composition and a lower quality rating in the case for standardized tests. There is a lack of research in this area due to the complex relationship between the brain and one's ability to articulate ideas in writing. More research should be conducted in order to assess these factors and test the effectiveness of various intervention techniques.
