= GeneDx =

American biotechnology company

- Type: Public
- Traded as: Nasdaq: WGS
- Industry: Biotechnology, genome testing
- Founded: 2000; 26 years ago
- Founder: Sherri Bale, John Compton
- Headquarters: Stamford, CT
- Key people: Katherine Stueland (CEO); Kevin Feeley (CFO); Bryan Dechairo (COO); Jason Ryan (Executive Chair of the Board)
- Products: Exome/genome sequencing
- Website: www.genedx.com

GeneDx is an American biotechnology company specializing in genomic diagnostics, with a focus on whole genome sequencing (WGS) and whole exome sequencing (WES) for the diagnosis of rare and inherited disorders. The company provides genetic testing services to healthcare providers, hospitals, and health systems, and contributes to advancements in genomic medicine through research, biopharma partnerships, and advocacy. The company is headquartered in Stamford, Connecticut, with its clinical laboratory in Gaithersburg, Maryland, and is publicly traded on the Nasdaq under the ticker symbol WGS.

GeneDx was founded in 2000 by Sherri Bale and John Compton, scientists from the National Institutes of Health (NIH), to provide diagnostic services for patients with rare and ultra-rare disorders. The company was acquired by BioReference Laboratories in 2006 and subsequently by Sema4 in 2022, after which it underwent a strategic transformation refocusing on whole exome and genome sequencing in pediatrics and changed its name to GeneDx. Since launching exome testing in 2011, the company has built GeneDx Infinity, a rare disease dataset including more than one million clinically sequenced exomes and genomes, more than 2.5 million tests, and more than 8 million phenotypic datapoints.

In 2024, GeneDx reported revenue of $302.3 million, representing 56% year-over-year growth, and announced its first profitable quarter. For full-year 2025, the company reported revenue of approximately $427 million.

== History ==
GeneDx was founded in 2000 by scientists Sherri Bale and John Compton from the National Institutes of Health (NIH). The company was established to provide clinical diagnostic services for patients and families with rare and ultra-rare disorders, for which limited commercial testing options existed at the time. The company started in the Technology Development Center, a biotech incubator supported by the state of Maryland and Montgomery County, MD.

In 2006, GeneDx was acquired by BioReference Laboratories and continued to operate as a subsidiary. In October 2016, Benjamin D. Solomon was appointed as managing director.

In 2021, Katherine Stueland became CEO of GeneDx. GeneDx was acquired by Sema4 in 2022, and Stueland was named CEO of the combined company. In 2023, the combined company underwent a strategic transformation, refocusing on whole exome and genome sequencing in pediatrics, and changed its name to GeneDx.

In 2025 GeneDx was named one of Fast Company's Most Innovative Companies, ranked No.2 in the Biotech category. The recognition highlighted the company's work in advancing genomic sequencing and data-driven approaches to improve rare disease diagnosis.

GeneDx settled a patent dispute with Myriad Genetics in February 2015 after GeneDx launched a BRCA mutation breast cancer genetic screening test following the US Supreme Court decision in Association for Molecular Pathology v. Myriad Genetics, Inc. that concluded isolated gene sequences were patent ineligible.

== Management ==
Katherine Stueland was appointed CEO of GeneDx in 2021. Under her leadership, the company refocused its operations on exome and genome sequencing for rare disease diagnosis. Stueland has been recognized for her work in genomic medicine, including being named to CNBC's Changemakers list in 2025 and to the TIME100 Health list in 2026.

Kevin Feeley was appointed CFO in 2022. Prior to joining GeneDx, Feeley served as CFO of BioReference Laboratories and held senior roles at KPMG LLP.

Bryan Dechairo was appointed COO in 2025.

== Products and services ==
GeneDx offers genetic testing services with a primary focus on whole genome sequencing (WGS) and whole exome sequencing (WES). WGS provides a comprehensive analysis of an individual's entire genome, while WES focuses on protein-coding regions called exons, which contain a majority of known disease-related genetic variants. The company's tests are used in clinical diagnostics, research, and precision medicine by geneticists, genetic counselors, neonatologists, pediatric specialists, and pediatricians.

GeneDx offers testing for conditions including rare diseases, autism spectrum disorders, epilepsy, neurodevelopmental disorders, cardiomyopathies, and inherited conditions affecting vision, the immune system, muscles, hearing, metabolism, neurology, and mitochondrial diseases. GeneDx also offers rapid sequencing options intended for critically ill pediatric and neonatal patients where timely results may influence acute medical management. GeneDx continues to develop genetic testing technologies for clinical use in pediatric, adult, and newborn populations.

Professional guidelines from organizations such as the American College of Medical Genetics and Genomics (ACMG) and the American Academy of Pediatrics (AAP) support the use of exome or genome sequencing as first-line or early diagnostic tests in selected patient populations.

GeneDx's biopharma business focuses on leveraging GeneDx Infinity to provide partners with access to molecularly confirmed genomic data, longitudinal patient information, and curated phenotypic data to support drug discovery, clinical development, real-world evidence generation and other therapeutic development needs. The company partners with biopharma and data companies to accelerate rare disease research and improve the efficiency and success rate of therapy development programs.

== Developments and Milestones ==
Breakthrough Device Designation

In October 2025, the company's ExomeDx and GenomeDx testing was granted FDA Breakthrough Device designation for use in diagnosing symptomatic patients with life-threatening diseases or genetic disorders.

Acquisition of Fabric Genomics

In April 2025, GeneDx announced the acquisition of Fabric Genomics, an AI-powered genomic interpretation company. The transaction closed in May 2025 for up to $33 million in cash at closing, with total consideration potentially reaching $51 million upon achievement of certain milestones.

Financial Performance

In 2024, GeneDx reported revenue of $302.3 million, representing 56% year-over-year growth, and announced its first profitable quarter in October 2024. For full-year 2025, the company reported revenue of approximately $427 million.

Genomic Newborn Screening

GeneDx is a sequencing and interpretation partner in the GUARDIAN (Genomic Uniform-screening Against Rare Diseases In All Newborns) study, a research initiative examining whether whole genome sequencing can improve health outcomes for newborns. The study is conducted in collaboration with Columbia University, NewYork-Presbyterian, the New York State Department of Health, and Illumina. Results from the study were published in JAMA in October 2024, reporting a 3.7% screen-positive rate among enrolled newborns. 92% of true-positives would not have been detected using standard newborn screening technology. The study has enrolled over 20,000 newborns and expanded its panel to include 446 genes associated with more than 460 actionable conditions. The GUARDIAN study was recognized by JAMA as Research of the Year for 2025.

Additionally, GeneDx is a partner in Florida's Sunshine Genetics Program, the first state-supported initiative to integrate genomic sequencing into newborn screening.

== Research Contributions ==
GeneDx researchers have contributed to peer-reviewed publications in major scientific and medical journals, generating data to expand access to genomic testing. In 2020, GeneDx researchers co-authored a study published in Nature analyzing data from 31,058 exome trios to identify 28 previously undescribed genes associated with developmental disorders, providing diagnoses for approximately 500 families. A 2021 study in JAMA, using data from GeneDx, found that exome sequencing identified pathogenic or likely pathogenic variants in 32.7% of pediatric patients with cerebral palsy, providing evidence to support genetic testing guidelines for the condition.

In 2025, GeneDx collaborated with Seattle Children's and the University of Washington on the SeqFirst research program, which produced two publications. The SeqFirst-Neo study, published in the American Journal of Human Genetics, found that applying broad exclusion criteria for rapid genome sequencing in NICUs increased the odds of a precise genetic diagnosis ninefold compared to conventional care, with 42% of diagnosed infants having been missed under standard protocols. A companion study published in The Journal of Pediatrics demonstrated that implementing rapid genome sequencing as a first-tier test in non-critical pediatric inpatient wards reduced the average time to a precise genetic diagnosis from 289 days to 13 days.

As of 2025, GeneDx has contributed to more than 1,100 peer-reviewed publications and contributes to more than 500 validated gene-disease associations through the GeneMatcher platform.

In 2026, GeneDx researchers published a validation study in Human Genetics describing Multiscore, an AI-powered gene prioritization tool, that combines machine learning with real-world clinical data from the GeneDx database alongside published literature and OMIM, correctly prioritized the causative gene within the top 10 candidates in 83.5% of cases, outperforming existing phenotype-based prioritization tools including Phrank and LIRICAL.

A 2026 real-world health economics analysis (SAVES-Kids), presented at the American College of Medical Genetics (ACMG) annual meeting, found GeneDx's exome and genome sequencing reduced total healthcare costs by up to 61% in the 12 months following testing for children with neurodevelopmental disorders. For children with epilepsy, that represents an average of approximately $80,000 per patient per year.
