= TELO2 =

Human protein

Identifiers
- Aliases: TELO2, CLK2, TEL2, telomere maintenance 2, YHFS
- External IDs: OMIM: 611140; MGI: 1918968; GeneCards: TELO2
Available structures
PDB	Ortholog search: PDBe RCSB
PDB	List of PDB id codes 4PSI

Gene location (Human)
Chr.	Chromosome 16 (human)
Band	16p13.3	Start	1,493,344 bp
Band	16p13.3	End	1,510,457 bp

Gene location (Mouse)
Chr.	Chromosome 17 (mouse)
Band	17|17 A3.3	Start	25,318,544 bp
Band	17|17 A3.3	End	25,334,941 bp
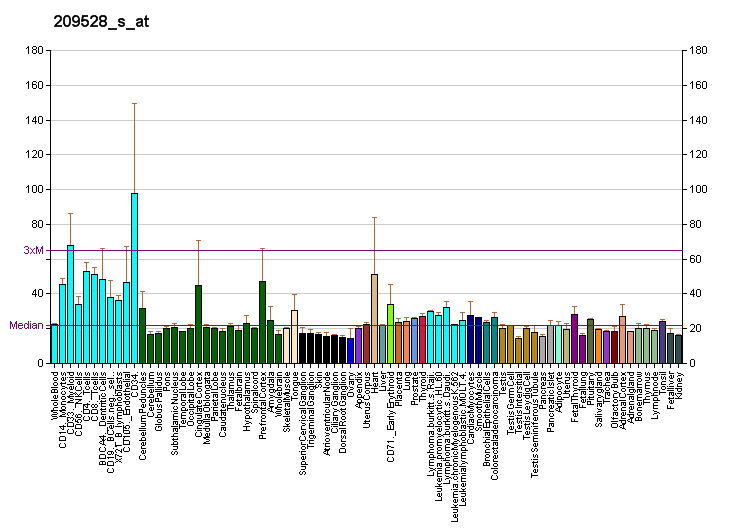

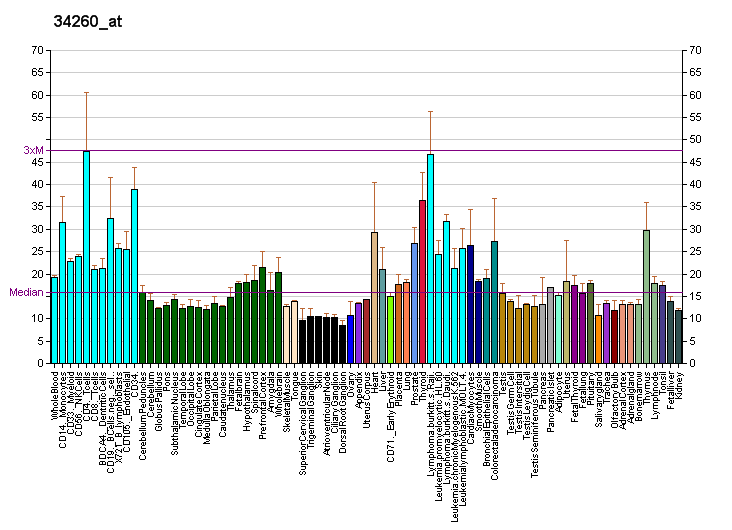
RNA expression pattern
Bgee	Human / Mouse (ortholog); Top expressed in: right uterine tube; right hemisphere of cerebellum; apex of heart; granulocyte; right lobe of liver; gastric mucosa; mucosa of transverse colon; spleen; canal of the cervix; anterior pituitary / Top expressed in: molar; inferior colliculi; paraventricular nucleus of hypothalamus; olfactory tubercle; globus pallidus; external carotid artery; deep cerebellar nuclei; medial geniculate nucleus; subiculum; anterior amygdaloid area; More reference expression data
BioGPS	More reference expression data
Gene ontology
Molecular function	molecular adaptor activity; Hsp90 protein binding; protein binding; protein kinase binding; protein-containing complex binding; telomeric DNA binding
Cellular component	cytoplasm; telomere; TORC1 complex; TORC2 complex; intracellular anatomical structure; membrane; nuclear periphery; nucleus; chromosome; cytosol; nuclear body; ASTRA complex
Biological process	positive regulation of TORC1 signaling; protein stabilization; regulation of TOR signaling; positive regulation of TORC2 signaling; positive regulation of protein serine/threonine kinase activity; telomere maintenance
Sources:Amigo / QuickGO
Orthologs
Databases	NCBI: entry; OMA: entry
Species	Human	Mouse
Entrez	9894	71718
Ensembl	ENSG00000100726	ENSMUSG00000024170
UniProt	Q9Y4R8	Q9DC40
RefSeq (mRNA)	NM_016111; NM_001351846	NM_001163661; NM_027880
RefSeq (protein)	NP_057195; NP_001338775	NP_001157133; NP_082156
Location (UCSC)	Chr 16: 1.49 – 1.51 Mb	Chr 17: 25.32 – 25.33 Mb
PubMed search
- Wikidata
View/Edit Human	View/Edit Mouse

Telomere length regulation protein TEL2 homolog is a protein that in humans is encoded by the TELO2 gene.

== Function ==
In 2007, researchers reported an unexpected role for Tel2 in the expression of all mammalian phosphatidylinositol 3-kinase-related protein kinases (PIKKs). Although Tel2 was identified as a budding yeast gene required for the telomere length maintenance, they found no obvious telomeric function for mammalian Tel2. Tel2 deletion also curbed mTOR signaling, indicating that Tel2 affects mammalian PIKKs. Tel2 binds to part of the HEAT repeat segments of ATM and mTOR and is a highly conserved regulator of PIKK stability.
