= Cyclin-dependent kinase 13 =

Enzyme found in humans

CDK13

Identifiers
- Aliases: CDK13, CDC2L, CDC2L5, CHED, hcyclin-dependent kinase 13, cyclin dependent kinase 13, CHDFIDD
- External IDs: OMIM: 603309; MGI: 1916812; GeneCards: CDK13
Available structures
PDB	Ortholog search: PDBe RCSB
PDB	List of PDB id codes 5EFQ
Enzyme activity
EC #	BRENDA	ExPASy	KEGG	MetaCyc
2.7.11.22	↗	↗	↗	↗
2.7.11.23	↗	↗	↗	↗

Gene location (Human)
Chr.	Chromosome 7 (human)
Band	7p14.1	Start	39,950,121 bp
Band	7p14.1	End	40,099,580 bp

Gene location (Mouse)
Chr.	Chromosome 13 (mouse)
Band	13|13 A2	Start	17,884,900 bp
Band	13|13 A2	End	17,979,682 bp
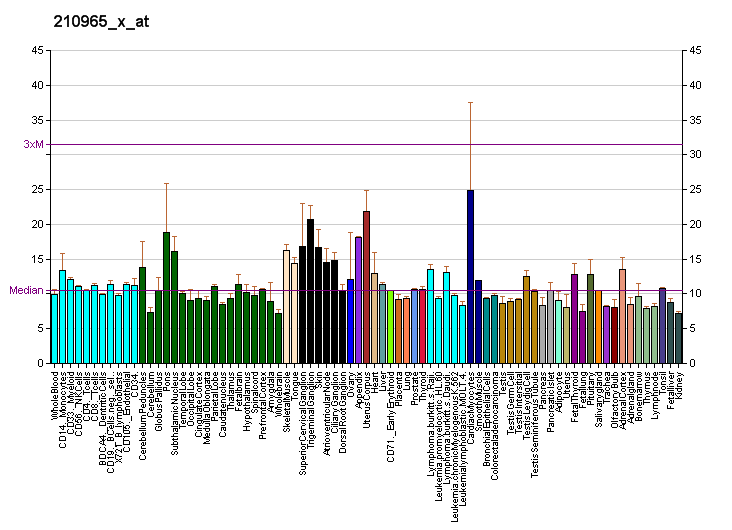
RNA expression pattern
Bgee	Human / Mouse (ortholog); Top expressed in: buccal mucosa cell; renal medulla; visceral pleura; pylorus; nipple; cardia; endothelial cell; ventral tegmental area; inferior ganglion of vagus nerve; parietal pleura / Top expressed in: genital tubercle; tail of embryo; spermatocyte; Rostral migratory stream; hand; granulocyte; spermatid; thymus; gastrula; neural layer of retina; More reference expression data
BioGPS	More reference expression data
Gene ontology
Molecular function	transferase activity; protein kinase activity; nucleotide binding; kinase activity; protein serine/threonine kinase activity; protein binding; RNA polymerase II CTD heptapeptide repeat kinase activity; ATP binding; cyclin binding; cyclin-dependent protein serine/threonine kinase activity; transcription factor binding; protein kinase binding; RNA binding
Cellular component	Golgi apparatus; nuclear speck; nuclear cyclin-dependent protein kinase holoenzyme complex; cyclin K-CDK13 complex; nucleus; extracellular region; extracellular space; nucleoplasm; chromosome; cytosol; cyclin/CDK positive transcription elongation factor complex; ficolin-1-rich granule lumen; cyclin-dependent protein kinase holoenzyme complex
Biological process	hemopoiesis; phosphorylation of RNA polymerase II C-terminal domain; phosphorylation; mRNA processing; multicellular organism development; protein phosphorylation; RNA splicing; positive regulation of cell population proliferation; viral process; alternative mRNA splicing, via spliceosome; regulation of mitotic nuclear division; transcription elongation from RNA polymerase II promoter; neutrophil degranulation; positive regulation of transcription by RNA polymerase II; negative regulation of stem cell differentiation; positive regulation of transcription elongation from RNA polymerase II promoter
Sources:Amigo / QuickGO
Orthologs
Databases	NCBI: entry; OMA: entry
Species	Human	Mouse
Entrez	8621	69562
Ensembl	ENSG00000065883	ENSMUSG00000041297
UniProt	Q14004	Q69ZA1
RefSeq (mRNA)	NM_003718; NM_031267	NM_001081058; NM_027118
RefSeq (protein)	NP_003709; NP_112557	NP_001074527; NP_081394
Location (UCSC)	Chr 7: 39.95 – 40.1 Mb	Chr 13: 17.88 – 17.98 Mb
PubMed search
- Wikidata
View/Edit Human	View/Edit Mouse

Cyclin dependent kinase 13 is an enzyme that in humans is encoded by the CDK13 gene.

The protein encoded by this gene is a member of the cyclin-dependent serine/threonine protein kinase family. Members of this family are well known for their essential roles as master switches in cell cycle control. Some of the cell cycle control kinases are able to phosphorylate proteins that are important for cell differentiation and apoptosis, thus provide connections between cell proliferation, differentiation, and apoptosis. Proteins of this family may also be involved in non-cell cycle-related functions, such as neurocytoskeleton dynamics. The exact function of this protein has not yet been determined. It has unusually large N- and C-termini and is ubiquitously expressed in many tissues. Two alternatively spliced variants are described.

== Clinical significance ==
Mutations in CDK13 cause CDK13-related disorder. A 2017 study of children with rare developmental disorders found 11 children in the United Kingdom who had a fault in their CDK13 gene. This fault affected the children's communication and language skills as well as causing learning difficulties.
