= Low-set ears =

Clinical sign of congenital conditions

- Specialty: Medical genetics

Low-set ears are a clinical feature in which the ears are positioned lower on the head than usual. They are present in many congenital conditions. Low-set ears are defined as the outer ears being positioned two or more standard deviations lower than the population average. Clinically, if the point at which the helix (curved upper part) of the outer ear meets the cranium is at or below the line connecting the inner canthi of eyes (the bicanthal plane), the ears are considered low set.

Low-set ears can be associated with conditions such as:

- Down syndrome
- Turner syndrome
- Noonan syndrome
- Patau syndrome
- DiGeorge syndrome
- Cri du chat syndrome
- Edwards syndrome
- Fragile X syndrome
- Okamoto syndrome

It is usually bilateral, but it can be unilateral (one sided) in Goldenhar syndrome.

== See also ==
- LEOPARD syndrome
