= SPATA5 =

Protein-coding gene in humans

Identifiers
- Aliases: SPATA5, AFG2, SPAF, EHLMRS, spermatogenesis associated 5, NEDHSB
- External IDs: OMIM: 613940; MGI: 1927170; GeneCards: SPATA5
Enzyme activity
EC #	BRENDA	ExPASy	KEGG	MetaCyc
3.6.4.10	↗	↗	↗	↗

Gene location (Human)
Chr.	Chromosome 4 (human)
Band	4q28.1	Start	122,923,070 bp
Band	4q28.1	End	123,319,433 bp

Gene location (Mouse)
Chr.	Chromosome 3 (mouse)
Band	3|3 B	Start	37,474,045 bp
Band	3|3 B	End	37,633,245 bp
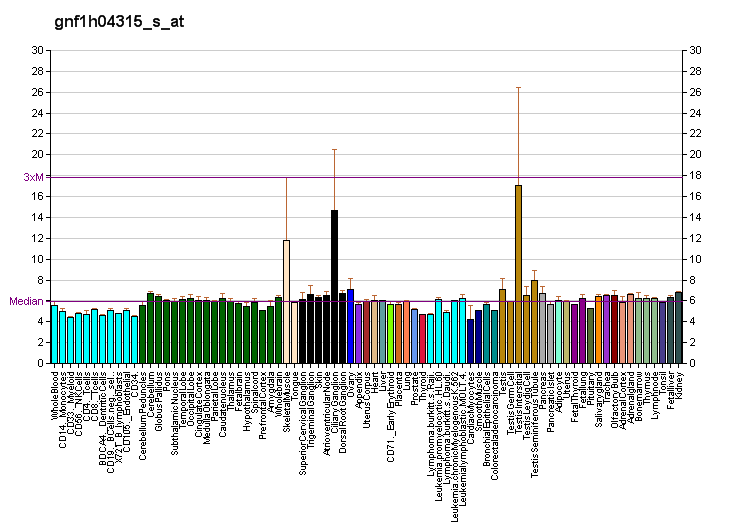

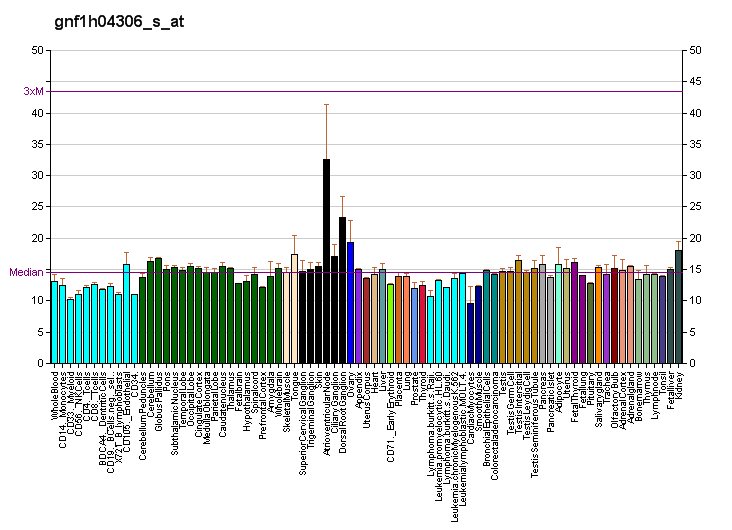

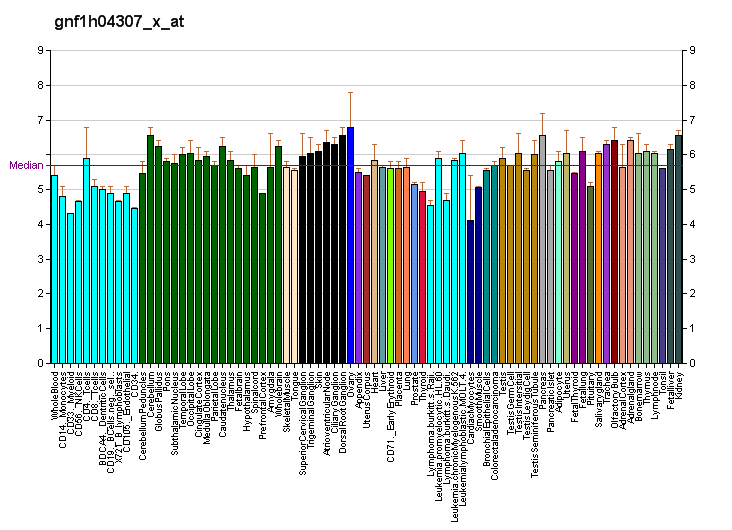
RNA expression pattern
Bgee	Human / Mouse (ortholog); Top expressed in: tendon of biceps brachii; Achilles tendon; palpebral conjunctiva; gonad; testicle; bone marrow cell; ventricular zone; internal globus pallidus; sural nerve; epithelium of colon / Top expressed in: spermatocyte; primitive streak; seminiferous tubule; primary oocyte; spermatid; Gonadal ridge; genital tubercle; tail of embryo; epiblast; motor neuron; More reference expression data
BioGPS	More reference expression data
Gene ontology
Molecular function	nucleotide binding; ATP binding; ATPase activity; hydrolase activity
Cellular component	cytoplasm; mitochondrion
Biological process	multicellular organism development; cell differentiation; brain development; spermatogenesis
Sources:Amigo / QuickGO
Orthologs
Databases	NCBI: entry; OMA: entry
Species	Human	Mouse
Entrez	166378	57815
Ensembl	ENSG00000145375	ENSMUSG00000027722
UniProt	Q8NB90	Q3UMC0
RefSeq (mRNA)	NM_145207; NM_001317799; NM_001345856	NM_001163511; NM_021343; NM_001310473
RefSeq (protein)	NP_001304728; NP_001332785; NP_660208	NP_001156983; NP_001297402; NP_067318
Location (UCSC)	Chr 4: 122.92 – 123.32 Mb	Chr 3: 37.47 – 37.63 Mb
PubMed search
- Wikidata
View/Edit Human	View/Edit Mouse

Spermatogenesis-associated protein 5 is a protein that in humans is encoded by the SPATA5 gene.
