= Sponastrime dysplasia =

Rare medical condition

- This condition is inherited in an autosomal recessive manner.
- Specialty: Medical genetics
- Causes: Mutations in the TONSL gene
- Frequency: 0.0001%

Sponastrime dysplasia is a rare condition characterised by facial and skeletal abnormalities.

== Signs and symptoms ==
The main features of this condition are evident in skeleton and face.

Facial features:

- Macrocephaly
- Frontal bossing
- Midface hypoplasia
- Depressed nasal root
- Small upturned nose
- Prognathism

Skeletal features:

- Shortened limbs (more pronounced in lower limbs)
- Short stature
- Progressive coxa vara

On X ray:

- Abnormal vertebral bodies (particularly in the lumbar region)
- Avascular necrosis of the capital femoral epiphyses
- Striated metaphyses
- Generalized mild osteoporosis
- Delayed ossification of the carpal bones

Other associated conditions:

These are variably present

- Cataracts
- Hypogammaglobulinemia
- Intellectual disability
- Short dental roots
- Subglottic stenosis
- Tracheobronchomalacia

== Genetics ==
This condition has been associated with mutations in the Tonsoku-like, DNA repair protein (TONSL) gene. This gene is located on the long arm of chromosome 8 (8q24.3). This gene is also known as NFKBIL2.

== Pathopysiology ==
This is not understood. It appears that the TONSL gene product is involved in genome repair.

== Diagnosis ==
This can be suspected when the usual facial and skeletal features are present. It is confirmed by sequencing the TONSL gene.

=== Differential diagnosis ===
Short limbed dwarfism syndrome in association with immunodeficiency.

== Treatment ==
There is no specific treatment for this condition. Management is supportive.

== Epidemiology ==
This condition is considered to be rare with less than 100 cases reported in the literature.

== History ==
This condition was first described in 1983.
