= BRSK1 =

Protein-coding gene in the species Homo sapiens

Identifiers
- Aliases: BRSK1, hSAD1, BR serine/threonine kinase 1, SAD-B
- External IDs: OMIM: 609235; MGI: 2685946; HomoloGene: 57169; GeneCards: BRSK1; OMA:BRSK1 - orthologs
- EC number: 2.7.11.26

Gene location (Human)
| Chr. | Chromosome 19 (human) |
| Band | 19q13.42 | Start | 55,282,072 bp |
| Band | 19q13.42 | End | 55,312,562 bp |

Gene location (Mouse)
| Chr. | Chromosome 7 (mouse) |
| Band | 7|7 A1 | Start | 4,693,603 bp |
| Band | 7|7 A1 | End | 4,718,996 bp |
RNA expression pattern
| Bgee | Human / Mouse (ortholog); Top expressed in: right frontal lobe; Brodmann area 9; right hemisphere of cerebellum; prefrontal cortex; cingulate gyrus; anterior cingulate cortex; ganglionic eminence; Amygdala; Hypothalamus; putamen / Top expressed in: primary visual cortex; superior frontal gyrus; dentate gyrus of hippocampal formation granule cell; prefrontal cortex; central gray substance of midbrain; cerebellar cortex; nucleus of stria terminalis; hippocampus proper; cingulate gyrus; piriform cortex; More reference expression data |
| BioGPS | n/a |
Gene ontology
| Molecular function | transferase activity; nucleotide binding; protein kinase activity; metal ion binding; kinase activity; protein kinase binding; magnesium ion binding; protein serine/threonine kinase activity; ATP binding; tau-protein kinase activity; gamma-tubulin binding; tau protein binding |
| Cellular component | synapse; nucleoplasm; microtubule organizing center; cytoskeleton; cell junction; cytoplasm; synaptic vesicle; centrosome; nucleus; presynaptic active zone; distal axon |
| Biological process | response to ionizing radiation; neuron projection morphogenesis; intracellular signal transduction; phosphorylation; nervous system development; cell cycle; response to UV; cellular response to DNA damage stimulus; centrosome duplication; establishment of cell polarity; neurotransmitter secretion; axonogenesis; neuron differentiation; protein phosphorylation; mitotic G2 DNA damage checkpoint signaling; associative learning; regulation of neuron projection development; regulation of synaptic plasticity; regulation of axonogenesis; microtubule cytoskeleton organization involved in establishment of planar polarity; synaptic vesicle cycle; regulation of synaptic vesicle clustering |
Sources:Amigo / QuickGO
Orthologs
| Species | Human | Mouse |
| Entrez | 84446 | 381979 |
| Ensembl | ENSG00000160469 | ENSMUSG00000035390 |
| UniProt | Q8TDC3 | Q5RJI5 |
| RefSeq (mRNA) | NM_032430 | NM_001003920; NM_001168572 |
| RefSeq (protein) | NP_115806 | NP_001003920; NP_001162044 |
| Location (UCSC) | Chr 19: 55.28 – 55.31 Mb | Chr 7: 4.69 – 4.72 Mb |
| PubMed search |
- Wikidata
| View/Edit Human | View/Edit Mouse |

BR serine/threonine kinase 1 is an enzyme that in humans is encoded by the BRSK1 gene.
