= Slit-Robo =

Slit-Robo is the name of a cell signaling protein complex - a process in which two or more associated polypeptide chains interact within a cell - that serves a variety of purposes including axon guidance and angiogenesis.

Slit refers to a secreted protein that is most widely known as a repulsive axon guidance cue, and Robo refers to its transmembrane protein receptor. In vertebrates, there are four different Robos and three Slits: Robo1, Robo2, Robo3/Rig-1, and Robo4, and Slit1, Slit2, Slit3. There are three Robos and a single Slit in Drosophila. The corresponding Slit and Robo homologues in C. elegans are Slt and Sax-3, respectively.

Slits are characterized by four distinct domains, each containing variable numbers of leucine-rich repeats (LRRs), seven to nine EGF repeats, an ALPS domain (Agrin, Perlecan, Laminin, Slit), and a cysteine knot. Robos are characterized by five Ig-like domains, three fibronectin type III (FNIII) repeats, a transmembrane portion, and an intracellular tail with up to four conserved cytoplasmic motifs: CC0 (a potential site of tyrosine phosphorylation), CC2 (polyproline stretch; consensus binding site for Ena/Vasp proteins), and CC3 (polyproline stretch).

== Background and discovery ==
In the developing nervous system of bilaterians, most axons cross over to the opposite (contralateral) side of the body. What are the genes that ensure that this process occurs appropriately? This fundamental question in axon guidance led researchers to Robo, which was identified in a large-scale screening of Drosophila mutants in the early 1990s. Robo expression was shown to be required for repulsion of axons from the midline, both in ipsilateral axons that never cross the midline and in commissural axons that had already crossed. Another protein Commissureless (Comm) was found to be an essential regulator of Robo: in comm mutants, Robo activity is too high, and no axons cross the midline. Several years later, genetic evidence, biochemical binding experiments, and explant assays identified Slits as the repulsive ligands for Robo receptors in both Drosophila and vertebrates. Slit was also found to act as a repulsive cue in olfactory bulb guidance. The high conservation of Slit and Robo structures and the similarities in their function among vertebrates and invertebrates make a strong case for an evolutionarily conserved requirement for Slit/Robo signaling in the developing nervous system.

== Cell signaling pathways ==
=== Slit-robo binding ===
The functional region of Slit proteins is located within the leucine-rich repeats (LRRs). Slit2 binds Robo1 in a flexible linkage between its D2 domain and the first two Ig-like domains of Robo1. Research suggests that heparan sulfate proteoglycans, which are required for Slit signaling in Drosophila, may support this interaction through stabilization of the Slit-Robo complex or by acting as co-receptors that present Slits to Robos.

=== Intracellular robo-binding events ===
Function of Slit-Robo signaling is influenced by binding of intracellular factors to the cytoplasmic domains of Robo.

==== Abelson and Enabled ====
In Drosophila, the two proteins Abelson tyrosine kinase (Abl) and Enabled (Ena) mediate cytoskeletal remodeling downstream of Slit-Robo signaling. Abl can phosphorylate Robo's CC0 and CC1 domains thereby down-regulating Robo activity, while Ena interacts with CC0 and CC2 to mediate repulsive signaling. Abl is also thought to promote repulsive signaling by binding to adenylyl cyclase associated proteins (CAP), which regulate actin polymerization.

==== Rho GTPases ====
Binding of Slit to Robo induces binding of SrGAP1 to the CC3 domain of Robo1, which leads to downstream deactivation of Cdc42, a Rho GTPase which mediates actin polymerization, and activation of RhoA, a Rho GTPase which mediates actin depolymerization. In Drosophila, the SH3-SH2 adaptor protein Dock binds directly to the CC2 and CC3 domains of Robo, recruiting p21-activated protein kinase (Pak) and Sos, resulting in increased Rac activity. This Robo-Dock association is increased by Slit-Robo binding, as is the recruitment of Sos. Drosophila Robo also directly interacts with the GAP Vilse or CrossGAP, which may function to down-regulate Rac activity.

=== Interactions with commissureless ===
Drosophila Commissureless (Comm) is a transmembrane protein expressed in commissural neurons. Comm promotes midline crossing by down-regulating Robo. A LPSY sorting signal motif has been shown to be required for Comm to sort Robo to endosomes, preventing it from accessing the surface of the growth cone. Thus, when Comm is expressed, axons are unaffected by the presence of Slit and are able to cross the midline. Comm expression is tightly regulated to ensure that axons down-regulate Robo at the correct time. In the absence of Comm, Robo is not appropriately down-regulated and all axons fail to cross the midline.

== Functions ==
Slits mediate cell communication in many diverse systems, regulating the guidance, cell migration and polarization of many different cell types.

=== Axon guidance ===
Slit-Robo interactions regulate axon guidance at the midline for commissural, retinal, olfactory, cortical, and precerebellar axons. Deletions of individual robos do not phenotypically match Slit mutants, indicating that Robos1-3 play distinct, complementary but not entirely overlapping roles in axon guidance. In Drosophila, Slit interactions with Robo1 and Robo2 function together in determining whether an axon will cross the midline, and both are necessary for proper crossing. Robo2 and Robo3 function together to specify the lateral position of the axon relative to the midline. The overlapping expression gradients of Robos along longitudinal tracts in the Central Nervous System (CNS) have been referred to as the "Robo-code," but it is unknown whether the formation of specific longitudinal tracts, mediated in this way by Robo, involves Slit signaling. It has been speculated that homophilic and heterophilic binding among Robos may be sufficient to mediate this effect.

In vertebrates, Robo1 and Robo2 work together to mediate repulsion from Slit ligands expressed at the floor plate, while Robo3/Rig-1 has the opposite activity, and functions to promote attraction to the midline (most likely by inhibiting the other two Robo receptors, via an unknown mechanism). Mice lacking all three Robos or all three Slits exhibit a phenotype similar to the Drosophila Slit mutant.

=== Axonal and dendritic branching ===
Slit2 and Slit1 have been shown to function as potential positive regulators of axon collateral formation during establishment or remodeling of neural circuits. In fact Slit2-N, an N-terminal fragment of Slit2, has been shown to induce Dorsal Root Ganglion (DRG) elongation and branching, whereas full length Slit2 antagonizes this effect. In central trigeminal sensory axons, however, full length Slit2, through interactions with semaphorin receptor plexin-A4 regulates axonal branching. Interactions between Slit and Robo in this process are unclear, but DRG express Robo2 and trigeminal axons express Robo1-2. Slit-Robo interactions are highly implicated, however, in the dendritic development of cortical neurons in that exposure to Slit1 leads to increased dendritic outgrowth and branching while inhibition of Slit-robo interactions attenuates dendritic branching.

=== Topographic projections ===
Axonal targeting by Slit-Robo appears to play an important role in the organization of topographic projections of axons which correspond to somatosensory receptive fields. In the Drosophila visual system, Slit and Robo prevent mixing of lamaina and lobula cells. Variable expression of Robo receptors on Drosophila olfactory neurons controls axonal organization in the olfactory lobes. In vertebrates, Slit1 plays an important role in vomeronasal organ (VNO) axonal targeting to the accessory olfactory bulb (AOB). In 2009, a combination of Slit-Robo and Netrin-Frazzled signaling in Drosophila was shown to govern the establishment of myotopic maps, which describe the innervation of motorneuron dendrites in the muscle field.

=== Cell migration ===
Slit-Robo has been shown to influence the migration of neurons and glia, leukocytes, and endothelial cells. Slit1 and Slit2 mediate the repulsive activity of the septum and choroid plexus which orient the migration of undifferentiated cells of the subventricular zone (SVZ) on the rostral migratory stream (RMS) to the olfactory bulb, where they differentiate into olfactory neurons. The contribution of Robo signaling in this system is unclear, but it is known that migrating neuroblasts do express Robo2 and Robo3 mRNAs.

During the developmental of mouse peripheral auditory system, Slit/Robo signaling imposes a restriction force on spiral ganglia neurons to ensure their precise positioning for correct spiral ganglia-cochlear hair cells innervations.

== Implications in disease ==
=== Cancer and vascular disease ===
The SLIT/ROBO pathway has been implicated in cancer with both anti-oncogenic and pro-oncogenic properties. Reduced expression of the Slit proteins and ROBO1 and 3 receptors has been associated with tumor progression in several cancers such as non-small cell lung cancer (NSCLC) and breast cancer. But Slits also showed tumor promoting activities in other cancers such as ductal carcinoma and prostate cancer.

Inhibition of Robo1, which colocalizes with von Willebrand factor in tumor endothelial cells, leads to reduced micro-vessel density and tumor mass of malignant melanoma. Slit2 is known to mediate this effect. Robo4, also known as magic roundabout, is an endothelial specific Robo which, upon binding Slit2, blocks Src family kinase activation, thereby inhibiting VEGF-165-induced migration and permeability in vitro and vascular leak in vivo. This suggests that combined VEGF/Slit2 therapies could be useful in preventing tumor angiogenesis and vascular leak or edema after heart attack or stroke.

=== Horizontal gaze palsy with progressive scoliosis ===
The homozygous Robo3 mutations have been associated with typical ophthalmologic horizontal gaze palsy with progressive scoliosis, which is characterized by oculomotor problems and general disturbances in innervation.

=== Dyslexia ===
Robo1 has been implicated as one of 14 different candidate genes for dyslexia, and one of 10 that fit into a theoretical molecular network involved in neuronal migration and neurite outgrowth. Slit2 is predicted to play a role in the network.
