= Roundabout family =

Roundabout
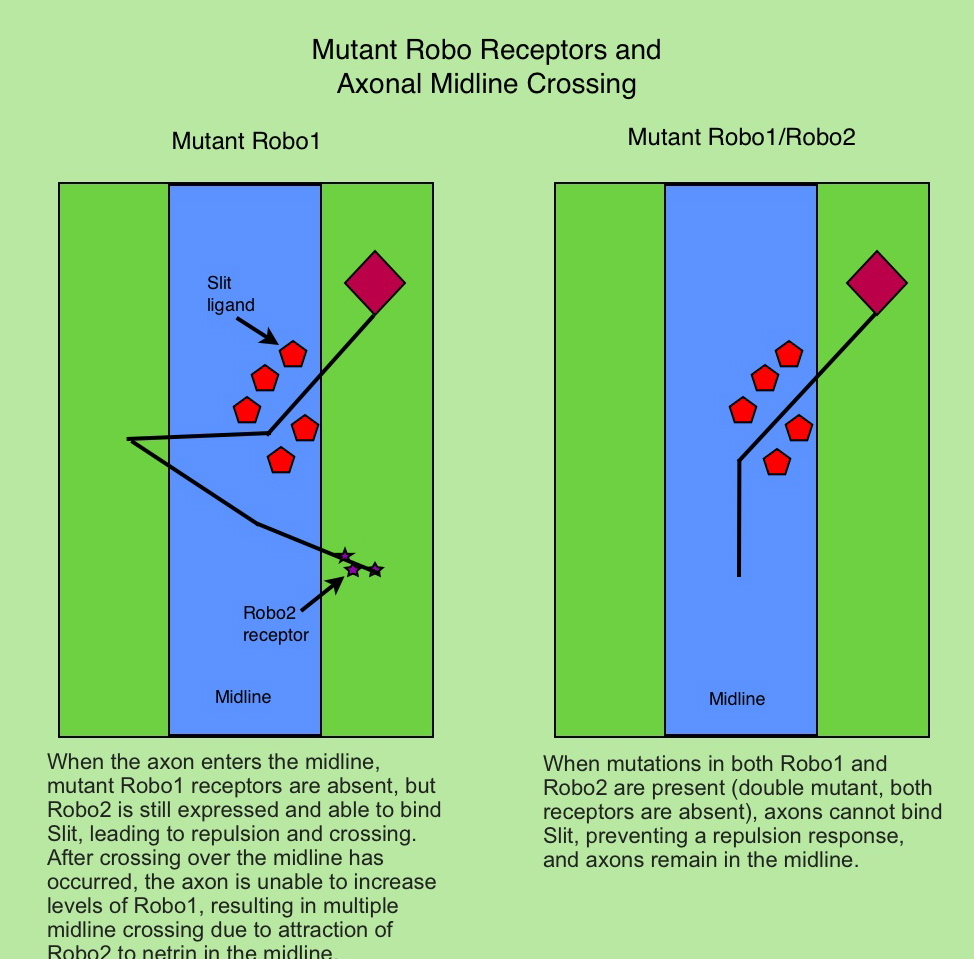
- Mutant Robo Receptors and Axonal Midline Crossing

Identifiers
- Symbol: Roundabout
- Membranome: 21

roundabout

Identifiers
- Organism: Drosophila melanogaster
- Symbol: robo
- Alt. symbols: robo1
- Entrez: 37603
- Orthologs: NCBI: entry; OMA: entry
- RefSeq (mRNA): NM_057551.3
- RefSeq (Prot): NP_476899.1
- UniProt: Q7KVK3

Other data
- Chromosome: 2R: 18.58 - 18.59 Mb
Search for
- Structures: Swiss-model
- Domains: InterPro

leak

Identifiers
- Organism: Drosophila melanogaster
- Symbol: lea
- Alt. symbols: robo2
- Entrez: 44522
- Orthologs: NCBI: entry; OMA: entry
- RefSeq (mRNA): NM_080531.3
- RefSeq (Prot): NP_536792.2
- UniProt: Q9VQ08

Other data
- Chromosome: 2L: 1.37 - 1.43 Mb
Search for
- Structures: Swiss-model
- Domains: InterPro

robo3

Identifiers
- Organism: Drosophila melanogaster
- Symbol: robo3
- Alt. symbols: robo3
- Entrez: 33314
- Orthologs: NCBI: entry; OMA: entry
- RefSeq (mRNA): NM_134748.2
- RefSeq (Prot): NP_608592.2
- UniProt: Q9VPZ7

Other data
- Chromosome: 2L: 1.25 - 1.3 Mb
Search for
- Structures: Swiss-model
- Domains: InterPro

roundabout homolog 1

Identifiers
- Symbol: ROBO1
- NCBI gene: 6091
- HGNC: 10249
- OMIM: 602430
- RefSeq: NM_002941
- UniProt: Q9Y6N7

Other data
- Locus: Chr. 3 p12.3
Search for
- Structures: Swiss-model
- Domains: InterPro

roundabout homolog 2

Identifiers
- Symbol: ROBO2
- NCBI gene: 6092
- HGNC: 10250
- OMIM: 602431
- RefSeq: XM_031246
- UniProt: Q9HCK4

Other data
- Locus: Chr. 3 p12.3
Search for
- Structures: Swiss-model
- Domains: InterPro

roundabout homolog 3

Identifiers
- Symbol: ROBO3
- NCBI gene: 64221
- HGNC: 13433
- OMIM: Q96MS0
- RefSeq: XM_370663
- UniProt: Q96MS0

Other data
- Locus: Chr. 11 q24
Search for
- Structures: Swiss-model
- Domains: InterPro

roundabout homolog 4

Identifiers
- Symbol: ROBO4
- NCBI gene: 54538
- HGNC: 17985
- OMIM: 607528
- RefSeq: NM_019055
- UniProt: Q8WZ75

Other data
- Locus: Chr. 11 q24.2
Search for
- Structures: Swiss-model
- Domains: InterPro

The Roundabout (Robo) family of proteins are single-pass transmembrane receptors that are highly conserved across many branches of the animal kingdom, from C. elegans to humans. They were first discovered in Drosophila, through a mutant screen for genes involved in axon guidance. The Drosophila roundabout mutant was named after its phenotype, which resembled the circular traffic junctions (see roundabout). The Robo receptors are most well known for their role in the development of the nervous system, where they have been shown to respond to secreted Slit ligands. One well-studied example is the requirement for Slit-Robo signaling in regulation of axonal midline crossing. Slit-Robo signaling is also critical for many neurodevelopmental processes including formation of the olfactory tract, the optic nerve, and motor axon fasciculation. In addition, Slit-Robo signaling contributes to cell migration and the development of other tissues such as the lung, kidney, liver, muscle and breast. Mutations in Robo genes have been linked to multiple neurodevelopmental disorders in humans.

== Discovery ==
A large-scale screen of the Drosophila genome for mutants that exhibited axon guidance defects led to the discovery of the roundabout (robo) mutation. In robo mutants, axons were observed to inappropriately cross and recross the midline. It was subsequently found that the secreted protein Slit was the ligand for the Roundabout receptor. Vertebrate Slit proteins were identified shortly after, and were shown to bind both vertebrate and Drosophila Robo receptors and to mediate axonal repulsion of spinal cord explants. It was several more years before a functional analysis of the vertebrate Slit and Robo mutants was performed; this analysis demonstrated that Slit-Robo signaling regulates commissural axon guidance in vertebrates as well. While the vertebrate receptors Robo1 and Robo2 signal repulsion in response to Slit to prevent inappropriate midline crossing, a novel function for Robo3/Rig1 was discovered; unlike the other Robo receptors, it is required to promote midline crossing.

== Evolution of the family members ==
Phylogenetic analysis reveals that all Robo receptors have evolved from a common ancestral protein, with many subsequent diversification events occurring independently in different lineages. The Robo gene was initially identified in Drosophila and has since been cloned in various species including mice and humans. Drosophila have three Robo receptors: Robo1, Robo2, and Robo3. In vertebrates, four Robo receptors have been identified: Robo1, Robo2, Robo3/Rig-1, and Robo4/Magic Roundabout.

== Genes ==
=== Location ===
In humans, Robo1 and Robo2 are located on chromosome 3p12.3, while Robo3 and Robo4 are found on chromosome 11p24.2. In mice, the corresponding Robo genes 1 and 2 are found on chromosome 16 and Robo genes 3 and 4 are located on chromosome 9.

=== Alternative splicing ===
In vertebrates, Robo1 undergoes complex alternative splicing, generating several isoforms including DUTT1, a variant that has been identified as a tumor suppressor gene. Vertebrate Robo3/Rig1 is also alternatively spliced; its two splice products are expressed at different times during commissural axon guidance, and have opposing activities.

== Tissue distribution ==
In humans, Robo1 is expressed generally throughout the central nervous system. Robo2 is enriched in most regions of the adult and fetal brain, as well as in the adult ovary. Intermediate expression of Robo2 is seen in the fetal liver and adult lung, kidney, spleen, testes, and spinal cord. Robo3/Rig1 is found in the hindbrain and spinal cord. Robo4 is expressed in the heart, liver, lungs, kidney, muscle, small intestine, endothelial cells, and largely in the placenta.

== Protein structure ==
Each member of the Robo family has a similar structure, consisting of five immunoglobulin-like domains, three fibronectin type III (FN3) repeats, a transmembrane domain, and a cytoplasmic domain with up to four conserved motifs (CC0-3). In all identified Robo receptors except for vertebrate Robo4, the Ig1 and Ig2 domains have been evolutionarily conserved and are crucial for binding to Slit ligands. Robo4 is unusual as it only contains two Ig and FN3 domains. However, recent research proposes that the vertebrate Slit2 protein can in fact bind to Robo4.

== Function ==
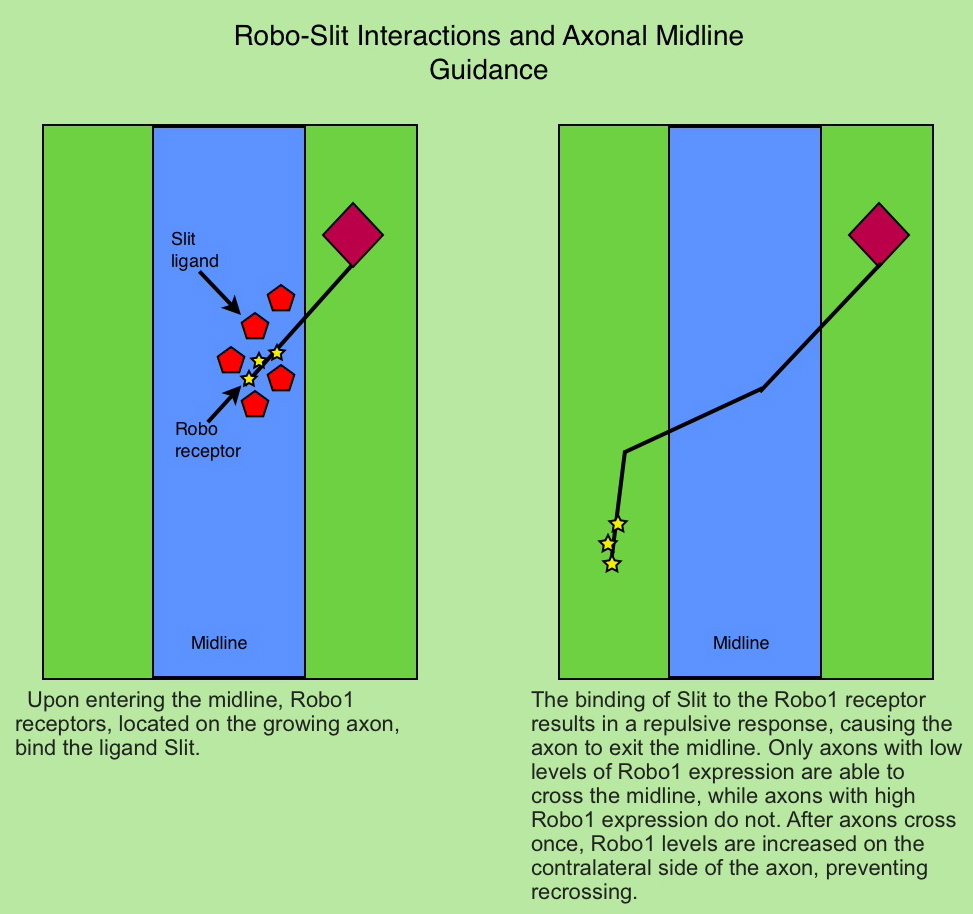
Robo-Slit Interactions and Axonal Midline Guidance

=== Axonal guidance ===
In bilaterian animals, including insects and mammals, most axons in the CNS cross the midline during nervous system development. The Robo proteins are critical regulators of midline crossing across species. In Drosophila embryos, Robo1 and Robo2 are required to keep ipsilaterally projecting axons from inappropriately crossing the midline, and to prevent contralateral axons from remaining stuck at the midline. Robo3, while it also binds Slit, does not appear to play a major role in regulating midline crossing. Instead, it is required for the lateral pathway selection of axons after crossing. Robo2 also contributes to lateral pathway formation.

In the vertebrate spinal cord, Robo1 and Robo2 are expressed on commissural axons and act as repulsive receptors for the Slit ligands expressed by floor plate cells located at the midline. In contrast, Robo3/Rig1 is required for midline crossing, and acts in part by antagonizing Slit-mediated repulsion by Robo1 and Robo2.

Robo receptors have also been shown to be crucial regulators of many other axon pathfinding decisions during development, including the projection of axons in the optic tract and the olfactory epithelium.

=== Guidance of non-neural cells ===
The Robo gene family contributes to the guidance and migration of non-neural cells, including neuronal precursor cells, muscle cells, tracheal cells, Langerhans cells, and vascular smooth muscle cells.

=== Glioma invasion and migration inhibition ===
Robo1 is thought to play a role in the inhibition of glioma invasion and migration. Glioblastoma cells grow away from areas that contain high concentrations of Slit2 and its receptor Robo1, suggesting that the Robo1/Slit2 complex can serve as a chemorepellent for glioma cells, inhibiting the invasion and migration of the tumor cells.

=== Actin cytoskeleton regulation ===
The binding of Slit to Robo receptors leads to reorganization of the actin cytoskeleton. Actin polymerization is regulated by several adaptor proteins that can bind to the cytoplasmic motifs of the Robo receptors. In Drosophila, several signaling proteins downstream of Robo1 have been identified, including Enabled, Son of Sevenless (SOS), Rac, and Dock. It is thought that activation of Robo1 by Slit leads to increased depolymerization of actin, resulting in growth cone collapse. It remains unclear how Drosophila Robo2 and Robo3 signal, although multiple studies suggest that they have distinct signaling capabilities that cannot be recapitulated by Robo1.

=== Midline attraction and Robo3 ===
The vertebrate Robo3/Rig1 homolog is a more distant relative of the Robo gene family, and is thought to play a distinct role in axonal guidance. Robo3/Rig1 is alternatively spliced to generate a protein that inhibits Robo1/2-mediated repulsion, effectively leading to the promotion of midline crossing. The exact mechanism by which Robo3 achieves this anti-repulsive activity is unknown.

== Clinical applications and areas of research ==
=== Angiogenesis and tumor suppression ===
The Robo4 receptor has been linked to angiogenesis in both mice and zebrafish. It is also present in human microvascular endothelial cells (HMVEC) and human umbilical vein endothelial cells (HUVEC). Exposure of Robo4 to Slit2 inhibits angiogenesis. However, exposure to a protein that inhibits Slit2 also inhibits angiogenesis. Due to these inconclusive results, the role of Robo4 in blood vessel growth is not completely understood.

Robo1 has been linked to cancerous tumor growth and suppression. The Slit2/Robo1 pathway has been associated with tumor angiogenesis, leading to subsequent tumor growth. Slit2 proteins have been identified in several varieties of tumors, including melanoma, breast cancer, small cell lung cancer, and bladder cancer. Furthermore, inhibition of the Slit2/Robo1 pathway via R5 and RoboN reduced tumor mass and volume, while also reducing microvessel density. However, Slit2 proteins have not been identified in all kinds of tumors, and other research suggests that Slit-2 expression may suppress tumors in small cell lung cancer and breast cancer.

=== Dyslexia ===
The Robo1 protein is thought to be associated with dyslexia, possibly through chromosomal translocation. The role of Robo1 in regards to dyslexia is not fully understood at this time.

=== Psychopathy ===
Recently, a genome-wide linkage study by Viding and colleagues (2010)reported that the Robo2 gene could be involved in developmental disorders such as psychopathy.

=== Robo3/Rig1 and HGPPS ===
A defect in the Robo3/Rig1 protein results in horizontal gaze palsy with progressive scoliosis (HGPPS), a rare genetic disorder. HGPPS is characterized by a lack of horizontal eye movement within the socket (although vertical movement remains unaffected) and the gradual curvature of the spine throughout development. The disorder is caused by a genetic mutation on chromosome 11, and is autosomal recessive. During normal brain development, Robo3/Rig1 decreases sensitivity of Robo1 to Slit proteins, allowing the axon to grow past the midline. This process allows axons to cross to the other side of the brain, which is crucial for motor function as well as sensory processing. In patients with HGPPS, the absence of Robo3/Rig1 prevents axons in the corticospinal tract and the trochlear nerve from growing past the midline. This abnormal growth of the hindbrain and spinal cord manifests itself as the symptoms associated with HGPPS.
