= Slit (protein) =

Protein family

slit

Identifiers
- Organism: Drosophila melanogaster
- Symbol: sli
- Entrez: 36746
- Orthologs: NCBI: entry; OMA: entry
- RefSeq (mRNA): NM_057381.3
- RefSeq (Prot): NP_476729.1
- UniProt: P24014

Other data
- Chromosome: 2R: 11.75 - 11.82 Mb
Search for
- Structures: Swiss-model
- Domains: InterPro

slit homolog 1

Identifiers
- Symbol: SLIT1
- Alt. symbols: SLIL1
- NCBI gene: 6585
- HGNC: 11085
- OMIM: 603742
- RefSeq: NM_003061
- UniProt: O75093

Other data
- Locus: Chr. 10 q23.3-q24
Search for
- Structures: Swiss-model
- Domains: InterPro

slit homolog 2

Identifiers
- Symbol: SLIT2
- Alt. symbols: SLIL3
- NCBI gene: 9353
- HGNC: 11086
- OMIM: 603746
- RefSeq: NM_004787
- UniProt: O94813

Other data
- Locus: Chr. 4 p15.2
Search for
- Structures: Swiss-model
- Domains: InterPro

slit homolog 3

Identifiers
- Symbol: SLIT3
- Alt. symbols: SLIL2
- NCBI gene: 6586
- HGNC: 11087
- OMIM: 603745
- RefSeq: NM_003062
- UniProt: O75094

Other data
- Locus: Chr. 5 q35
Search for
- Structures: Swiss-model
- Domains: InterPro

Slit is a family of secreted extracellular matrix proteins which play an important signalling role in the neural development of most bilaterians (animals with bilateral symmetry). While invertebrates, including insects and nematode worms, possess a single Slit gene, humans, mice and other vertebrates possess three Slit homologs: Slit1, Slit2 and Slit3. Human Slits have been shown to be involved in certain pathological conditions, such as cancer and inflammation.

The ventral midline of the central nervous system is a key place where axons can either decide to cross and laterally project or stay on the same side of the brain. The main function of Slit proteins is to act as midline repellents, preventing the crossing of longitudinal axons through the midline of the central nervous system of most bilaterian animal species, including mice, chickens, humans, insects, nematode worms and planarians. It also prevents the recrossing of commissural axons. Its canonical receptor is Robo but it may have other receptors. The Slit protein is produced and secreted by cells within the floor plate (in vertebrates) or by midline glia (in insects) and diffuses outward. Slit/Robo signaling is important in pioneer axon guidance.

== Discovery ==
Slit mutations were first discovered in the Nuesslein-Volhard/Wieschaus patterning screen where they were seen to affect the external midline structures in the embryos of Drosophila melanogaster, also known as the common fruit fly. In this experiment, researchers screened for different mutations in D. melanogaster embryos that affected the neural development of axons in the central nervous system. They found that the mutations in commissureless genes (Slit genes) lead to the growth cones that typically cross the midline remaining on their own side. The findings from this screening suggest that Slit genes are responsible for repulsive signaling along the neuronal midline.

== Structure ==
Slit1, Slit2, and Slit3 each have the same basic structure. A major identifying feature of the Slit protein is the four leucine-rich repeat (LRR) domains and the N-terminus. Slits are one of only two protein families that contain multiple LRR domains. These LRRs are followed by six repeats similar to epidermal growth factors (EGF) as well as a β-sandwich domain similar to laminin G. Directly after these sequences, invertebrates have one EGF repeat, whereas vertebrates have three EGF repeats. In each case, the EGF is followed by a C-terminal cystine knot (CT) domain.

It is possible for Slits to be cleaved into fragments of the N-terminus and C-terminus as a result of an assumed proteolytic site between the fifth and sixth EGFs in Drosophila Slit, Caenorhabditis elegans Slit, rat Slit1, rat Slit3 and human Slit2.

=== LRR domains ===
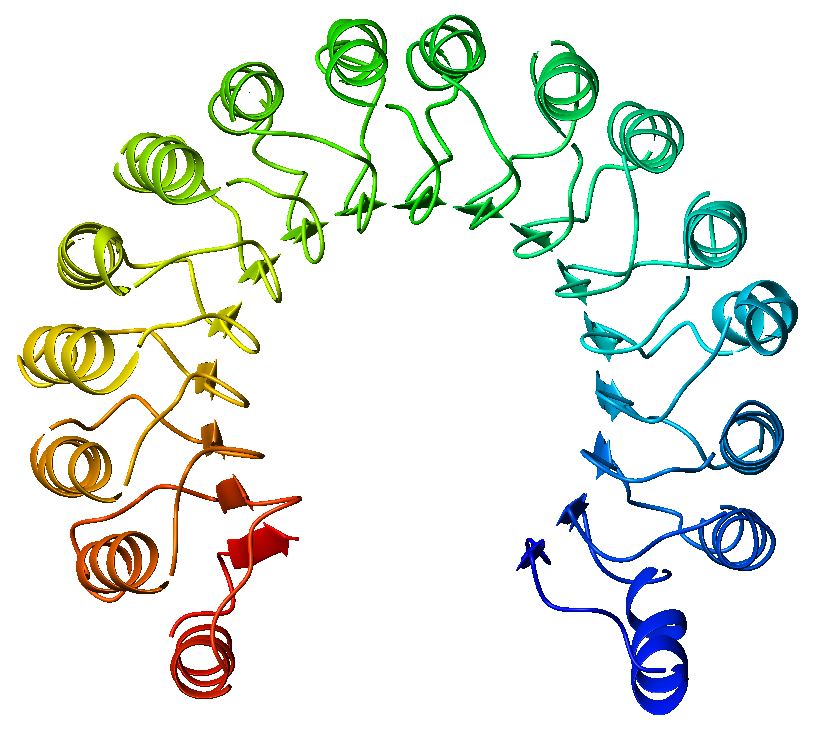
Horseshoe-shaped LRR Domain

Slit LRR domains are thought to assist in controlling neurite outgrowth. The domains consist of five to seven LRRs each with disulfide-rich cap segments. Each LRR motif contains a LXXLXLXXN sequence (where L = leucine, N = asparagine, X = any amino acid) which is one strand to a parallel β-sheet on the concave face of the LRR domain, while the back side of the domain consists of irregular loops. Each of the four domains of Slit are connected by short "linkers" which attach to the domains via a disulfide bridge, allowing the LRR region of Slit to remain very compact.

== Vertebrate homologs ==
Slit1, Slit2, and Slit3 are all a human homologs of the 'Slit' gene found in Drosophila. Each of these genes secretes a protein containing protein-protein interaction regions with leucine-rich repeats and EFGs. Slit2 is mainly expressed in the spinal cord, where it repels motor axons. Slit1 functions in the brain, and Slit3 in the thyroid. Both Slit1 and Slit2 are found in the murine postnatal septum as well as in the neocortex. Further, Slit2 participates in inhibiting leukocyte chemotaxis. In rats, Slit1 was found in the neurons of adult and fetal forebrains. This shows that Slit proteins in mammals most likely contribute to the process of forming and maintaining the endocrine and nervous systems through interactions between proteins. Slit3 is primarily expressed in the thyroid, in human umbilical vein endothelial cells (HUVECs), as well as in endothelial cells from the lung and diaphragm of the mouse. Slit3 interacts with Robo1 and Robo4.

== Function ==
=== Guidance molecules ===
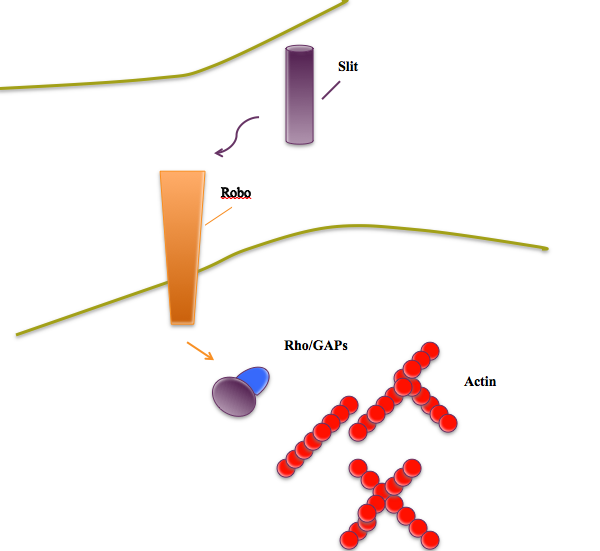
Slit and Robo Interactions

Guidance molecules act as cues by carrying information to receptive cells; administering this information which tells the cell and its entities how to properly align. Slit proteins behave as such when working in axonal guidance during the development of the nervous system. Similarly, these proteins help to orchestrate the development of various networks of tissues throughout the body. This role, also described as cell migration, is the primary role of Slit when interacting with Robo. It is most commonly found acting in neurons, endothelial cells and cancer cells.

=== Axon guidance ===
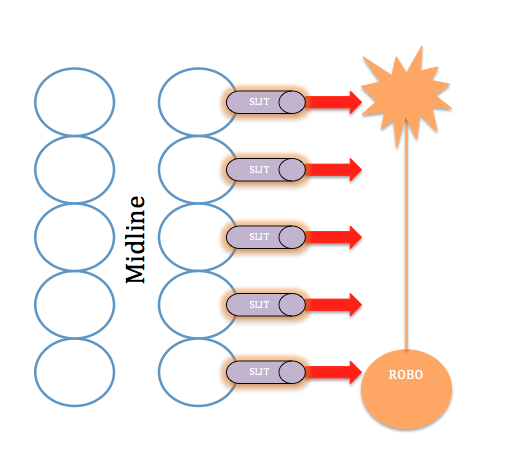
A diagram illustrating the role of Slit in axon guidance: When bound to the cells of the midline, Slit acts by signaling with Robo to repel growing axons away from the midline.

Chemorepellents help to direct growing axons toward the correct regions by directing them away from inappropriate regions. Slit genes, as well as their roundabout receptors, act as chemorepellents by helping prevent the wrong types of axons from crossing the midline of the central nervous system during establishment or remodeling of the neural circuits. The binding of Slit to any member of the Roundabout receptor family results in axon repelling through changes in the axon growth cone. The resulting repelling of axons is collectively termed as axonal guidance. Slit1 and Slit2 have both been seen to collapse and repel olfactory axons. Further evidence suggests that Slit also directs interneurons, particularly acting in the cortex. Positive effects are also correlated with slits. Slit2 begins the formation of axon branches through neural growth factor genes of the dorsal root ganglia.

=== Organogenesis ===
Several studies have shown that the interaction of Slit with its receptors is crucial in regulating the processes involved with the formation of organs. As previously discussed, these interactions play a key role in cell migration. Not surprisingly then, this gene has been found expressed during the development of tightly regulated tissues, such as the heart, lungs, gonads, and ovaries. For example, in early development of the heart tube in Drosophila, Slit and two of its Robo receptors guide migrating cardioblasts and pericardial cells in the dorsal midline. In addition, research on mice has shown that Slit3 and its interaction with Robo1 may be crucial to the development and maturation of lung tissue. Similarly, the expression of Slit3 is upregulated when aligning airway epithelium with endothelium. Due to its regulating function in tissue development, absence or mutations in the expression of these genes can result in abnormalities of these tissues. Several studies in mice and other vertebrates have shown that this deficit results in death almost immediately after birth.

=== Angiogenesis ===
The Slit2 protein has recently been discovered to be associated with the development of new blood vessels from pre-existing vessels, or angiogenesis. Recent research has debated on whether this gene inhibits or stimulates this process. There has been significant proof to conclude that both are true, depending on the context. It has been concluded that the role of Slit in this process depends on which receptor it binds, the cellular context of its target cells, and/or other environmental factors. Slit2 has been implicated in promoting angiogenesis in mice (both in vitro and in vivo), in the human placenta, and in tumorigenesis.

== Clinical importance ==
Because of their part in forebrain development, during which they contribute to axonal guidance and guiding signals in the movement of cortical interneurons, Slit-Robo signal transduction mechanisms could possibly be used in therapy and treatment of neurological disorders and certain types of cancer. Procedures have been found in which Slit genes allow for precise control over vascular guidance cues influencing the organization of blood vessels during development. Slit also plays a large role in angiogenesis. With increased knowledge of this relationship, treatments could be developed for complications with development of embryo vasculature, female reproductive cycling, tumor grown, and metastasis, ischemic cardiovascular diseases, or ocular disorders.

=== Cancer ===
Due to its pivotal role in controlling cell migration, abnormalities or absences in the expression of Slit1, Slit2 and Slit3 are associated with a variety of cancers. In particular, Slit-Robo interaction has been implicated in reproductive and hormone dependent cancers, particularly in females. Under normal function, these genes act as tumor suppressors. Therefore, deletion or lack of expression of these genes is associated with tumorigenesis, particularly tumors within the epithelium of the ovaries, endometrium, and cervix. Samples of surface epithelium in cancer ridden ovaries has exhibited that these cells show decreased expression of Slit2 and Slit3. In addition, absence of these genes allows the migration of cancer cells and thus is associated with increased cancer progression and increased metastasis. The role of this gene and its place in cancer treatment and development is becoming increasingly unraveled but increasingly complex.
