= CXorf58 =

Protein-coding gene in humans

Identifiers
- Aliases: CXorf58, chromosome X open reading frame 58
- External IDs: HomoloGene: 82308; GeneCards: CXorf58; OMA:CXorf58 - orthologs

Gene location (Human)
Chr.	X chromosome (human)
Band	Xp22.11	Start	23,908,006 bp
Band	Xp22.11	End	23,939,509 bp
RNA expression pattern
Bgee	Human / Mouse (ortholog); Top expressed in: testicle; sperm; buccal mucosa cell; left testis; right testis; olfactory zone of nasal mucosa; muscle of thigh; islet of Langerhans; bronchial epithelial cell; right uterine tube / n/a; More reference expression data
BioGPS	n/a
Orthologs
Species	Human	Mouse
Entrez	254158	n/a
Ensembl	ENSG00000165182	n/a
UniProt	Q96LI9	n/a
RefSeq (mRNA)	NM_001169574; NM_152761	n/a
RefSeq (protein)	NP_001163045; NP_689974; NP_001163045.1	n/a
Location (UCSC)	Chr X: 23.91 – 23.94 Mb	n/a
PubMed search		n/a
- Wikidata
View/Edit Human

Human chromosome X open reading frame 58 (CXorf58) is a protein coding gene encoding the CXorf58 protein.

== Gene ==
CXorf58 contains 9 exons. CXorf58 is 31,578 nucleotides long. The longest exon in CXorf58 is exon 1, containing 324 nucleotides and the shortest exon is exon 4, containing 111 nucleotides. CXorf58 is highly expressed in sperm cells, particularly at the lower point of the head and midpiece of spermatids.

== Isoforms ==
There are two isoforms for CXorf58 protein. Isoform 1 for CXorf58 is 332 amino acids long and isoform 2 is 330 amino acids long. Isoform 2 uses an alternate in-frame splice site in the 3' coding region, resulting in a shorter protein.

== Protein ==
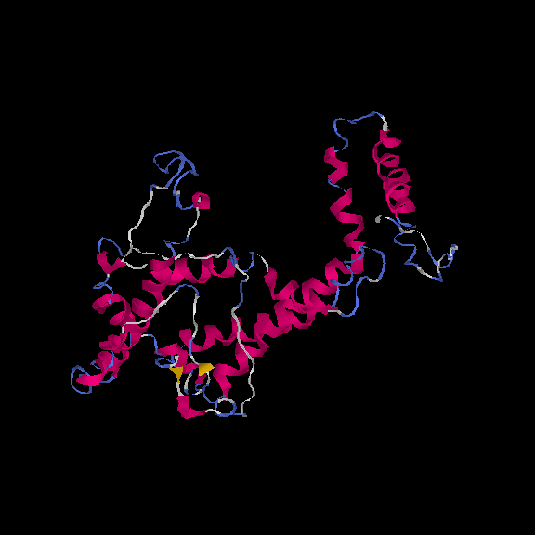
i-Tasser render of CXorf58 Protein tertiary structure

The molecular weight of CXorf58 isoform 1 protein is 38.9kDa. It is rich in basic amino acids and abundant in the amino acids methionine and arginine. CXorf58 contains 3 asparagine-linked glycosylation sites and 5 phosphorylation sites.

== Gene level regulation ==
CXorf58 contains a tissue-specific expression pattern. It is found in high abundance in the testis.

== Protein level regulation ==
CXorf58 is localized in the cytoplasm of cells. CXorf58 contains 10 net phosphorylation sites. There is one glycosylation site for CXorf58 at amino acid 320.

== Homology ==
Orthologs of CXorf58 appear in an array of taxonomic groups.

Species	Common name	NCBI Accession Number	Sequence length (amino acids)	Date of Divergence (MYA)	Sequence identity (%)	Sequence similarity (%)
Homo sapiens	Human	XP_054182731.1	332	-	-	-
Gorilla gorilla gorilla	Western lowland gorilla	XP_004063966.2	332	8.6	99%	99%
Sciurus carolinensis	Eastern gray squirrel	XP_047392635.1	370	87	62%	69%
Mus Musculus	House mouse	NP_001349810.1	368	87	56%	65%
Equus quagga	Plains zebra	XP_046529678.1	374	94	64%	71%
Panthera uncia	Snow leopard	XP_049499554.1	380	94	64%	66%
Cervus canadensis	Elk	XP_043314584.1	372	94	63%	69%
Bos taurus	Cattle	XP_024843724.1	370	94	63%	68%
Struthio camelus australis	South African ostrich	XP_009663695.1	342	319	49%	54%
Dromaius novaehollandiae	Emu	XP_025959174.1	334	319	48%	53%
Nothoprocta perdicaria	Chilean tinamou	XP_025894453.1	332	319	47%	51%
Chrysemys picta bellii	Painted turtle	XP_065435515.1	408	319	48%	53%
Chelonia mydas	Green sea turtle	XP_037757767.1	353	319	48%	54%
Danio rerio	Zebrafish	XP_021332053.1	253	429	44%	65%
Asterias rubens	Common starfish	XP_033637843.1	404	619	44%	53%
Saccoglossus kowalevskii	Acorn worm	XP_002736551.1	390	619	44%	53%
Ruditapes philippinarum	Manila clam	XP_060606373.1	446	686	45%	42%
Lineus longissimus	Bootlace worm	XP_064639061.1	393	686	45%	52%
Liolophura japonica	Chiton liolophura japonica	XP_064615141.1	435	686	45%	45%
Patella vulgata	Common limpet	XP_050389200.1	434	686	41%	45%

== Interacting proteins ==
Five proteins have interactions with CXorf58: GDE1, H2BC9, HOXA1, TGFBR2, and DCAF5.

Protein	Protein Full Name	Function
GDE1	Glycerophosphodiester Phosphodiesterase 1	Enables glycerophosphodiester phosphodiesterase activity, glycerophosphoinositol glycerophosphodiesterase activity, and lysophospholipase activity.
H2BC9	H2B Clustered Histone 9	Encodes a replication-dependent histone that is a member of the histone H2B family.
HOXA1	Homeobox A1	Encodes a DNA-binding transcription factor which may regulate gene expression, morphogenesis, and differentiation.
TGFBR2	Transforming Growth Factor Beta Receptor 2	Forms a heterodimeric complex with TGF-beta receptor type-1, and binds TGF-beta.
DCAF5	DDB1 and CUL4 Associated Factor 5	Involved in protein ubiquitination.

== Clinical significance ==
Mutations that occur on CXorf58 include deletions of base pairs, missense mutations, nonsense mutations, and frameshift mutations. Many of which are coding sequence variants.
