= Athabaskan brainstem dysgenesis syndrome =

- Other names: Athabascan brainstem dysgenesis syndrome, ABDS
- Athabaskan brainstem dysgenesis syndrome is an autosomal recessive disorder.
- Specialty: Medical genetics

Athabaskan brainstem dysgenesis syndrome (ABDS) or Athabascan brainstem dysgenesis syndrome is an extremely rare genetic condition that affects the central nervous system's brainstem. It is characterized by a variety of varied traits, such as facial paresis, sensorineural deafness, congenital horizontal gaze palsy, central hypoventilation, and developmental delay.

== Signs and symptoms ==
Symptoms of Athabaskan brainstem dysgenesis syndrome include developmental delay, central hypoventilation, sensorineural deafness, congenital horizontal gaze palsy, and additional variable characteristics, such as facial paresis.

== Causes ==
It has been established that HOXA1 deficiency, which disrupts normal motor neuron development and results in loss of normal brainstem function, is the genetic etiology of Athabaskan brainstem dysgenesis syndrome. It has been discovered that two loss-of-function non-sense mutations in the HOXA1 gene, which result in a shortened protein product, are homozygous in patients with Athabaskan brainstem dysgenesis syndrome.

== Diagnosis ==
The diagnostic criteria for Athabaskan brainstem dysgenesis syndrome include:

1. Verification of sensorineural deafness by brainstem auditory evoked responses.
2. Upon conjugate lateral gazing, there is horizontal gaze palsy; however, the medial gaze remains intact with convergence.
3. Central hypoventilation shown by hypoxia and/or respiratory acidosis without an underlying neuromuscular or lung disease.
4. Developmental delays.
5. Either cardiac outflow tract abnormalities, seizures, vocal cord paresis, or facial paresis.

== Treatment ==
Treatment includes mechanical ventilation and supplemental oxygen.

== See also ==
- Moebius syndrome
- List of genetic disorders
