= Horizontal gaze palsy =

- Specialty: Neurology

A horizontal gaze palsy is a subtype of gaze palsy in which conjugate, horizontal eye movements are limited by neurologic deficits. Horizontal gaze palsies typically result from an ipsilateral pontine lesion or a contralateral frontal lobe lesion.

== Presentation ==
Individuals suffering from complete horizontal gaze palsy cannot move either eye past the midline in a single direction. The eyes of a patient with pontine lesions involving the sixth nerve nucleus or PPRF may stray from the lesion's side. Patients with a left pontine lesion will be unable to look to their left and may have their eyes deviated to the right at baseline. If there is only partial damage to the pontine structures, patients may exhibit partial horizontal gaze movement. Patients with horizontal gaze palsy may also have to turn their heads toward the affected side to focus on an object that is directly in front of them because their eyes are constantly shifted to the opposite side.

Lesions in the frontal lobe can hinder ipsilateral horizontal smooth pursuit, while lesions in the parietal-occipital-temporal region or posterior parietal cortex reduce the amplitude and speed of smooth pursuit eye movements in the direction of the lesion.

== Causes ==
A common cause of horizontal gaze palsies are strokes involving pontine structures, abducens nerve, or the motor cortex. Horizontal gaze palsy has also been reported in cases of metastasis, hemorrhage, neuromyelitis optica spectrum disorder, and multiple sclerosis.

Rarely is horizontal gaze palsy reported in isolation; it may be classified as type III Duane syndrome. Mobius syndrome is characterized by facial weakness and horizontal gaze palsy. Horizontal gaze palsies have also been described in certain genetic conditions involving heterozygous mutations of the ROBO3 gene, resulting in the rare condition known as "Horizontal gaze palsy and progressive scoliosis."

== Anatomy ==
Eye movements are controlled by supranucelar communication, infranuclear communication, and ocular motor nuclei. Horizontal gaze specifically also involves the Abducens nerve and the Paramedian pontine reticular formation. Horizontal gaze involves synchronous activation of the abducens muscle of one eye and the medial rectus muscle of the other, via communication through the Medial longitudinal fasciculus. Horizontal gaze palsies can be caused by a lesion affecting any structure in these pathways. Lesions to abducens nucleus or PPRF typically create an ipsilateral gaze palsy, while lesions to MLF typically cause Internuclear ophthalmoplegia, a type of horizontal gaze palsy in which the affected eye cannot adduct in conjugation with the contralateral eye during horizontal gaze, but convergence is preserved. Lesions to both PPRF and MLF can result in a rare condition known as One and a half syndrome, where a patient will have complete loss of lateral movement in one eye as well as a unilateral horizontal gaze palsy.

== Diagnosis ==
Pontine lesions can typically be distinguished from supranuclear lesions in the frontal lobe based on clinical neurologic findings. Gaze palsies secondary to frontal lobe lesions can be temporarily relieved with rapid, passive horizontal head rotation, which also directly stimulates the sixth nerve nucleus through the vestibuloocular reflex. During this maneuver in a patient with intact brainstem structures, the eyes will gaze to the opposite direction of the head movement. However, gaze palsies secondary to pontine nuclear and infranuclear lesions cannot be clinically alleviated. This passive head rotation maneuver is testing the oculocephalic reflex, sometimes referred to as the Doll's Eye reflex.

The dorsal pons should be carefully considered when conducting neuroimaging studies. MRIs, or magnetic resonance imaging, are typically the preferred method. Computed tomography (CT) is a suitable substitute for magnetic resonance imaging (MRI) in certain situations, such as acute patients, patients with altered consciousness, or patients for whom MRI is contraindicated (such as pacemaker patients).

When a patient exhibits intermittent conjugate gaze deviation or clinical seizure activity or is comatose or obtunded, an electroencephalogram (EEG) should be performed to rule out a seizure disorder.

== See also ==
- Conjugate gaze palsy
- Scoliosis
- One and a half syndrome
- Internuclear ophthalmoplegia
