= Homeobox A1 =

Protein-coding gene in humans

HOXA1

Identifiers
- Aliases: HOXA1, BSAS, HOX1, HOX1F, Homeobox A1
- External IDs: OMIM: 142955; MGI: 96170; GeneCards: HOXA1

Gene location (Human)
Chr.	Chromosome 7 (human)
Band	7p15.2	Start	27,092,993 bp
Band	7p15.2	End	27,096,000 bp

Gene location (Mouse)
Chr.	Chromosome 6 (mouse)
Band	6 B3|6 25.4 cM	Start	52,132,570 bp
Band	6 B3|6 25.4 cM	End	52,135,297 bp
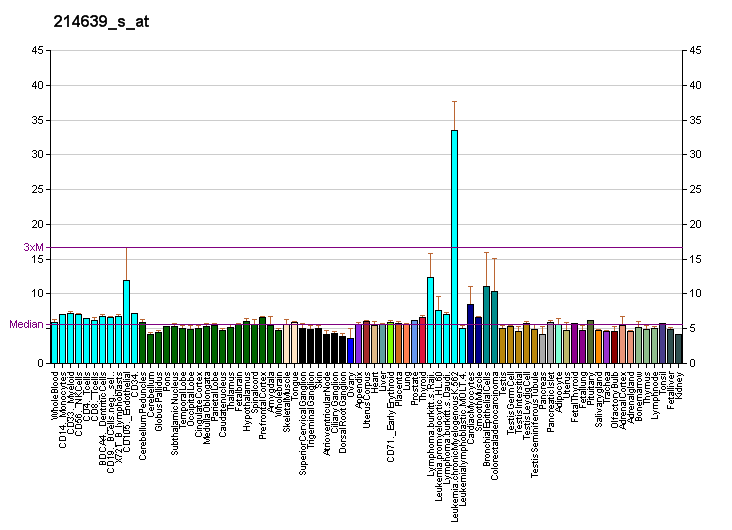
RNA expression pattern
Bgee	Human / Mouse (ortholog); Top expressed in: secondary oocyte; hair follicle; testicle; mucosa of transverse colon; germinal epithelium; granulocyte; urinary bladder; mucosa of sigmoid colon; parietal pleura; metanephros / Top expressed in: primitive streak; somite; tail of embryo; embryo; condyle; embryo; endothelial cell of lymphatic vessel; fossa; abdominal wall; morula; More reference expression data
BioGPS	More reference expression data
Gene ontology
Molecular function	DNA binding; protein binding; identical protein binding; DNA-binding transcription activator activity, RNA polymerase II-specific; sequence-specific DNA binding; DNA-binding transcription factor activity, RNA polymerase II-specific
Cellular component	nucleus
Biological process	cochlea development; abducens nerve formation; regulation of behavior; regulation of transcription, DNA-templated; cognition; embryonic neurocranium morphogenesis; anatomical structure morphogenesis; outer ear morphogenesis; hearing; optokinetic behavior; transcription, DNA-templated; semicircular canal formation; multicellular organism development; neuromuscular process; cochlea morphogenesis; artery morphogenesis; artery development; inner ear development; transcription by RNA polymerase II; positive regulation of transcription by RNA polymerase II
Sources:Amigo / QuickGO
Orthologs
Databases	NCBI: entry; OMA: entry
Species	Human	Mouse
Entrez	3198	15394
Ensembl	ENSG00000105991	ENSMUSG00000029844
UniProt	P49639	P09022
RefSeq (mRNA)	NM_153620; NM_005522	NM_010449; NM_001311118
RefSeq (protein)	NP_005513; NP_705873	n/a
Location (UCSC)	Chr 7: 27.09 – 27.1 Mb	Chr 6: 52.13 – 52.14 Mb
PubMed search
- Wikidata
View/Edit Human	View/Edit Mouse

Homeobox protein Hox-A1 is a protein that in humans is encoded by the HOXA1 gene.

== Gene ==
Two transcript variants encoding two different isoforms have been found for this gene, with only one of the isoforms containing the homeodomain region.

== Function ==
In vertebrates, the genes encoding the class of transcription factors called homeobox genes are found in clusters named A, B, C, and D on four separate chromosomes. Expression of these proteins is spatially and temporally regulated during embryonic development. This gene is part of the A cluster on chromosome 7 and encodes a DNA-binding transcription factor which may regulate gene expression, morphogenesis, and cellular differentiation. The homeobox protein Hox-A1 may be involved in the placement of hindbrain segments in the proper location along the anterior-posterior axis during development.

== Clinical significance ==
A common polymorphism in the HOXA1 gene is associated with a susceptibility to autism spectrum disorder, with individuals possessing these gene variant have an approximately doubled risk of developing the disorder. Studies on knockout mice have indicated that the gene can alter embryological development of the brain stem (specifically the facial and superior olivary nuclei), as well as induce several other physical changes such as in ear shape. Both of these sets of changes can also be seen in patients with autism.

Other HOXA1 mutations are associated with Bosley-Salih-Alorainy syndrome (BSAS) or the Athabaskan brainstem dysgenesis syndrome (ABDS).

== Regulation ==
The HOXA1 gene is repressed by the microRNA miR-10a.

== See also ==
- Homeobox
