= HIST1H2BH =

Protein-coding gene in the species Homo sapiens

H2BC9

Identifiers
- Aliases: H2BC9, H2B/j, H2BFJ, histone cluster 1, H2bh, histone cluster 1 H2B family member h, HIST1H2BH, H2B clustered histone 9
- External IDs: OMIM: 602806; MGI: 3710645; GeneCards: H2BC9

Gene location (Human)
Chr.	Chromosome 6 (human)
Band	6p22.2	Start	26,251,614 bp
Band	6p22.2	End	26,252,075 bp

Gene location (Mouse)
Chr.	Chromosome 13 (mouse)
Band	13|13 A3.1	Start	22,017,913 bp
Band	13|13 A3.1	End	22,021,700 bp
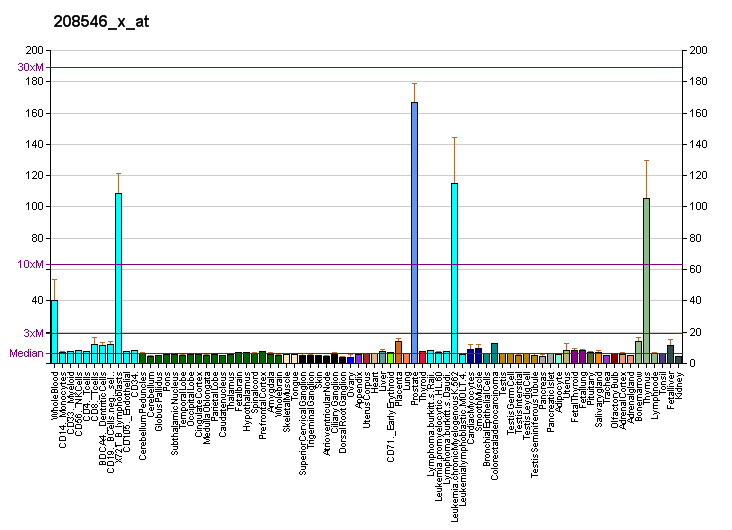
RNA expression pattern
Bgee	Human / Mouse (ortholog); Top expressed in: bone marrow cell; monocyte; jejunal mucosa; mucosa of transverse colon; right ventricle; thymus; bronchial epithelial cell; embryo; cartilage tissue; mucosa of sigmoid colon / Top expressed in: granulocyte; embryo; genital tubercle; tail of embryo; bone marrow; zygote; mesencephalon; esophagus; ileum; conceptus; More reference expression data
BioGPS	More reference expression data
Gene ontology
Molecular function	DNA binding; protein heterodimerization activity; protein binding; enzyme binding; ubiquitin-like protein ligase binding; STAT family protein binding
Cellular component	chromosome; nucleosome; extracellular exosome; nucleus; nucleoplasm; cytosol; protein-containing complex
Biological process	nucleosome assembly; protein ubiquitination
Sources:Amigo / QuickGO
Orthologs
Databases	NCBI: entry; OMA: entry
Species	Human	Mouse
Entrez	8345	665622
Ensembl	ENSG00000275713	ENSMUSG00000069303
UniProt	Q93079	P10853
RefSeq (mRNA)	NM_003524	NM_001110555; NM_001313878
RefSeq (protein)	NP_003515	NP_835505; NP_001091448; NP_001300809; NP_001104025; NP_001300807 NP_835502; NP_835506; NP_835508
Location (UCSC)	Chr 6: 26.25 – 26.25 Mb	Chr 13: 22.02 – 22.02 Mb
PubMed search
- Wikidata
View/Edit Human	View/Edit Mouse

Histone H2B type 1-H is a protein that in humans is encoded by the HIST1H2BH gene.

Histones are basic nuclear proteins that are responsible for the nucleosome structure of the chromosomal fiber in eukaryotes. Two molecules of each of the four core histones (H2A, H2B, H3, and H4) form an octamer, around which approximately 146 bp of DNA is wrapped in repeating units, called nucleosomes. The linker histone, H1, interacts with linker DNA between nucleosomes and functions in the compaction of chromatin into higher order structures. This gene is intronless and encodes a member of the histone H2B family. Transcripts from this gene lack polyA tails but instead contain a palindromic termination element. This gene is found in the large histone gene cluster on chromosome 6.
