= SLIT3 =

Protein-coding gene in the species Homo sapiens

Identifiers
- Aliases: SLIT3, MEGF5, SLIL2, SLIT1, Slit-3, slit2, slit guidance ligand 3
- External IDs: OMIM: 603745; MGI: 1315202; HomoloGene: 2303; GeneCards: SLIT3; OMA:SLIT3 - orthologs

Gene location (Human)
Chr.	Chromosome 5 (human)
Band	5q34-q35.1	Start	168,661,733 bp
Band	5q34-q35.1	End	169,301,139 bp

Gene location (Mouse)
Chr.	Chromosome 11 (mouse)
Band	11|11 A4	Start	35,012,051 bp
Band	11|11 A4	End	35,599,334 bp
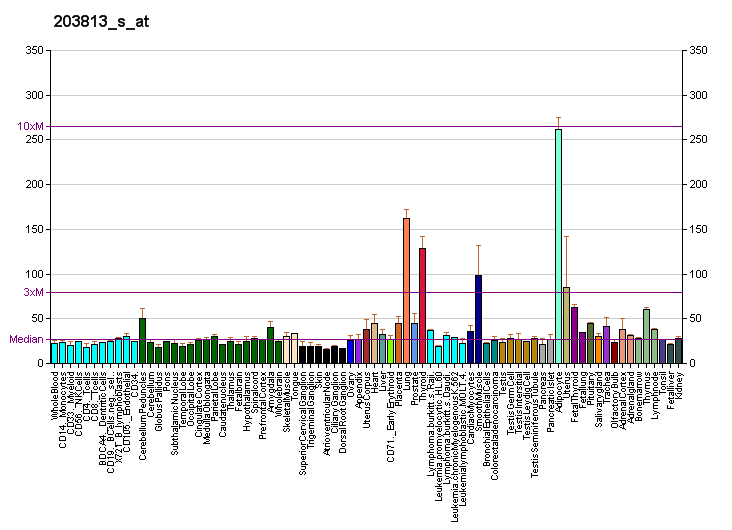
RNA expression pattern
Bgee	Human / Mouse (ortholog); Top expressed in: right coronary artery; popliteal artery; tibial arteries; saphenous vein; gallbladder; cardiac muscle tissue of right atrium; vena cava; subcutaneous adipose tissue; left coronary artery; right auricle of heart / Top expressed in: umbilical cord; gastrula; genital tubercle; paramesonephric duct; ascending aorta; tail of embryo; lip; superior cervical ganglion; skin of external ear; cardiac muscle tissue of atrium; More reference expression data
BioGPS	More reference expression data
Gene ontology
Molecular function	Roundabout binding; calcium ion binding; heparin binding
Cellular component	extracellular region; mitochondrion; extracellular space
Biological process	negative regulation of chemokine-mediated signaling pathway; chemorepulsion involved in embryonic olfactory bulb interneuron precursor migration; cell differentiation; negative chemotaxis; Roundabout signaling pathway; negative regulation of gene expression; nervous system development; multicellular organism development; cellular response to hormone stimulus; negative regulation of cell growth; response to cortisol; apoptotic process involved in luteolysis; animal organ morphogenesis; axon extension involved in axon guidance; negative regulation of cell population proliferation; axon guidance; aortic valve morphogenesis; atrioventricular valve morphogenesis; ventricular septum morphogenesis
Sources:Amigo / QuickGO
Orthologs
Species	Human	Mouse
Entrez	6586	20564
Ensembl	ENSG00000184347	ENSMUSG00000056427
UniProt	O75094	Q9WVB4
RefSeq (mRNA)	NM_003062; NM_001271946	NM_011412
RefSeq (protein)	NP_001258875; NP_003053	NP_035542
Location (UCSC)	Chr 5: 168.66 – 169.3 Mb	Chr 11: 35.01 – 35.6 Mb
PubMed search
- Wikidata
View/Edit Human	View/Edit Mouse

Slit homolog 3 protein is a protein that in humans is encoded by the SLIT3 gene.
