= ROBO2 =

Protein-coding gene in the species Homo sapiens

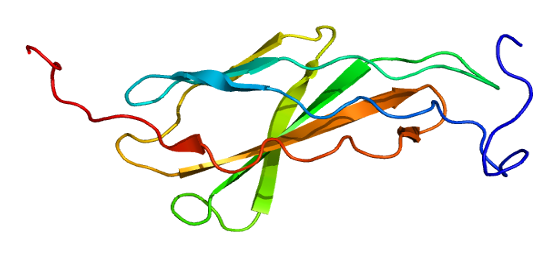

Identifiers
- Aliases: ROBO2, SAX3, roundabout guidance receptor 2
- External IDs: OMIM: 602431; MGI: 1890110; GeneCards: ROBO2
Available structures
PDB	Ortholog search: PDBe RCSB
PDB	List of PDB id codes 1UEM, 1UJT, 2EDJ

Gene location (Human)
Chr.	Chromosome 3 (human)
Band	3p12.3	Start	75,906,695 bp
Band	3p12.3	End	77,649,964 bp

Gene location (Mouse)
Chr.	Chromosome 16 (mouse)
Band	16|16 C3.1	Start	73,688,727 bp
Band	16|16 C3.1	End	74,208,713 bp
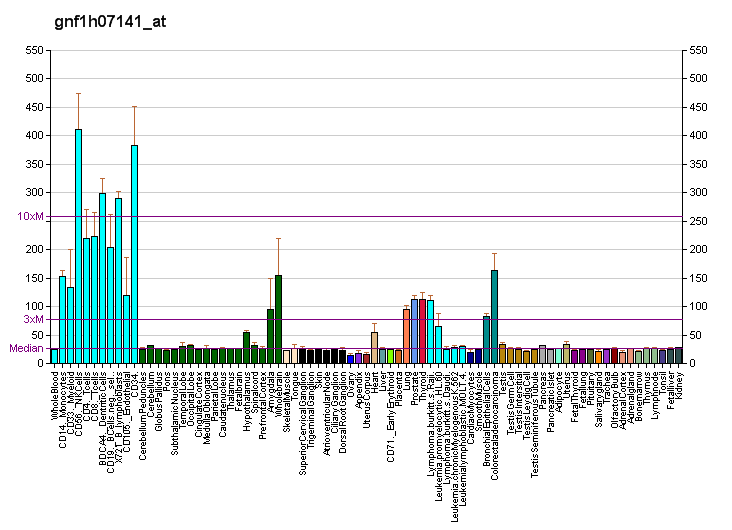
RNA expression pattern
Bgee	Human / Mouse (ortholog); Top expressed in: ganglionic eminence; ventricular zone; buccal mucosa cell; prefrontal cortex; islet of Langerhans; cartilage tissue; Brodmann area 46; pons; endothelial cell; gonad / Top expressed in: Rostral migratory stream; hand; genital tubercle; dentate gyrus of hippocampal formation granule cell; superior frontal gyrus; neural layer of retina; ganglionic eminence; primary visual cortex; olfactory bulb; superior colliculus; More reference expression data
BioGPS	More reference expression data
Gene ontology
Molecular function	protein binding; identical protein binding; axon guidance receptor activity
Cellular component	integral component of membrane; membrane; cell surface; axolemma; extracellular exosome; plasma membrane
Biological process	cell differentiation; ureteric bud development; kidney development; negative regulation of synapse assembly; Roundabout signaling pathway; positive regulation of axonogenesis; nervous system development; multicellular organism development; chemotaxis; central nervous system development; cellular response to hormone stimulus; olfactory bulb interneuron development; apoptotic process involved in luteolysis; negative regulation of negative chemotaxis; axon midline choice point recognition; metanephros development; homophilic cell adhesion via plasma membrane adhesion molecules; retinal ganglion cell axon guidance; brain development; spinal cord development; axon guidance; outflow tract septum morphogenesis; aortic valve morphogenesis; pulmonary valve morphogenesis; endocardial cushion formation; positive regulation of Notch signaling pathway involved in heart induction; aorta development; ventricular septum morphogenesis
Sources:Amigo / QuickGO
Orthologs
Databases	NCBI: entry; OMA: entry
Species	Human	Mouse
Entrez	6092	268902
Ensembl	ENSG00000185008	ENSMUSG00000052516
UniProt	Q9HCK4	Q7TPD3
RefSeq (mRNA)	NM_001128929; NM_001290039; NM_001290040; NM_001290065; NM_002942 NM_001378190; NM_001378191; NM_001378192; NM_001378193; NM_001378194; NM_001378195; NM_001378196; NM_001378197; NM_001378198; NM_001378199; NM_001378200; NM_001378201; NM_001378202; NM_001378203; NM_001394212; NM_001394213; NM_001394214; NM_001395656; NM_001395657	NM_175549; NM_001358490; NM_001358491; NM_001358492; NM_001358493 NM_001358494
RefSeq (protein)	NP_001122401; NP_001276968; NP_001276969; NP_001276994; NP_002933 NP_001365119; NP_001365120; NP_001365121; NP_001365122; NP_001365123; NP_001365124; NP_001365125; NP_001365126; NP_001365127; NP_001365128; NP_001365129; NP_001365130; NP_001365131; NP_001365132	n/a
Location (UCSC)	Chr 3: 75.91 – 77.65 Mb	Chr 16: 73.69 – 74.21 Mb
PubMed search
- Wikidata
View/Edit Human	View/Edit Mouse

Roundabout homolog 2 is a protein that in humans is encoded by the ROBO2 gene.
