= SLIT1 =

Mammalian protein found in Homo sapiens

Identifiers
- Aliases: SLIT1, MEGF4, SLIL1, SLIT-1, SLIT3, slit guidance ligand 1
- External IDs: OMIM: 603742; MGI: 1315203; HomoloGene: 2302; GeneCards: SLIT1; OMA:SLIT1 - orthologs

Gene location (Human)
Chr.	Chromosome 10 (human)
Band	10q24.1	Start	96,998,038 bp
Band	10q24.1	End	97,185,959 bp

Gene location (Mouse)
Chr.	Chromosome 19 (mouse)
Band	19|19 C3	Start	41,588,696 bp
Band	19|19 C3	End	41,732,104 bp
RNA expression pattern
Bgee	Human / Mouse (ortholog); Top expressed in: middle temporal gyrus; orbitofrontal cortex; Region I of hippocampus proper; Brodmann area 10; Brodmann area 23; Brodmann area 46; entorhinal cortex; superior frontal gyrus; pancreatic ductal cell; frontal pole / Top expressed in: dentate gyrus of hippocampal formation granule cell; primary visual cortex; superior frontal gyrus; urethra; male urethra; hippocampus proper; stellate reticulum; enamel knot; ventricular zone; Rostral migratory stream; More reference expression data
BioGPS	n/a
Gene ontology
Molecular function	calcium ion binding; Roundabout binding; heparin binding
Cellular component	extracellular region; extracellular space; intracellular anatomical structure
Biological process	chemorepulsion involved in embryonic olfactory bulb interneuron precursor migration; cell differentiation; neuron projection morphogenesis; dorsal/ventral axon guidance; negative chemotaxis; axonogenesis; negative regulation of synapse assembly; nervous system development; telencephalon cell migration; multicellular organism development; forebrain morphogenesis; tangential migration from the subventricular zone to the olfactory bulb; olfactory bulb development; motor neuron axon guidance; axon extension involved in axon guidance; retinal ganglion cell axon guidance; axon guidance; nuclear migration
Sources:Amigo / QuickGO
Orthologs
Species	Human	Mouse
Entrez	6585	20562
Ensembl	ENSG00000187122	ENSMUSG00000025020
UniProt	O75093	Q80TR4
RefSeq (mRNA)	NM_003061	NM_015748
RefSeq (protein)	NP_003052	NP_056563
Location (UCSC)	Chr 10: 97 – 97.19 Mb	Chr 19: 41.59 – 41.73 Mb
PubMed search
- Wikidata
View/Edit Human	View/Edit Mouse

Slit homolog 1 protein is a protein that in humans is encoded by the SLIT1 gene.
