= ROBO1 =

Protein-coding gene in the species Homo sapiens

Identifiers
- Aliases: ROBO1, DUTT1, SAX3, roundabout guidance receptor 1
- External IDs: OMIM: 602430; MGI: 1274781; GeneCards: ROBO1
Available structures
| PDB | Ortholog search: PDBe RCSB |
| PDB | List of PDB id codes 2EO9, 2V9Q, 2V9T, 4HLJ |

Gene location (Human)
| Chr. | Chromosome 3 (human) |
| Band | 3p12.3 | Start | 78,597,239 bp |
| Band | 3p12.3 | End | 79,767,998 bp |

Gene location (Mouse)
| Chr. | Chromosome 16 (mouse) |
| Band | 16|16 C3.1 | Start | 72,105,194 bp |
| Band | 16|16 C3.1 | End | 72,842,983 bp |
RNA expression pattern
| Bgee | Human / Mouse (ortholog); Top expressed in: ventricular zone; ganglionic eminence; tibia; human penis; Achilles tendon; periodontal fiber; gingival epithelium; lateral nuclear group of thalamus; skin of hip; urethra / Top expressed in: genital tubercle; cumulus cell; Gonadal ridge; habenula; vestibular membrane of cochlear duct; hair follicle; olfactory tubercle; maxillary prominence; left lung lobe; migratory enteric neural crest cell; More reference expression data |
| BioGPS | n/a |
Gene ontology
| Molecular function | LRR domain binding; protein binding; identical protein binding; axon guidance receptor activity |
| Cellular component | cytoplasm; integral component of membrane; cell projection; membrane; integral component of plasma membrane; cell surface; axon; plasma membrane; endoplasmic reticulum-Golgi intermediate compartment membrane |
| Biological process | positive regulation of Rho protein signal transduction; negative regulation of chemokine-mediated signaling pathway; cell differentiation; negative regulation of mammary gland epithelial cell proliferation; Roundabout signaling pathway; positive regulation of axonogenesis; nervous system development; cell migration involved in sprouting angiogenesis; axon guidance; multicellular organism development; chemotaxis; development of the heart; cell adhesion; negative regulation of cell migration; negative regulation of negative chemotaxis; axon midline choice point recognition; activation of cysteine-type endopeptidase activity involved in apoptotic process; chemorepulsion involved in postnatal olfactory bulb interneuron migration; homophilic cell adhesion via plasma membrane adhesion molecules; positive regulation of MAP kinase activity; positive regulation of vascular endothelial growth factor signaling pathway; outflow tract septum morphogenesis; aortic valve morphogenesis; pulmonary valve morphogenesis; endocardial cushion formation; positive regulation of gene expression; negative regulation of gene expression; positive regulation of Notch signaling pathway involved in heart induction; aorta development; ventricular septum morphogenesis |
Sources:Amigo / QuickGO
Orthologs
| Databases | NCBI: entry; OMA: entry |
| Species | Human | Mouse |
| Entrez | 6091 | 19876 |
| Ensembl | ENSG00000169855 | ENSMUSG00000022883 |
| UniProt | Q9Y6N7 | O89026 |
| RefSeq (mRNA) | NM_001145845; NM_002941; NM_133631 | NM_019413 |
| RefSeq (protein) | NP_001139317; NP_002932; NP_598334 | NP_062286 |
| Location (UCSC) | Chr 3: 78.6 – 79.77 Mb | Chr 16: 72.11 – 72.84 Mb |
| PubMed search |
- Wikidata
| View/Edit Human | View/Edit Mouse |

Roundabout homolog 1 is a protein that in humans is encoded by the ROBO1 gene.

== Function ==
Bilateral symmetric nervous systems have special midline structures that establish a partition between the two mirror image halves. Some axons project toward and across the midline in response to long-range chemoattractants emanating from the midline. The protein encoded by ROBO1 is structurally similar to a Drosophila integral membrane protein which is encoded by the Drosophila roundabout gene (a member of the immunoglobulin gene superfamily) and is both an axon guidance receptor and a cell adhesion receptor, known to be involved in the decision by axons to cross the central nervous system midline. Two transcript variants encoding different isoforms have been found for ROBO1.

== Clinical significance ==
ROBO1 was implicated in a communication disorder based on a Finnish pedigree with severe dyslexia. Analyses revealed a translocation had occurred disrupting ROBO1. Study of the phonological memory component of the language acquisition system suggests that ROBO1 polymorphisms are associated with functioning in this system. The gene is thought to be related to the brain's ability to represent quantities, and is correlated with better math scores of young children in one limited study.
