= ROBO4 =

Protein-coding gene in the species Homo sapiens

Identifiers
- Aliases: ROBO4, ECSM4, MRB, roundabout guidance receptor 4, AOVD3
- External IDs: OMIM: 607528; MGI: 1921394; GeneCards: ROBO4

Gene location (Human)
Chr.	Chromosome 11 (human)
Band	11q24.2	Start	124,883,691 bp
Band	11q24.2	End	124,898,500 bp

Gene location (Mouse)
Chr.	Chromosome 9 (mouse)
Band	9|9 A4	Start	37,313,193 bp
Band	9|9 A4	End	37,326,411 bp
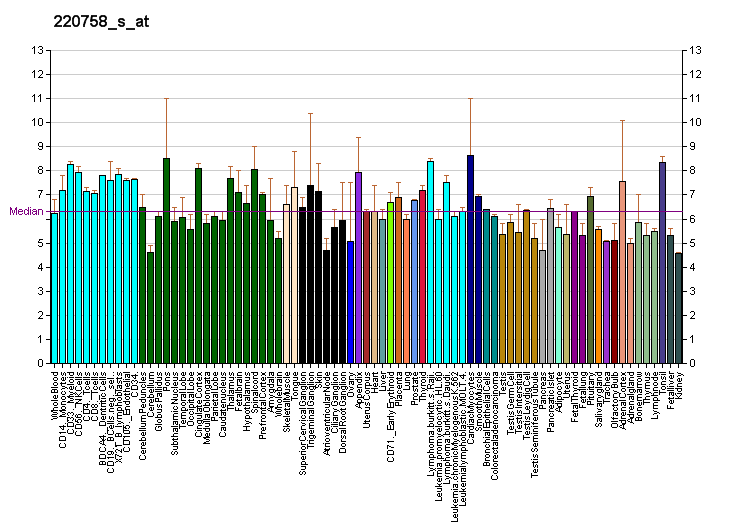
RNA expression pattern
Bgee	Human / Mouse (ortholog); Top expressed in: lower lobe of lung; apex of heart; upper lobe of lung; upper lobe of left lung; spleen; sural nerve; subcutaneous adipose tissue; right lung; visceral pleura; endothelial cell / Top expressed in: interventricular septum; muscle of thigh; left lung; right ventricle; digastric muscle; myocardium of ventricle; urethra; female urethra; left lung lobe; extraocular muscle; More reference expression data
BioGPS	More reference expression data
Gene ontology
Molecular function	signaling receptor activity; cell-cell adhesion mediator activity
Cellular component	integral component of membrane; extracellular exosome; plasma membrane; axon
Biological process	multicellular organism development; cell differentiation; regulation of cell migration; angiogenesis; homophilic cell adhesion via plasma membrane adhesion molecules; axon guidance; dendrite self-avoidance
Sources:Amigo / QuickGO
Orthologs
Databases	NCBI: entry; OMA: entry
Species	Human	Mouse
Entrez	54538	74144
Ensembl	ENSG00000154133	ENSMUSG00000032125
UniProt	Q8WZ75	Q8C310
RefSeq (mRNA)	NM_001301088; NM_019055	NM_028783; NM_001309390
RefSeq (protein)	NP_001288017; NP_061928	NP_001296319; NP_083059
Location (UCSC)	Chr 11: 124.88 – 124.9 Mb	Chr 9: 37.31 – 37.33 Mb
PubMed search
- Wikidata
View/Edit Human	View/Edit Mouse

Roundabout homolog 4 is a protein that in humans is encoded by the ROBO4 gene.
