= SLIT2 =

Protein-coding gene in the species Homo sapiens

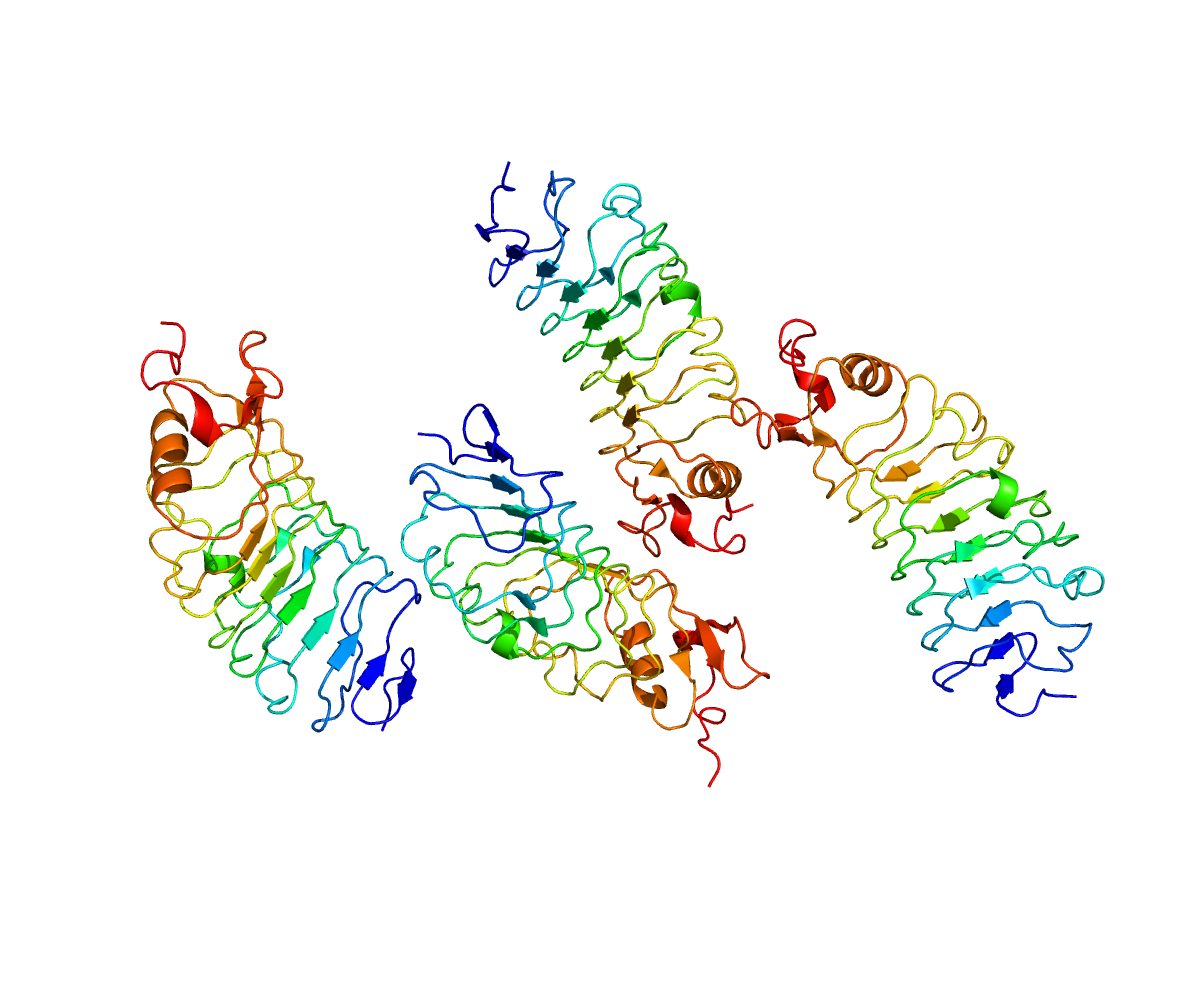
Available structures
PDB	Ortholog search: H0Y9Z6 PDBe H0Y9Z6 RCSB
PDB	List of PDB id codes 2V70, 2V9S, 2V9T, 2WFH

Identifiers
- Aliases: SLIT2, SLIL3, Slit-2, slit guidance ligand 2
- External IDs: OMIM: 603746; MGI: 1315205; HomoloGene: 3516; GeneCards: SLIT2; OMA:SLIT2 - orthologs

Gene location (Human)
Chr.	Chromosome 4 (human)
Band	4p15.31	Start	20,251,905 bp
Band	4p15.31	End	20,620,561 bp

Gene location (Mouse)
Chr.	Chromosome 5 (mouse)
Band	5|5 B3	Start	48,140,480 bp
Band	5|5 B3	End	48,465,075 bp
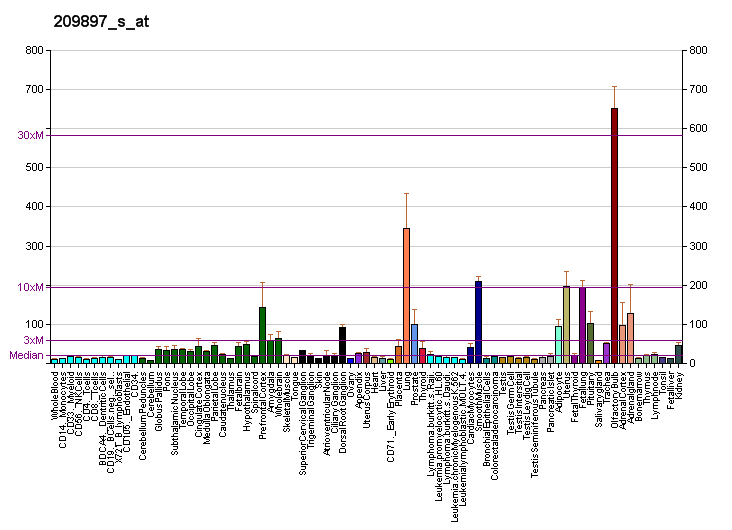
RNA expression pattern
Bgee	Human / Mouse (ortholog); Top expressed in: lower lobe of lung; olfactory bulb; vena cava; trigeminal ganglion; right lung; spinal ganglia; urethra; pericardium; parietal pleura; middle temporal gyrus / Top expressed in: floor plate; ciliary body; sciatic nerve; vas deferens; Epithelium of choroid plexus; body of femur; iris; left lung lobe; medullary collecting duct; mammillary body; More reference expression data
BioGPS	More reference expression data
Gene ontology
Molecular function	calcium ion binding; heparin binding; protein homodimerization activity; GTPase inhibitor activity; laminin-1 binding; protein binding; identical protein binding; Roundabout binding; proteoglycan binding
Cellular component	cytoplasm; membrane; extracellular region; cell surface; extracellular exosome; plasma membrane; extracellular space
Biological process	negative regulation of protein phosphorylation; negative regulation of chemokine-mediated signaling pathway; negative regulation of neutrophil chemotaxis; negative regulation of cellular response to growth factor stimulus; chemorepulsion involved in embryonic olfactory bulb interneuron precursor migration; cell differentiation; ureteric bud development; negative chemotaxis; negative regulation of actin filament polymerization; negative regulation of small GTPase mediated signal transduction; negative regulation of retinal ganglion cell axon guidance; negative regulation of mononuclear cell migration; corticospinal neuron axon guidance through spinal cord; negative regulation of smooth muscle cell migration; Roundabout signaling pathway; positive regulation of axonogenesis; nervous system development; cell migration involved in sprouting angiogenesis; negative regulation of endothelial cell migration; axon guidance; multicellular organism development; chemotaxis; negative regulation of smooth muscle cell chemotaxis; cellular response to hormone stimulus; negative regulation of cell migration; negative regulation of monocyte chemotaxis; negative regulation of cell growth; response to cortisol; apoptotic process involved in luteolysis; positive regulation of apoptotic process; induction of negative chemotaxis; cellular response to heparin; motor neuron axon guidance; branching morphogenesis of an epithelial tube; negative regulation of leukocyte chemotaxis; chemorepulsion involved in postnatal olfactory bulb interneuron migration; axon extension involved in axon guidance; negative regulation of lamellipodium assembly; negative regulation of vascular permeability; retinal ganglion cell axon guidance; negative regulation of GTPase activity; aortic valve morphogenesis; pulmonary valve morphogenesis; ventricular septum morphogenesis
Sources:Amigo / QuickGO
Orthologs
Species	Human	Mouse
Entrez	9353	20563
Ensembl	ENSG00000145147	ENSMUSG00000031558
UniProt	O94813	Q9R1B9
RefSeq (mRNA)	NM_001289135; NM_001289136; NM_004787	NM_001291227; NM_001291228; NM_178804
RefSeq (protein)	NP_001276064; NP_001276065; NP_004778	NP_001278156; NP_001278157; NP_848919
Location (UCSC)	Chr 4: 20.25 – 20.62 Mb	Chr 5: 48.14 – 48.47 Mb
PubMed search
- Wikidata
View/Edit Human	View/Edit Mouse

Slit homolog 2 protein is a protein that in humans is encoded by the SLIT2 gene.

== Interactions ==
SLIT2 has been shown to interact with Glypican 1.
