= ROBO3 =

Protein-coding gene in the species Homo sapiens

Identifiers
- Aliases: ROBO3, HGPPS, HGPS, RBIG1, RIG1, roundabout guidance receptor 3, HGPPS1
- External IDs: OMIM: 608630; MGI: 1343102; GeneCards: ROBO3

Gene location (Human)
Chr.	Chromosome 11 (human)
Band	11q24.2	Start	124,865,432 bp
Band	11q24.2	End	124,881,471 bp

Gene location (Mouse)
Chr.	Chromosome 9 (mouse)
Band	9|9 A4	Start	37,326,965 bp
Band	9|9 A4	End	37,344,542 bp
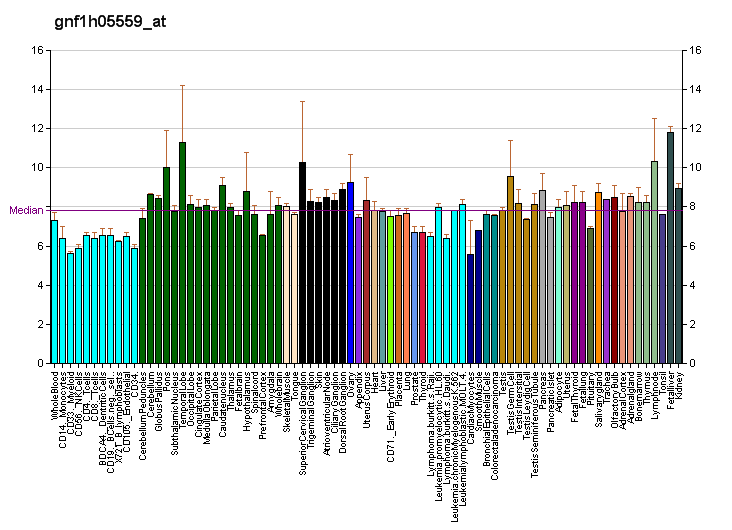
RNA expression pattern
Bgee	Human / Mouse (ortholog); Top expressed in: right uterine tube; left ovary; right ovary; vena cava; sural nerve; left uterine tube; amygdala; right frontal lobe; tendon of biceps brachii; C1 segment / Top expressed in: gray matter layer of cerebellum; superior frontal gyrus; primary visual cortex; nerve fascicle; rhombic lip; habenula; outer nuclear layer; embryo; inner nuclear layer; secondary oocyte; More reference expression data
BioGPS	More reference expression data
Gene ontology
Molecular function	protein binding; cell-cell adhesion mediator activity
Cellular component	integral component of membrane; axon; membrane; plasma membrane
Biological process	multicellular organism development; chemotaxis; cell differentiation; axon midline choice point recognition; Roundabout signaling pathway; nervous system development; axon guidance; homophilic cell adhesion via plasma membrane adhesion molecules; chemoattraction of axon; dendrite self-avoidance; commissural neuron axon guidance
Sources:Amigo / QuickGO
Orthologs
Databases	NCBI: entry; OMA: entry
Species	Human	Mouse
Entrez	64221	19649
Ensembl	ENSG00000154134	ENSMUSG00000032128
UniProt	Q96MS0	Q9Z2I4
RefSeq (mRNA)	NM_022370	NM_001164767; NM_011248
RefSeq (protein)	NP_071765; NP_001357285; NP_001357286; NP_001357287; NP_001357288 NP_001357290; NP_001357293; NP_001357295	n/a
Location (UCSC)	Chr 11: 124.87 – 124.88 Mb	Chr 9: 37.33 – 37.34 Mb
PubMed search
- Wikidata
View/Edit Human	View/Edit Mouse

Roundabout homolog 3 is a protein that in humans is encoded by the ROBO3 gene.
