= Syndromic microphthalmia =

Developmental disorder involving the eye

- Symptoms: Abnormally small eyeball(s)
- Usual onset: Birth
- Duration: Lifelong
- Causes: Genetic or environmental factors
- Frequency: 1 in 10,000 individuals

Syndromic microphthalmia is a class of rare congenital anomalies characterized by microphthalmia along with other non-ocular malformations. Syndromic microphthalmia accounts for 60 to 80% of all cases of microphthalmia. Syndromic microphthalmias are caused by mutations in genes related to embryonic craniofacial development, and they are typically classified based on their genetic cause.

== Classification ==
If microphthalmia is present, genetic testing can be done to inform a specific diagnosis of a named syndrome. Twenty to forty percent of anophthalmia and microphthalmia patients are diagnosed with a recognized syndrome. There are 14 numbered syndromic microphthalmies (MCOPS) primarily defined by their ocular manifestations:

MCOPS classification
Type	Causative gene/locus	Inheritance (Note: AD: autosomal dominant; AR: autosomal recessive; XL: X-linked; XLD: X-linked dominant; XLR: X-linked recessive)	Synonyms
MCOPS1	NAA10	XL	Lenz microphthalmia syndrome
MCOPS2	BCOR	XLR	Lenz microphthalmia syndrome
MCOPS2	BCOR	XLD	oculofaciocardiodental syndrome
MCOPS3	SOX2	AD	SOX2 anophthalmia syndrome, anophthalmia/microphthalmia-esophageal atresia (AEG) syndrome
MCOPS4	Xq27-q28	XLR	microphthalmia-ankyloblepharon-intellectual disability syndrome
MCOPS5	OTX2	AD	OTX2-related eye disorders
MCOPS6	BMP4	AD	Bakrania-Ragge syndrome, microphthalmia with brain and digit anomalies
MCOPS7	HCCS, COX7B, NDUFB11	XLD	MIDAS syndrome, microphthalmia with linear skin defects (MLS) syndrome
MCOPS8	SNX3	AD	microcephaly-microphthalmia ectrodactyly of lower limbs and prognathism (MMEP) syndrome, Viljoen–Smart syndrome
MCOPS9	STRA6	AR	anophthalmia/microphthalmia and pulmonary hypoplasia, Spear syndrome, Matthew–Wood syndrome
MCOPS10	unknown		microphthalmia and brain atrophy (MOBA) syndrome
MCOPS11	VAX1	AR	N/A
MCOPS12	RARB	AD, AR	microphthalmia with or without pulmonary hypoplasia, diaphragmatic hernia, and/or cardiac defects
MCOPS13	HMGB3	XL	colobomatous microphthalmia with microcephaly, short stature, and psychomotor retardation, Maine microphthalmos
MCOPS14	MAB21L2	AD, AR	colobomatous microphthalmia-rhizomelic dysplasia syndrome, microphthalmia-coloboma-rhizomelic skeletal dysplasia

In addition to MCOPS1–14, there are many genetic syndromes of which microphthalmia is a key feature:

Syndromes causing microphthalmia
Causative gene/locus	Inheritance	Name/synonyms
unknown	XLD	Aicardi syndrome (AIC), agenesis of corpus callosum with chorioretinal abnormality
KIAA1109	AR	Alkuraya–Kucinskas syndrome (ALKKCUS)
MAF	AD	Aymé–Gripp syndrome (AYGRP)
ACTB	AD	Fryns–Aftimos syndrome, Baraitser–Winter syndrome 1 (BRWS1)
ACTG1	AD	Baraitser–Winter syndrome 2 (BRWS2)
unknown		Biemond syndrome
FOXL2	AD	Blepharophimosis, ptosis, epicanthus inversus syndrome (BPES)
SMCHD1	AD	Bosma arhinia microphthalmia syndrome (BAMS)
TFAP2A	AD	Branchio-oculo-facial syndrome (BOFS), hemangiomatous branchial clefts-lip pseudocleft syndrome
ERCC6	AR	Cockayne syndrome type B (CSB), cerebro-oculo-facio-skeletal syndrome 1 (COFS1)
CHD7	AD	CHARGE syndrome
HDAC6	XLD	Chondrodysplasia with platyspondyly, distinctive brachydactyly, hydrocephaly, and microphthalmia
unknown		Colobomatous microphthalmia-obesity-hypogenitalism-intellectual disability syndrome
YAP1	AD	Coloboma, ocular, with or without hearing impairment, cleft lip/palate, and/or intellectual disability (COB1)
FAT1	AR	Colobomatous microphthalmia, ptosis, nephropathy, and syndactyly
MITF	AD	Waardenburg syndrome type 2
MITF	AR	COMMAD syndrome
SRD5A3	AR	Congenital disorder of glycosylation type 1q (CDG1q)
SMO	unknown	Curry–Jones syndrome (CJS)
SALL4	AR	Duane-radial ray syndrome, Okihiro syndrome
FANCA, FANCD2, FANCE, FANCI, FANCL	AR	Fanconi anemia complementation groups A, D2, E, I, L
PORCN	XLD	Focal dermal hypoplasia, Goltz-Gorlin syndrome
FRAS1	AR	Fraser syndrome 1
FREM2	AR	Fraser syndrome 2
GRIP1	AR	Fraser syndrome 3
ALX3	AR	Frontonasal dysplasia 1 (FND1)
ALX1	AR	Frontonasal dysplasia 3 (FND3)
unknown	AR	Fryns syndrome
unknown		GOMBO syndrome (growth retardation, ocular abnormalities, microcephaly, brachydactyly, and oligophrenia)
SLC25A24	AD	Gorlin–Chaudhry–Moss syndrome
FAM111A	AD	Gracile bone dysplasia (GCLEB), Kenny–Caffey syndrome
unknown		Hallermann–Streiff syndrome
SMG9	AR	Heart and brain malformation syndrome (HBMS)
14q32	AD	Hemifacial microsomia
SIX3, SHH, PTCH1, GLI2	AD	Holoprosencephaly types 1, 2, 3, 7, 9
IKBKG	XLD	Incontinentia pigmenti
PDE6D	AR	Joubert syndrome 22
unknown	AR	Kapur–Toriello syndrome
KMT2D	AD	Kabuki syndrome
KDM6A	XLD	Kabuki syndrome
GDF6	AD	Klippel–Feil syndrome types 1, 3
GDF3	XLD	Klippel–Feil syndrome types 1, 3
unknown	XLD	Macrosomia with lethal microphthalmia
FREM1	AR	Manitoba oculotrichoanal syndrome (MOTA)
MKS1, TMEM216, TMEM67, CEP290, RPGRIP1L	AR	Meckel–Gruber syndrome types 1-5
unknown	likely AD	MOMO syndrome
ZEB2	AR	Mowat–Wilson syndrome
POMT1	AD	Muscle–eye–brain disease type A 1-11
POMT2, POMGNT1, FKTN, FKRP, CRPPA, POMGNT2, DAG1, RXYLT1, B3GALNT2	AR	Muscle–eye–brain disease type A 1-11
NHS	XLD	Nance–Horan syndrome
RERE	AD	Neurodevelopment disorder with anomalies of the brain, eye, and/or heart (NEDBEH)
NPD	XLR	Norrie disease
HMX1	AR	Oculoauricular syndrome
GJA1	AD, AR	Oculodentodigital dysplasia (ODD)
CPLANE1	AR	Orofaciodigital syndrome type VI
LRP5	AR	Osteoporosis-pseudoglioma syndrome
PAX2	AD	Papillorenal syndrome
ATOH7	AR	Persistent fetal vasculature (PFV)/persistent hyperplastic primary vitreous (PHPV)
RIPK4	AR	Popliteal pterygium syndrome (PPS)
PQBP1	XLR	Renpenning's syndrome
RBP4	AR	Retinal dystrophy, iris coloboma and comedogenic acne syndrome (RDCCAS)
DLX1, DLX2	AD	Split-hand/foot malformation type V
C12orf57	AR	Temtamy syndrome
WNT3	AR	Tetra-amelia syndrome
SALL1	AD	Townes–Brocks syndrome
PUF60	AD	Verheij syndrome
RAB3GAP1, RAB3GAP2, RAB18, TBC1D20	AR	Warburg Micro syndrome 1-4
