= Microphthalmia =

Birth defect of the eye

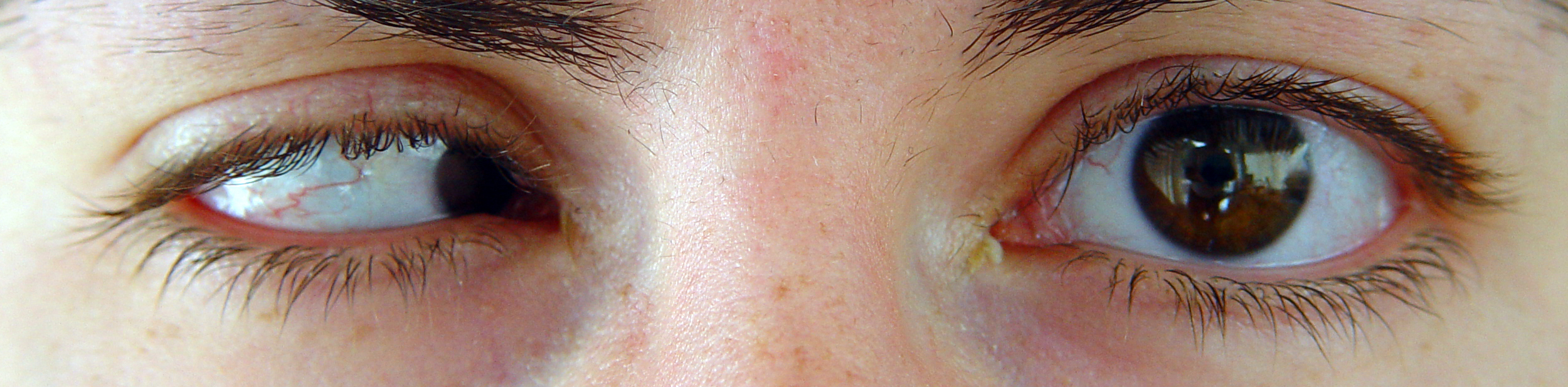
- Right unilateral microphthalmia
- Specialty: Medical genetics
- Symptoms: Abnormally small eyeball(s)
- Usual onset: Birth
- Duration: Lifelong
- Causes: Genetic or environmental factors
- Frequency: 1 in 10,000 individuals

Microphthalmia (Greek: μικρός, mikros, 'small', ὀφθαλμός, ophthalmos, 'eye'), also referred as microphthalmos, is a developmental disorder of the eye in which one (unilateral microphthalmia) or both (bilateral microphthalmia) eyes are abnormally small and have anatomic malformations. Microphthalmia is a distinct condition from anophthalmia and nanophthalmia. Although sometimes referred to as 'simple microphthalmia', nanophthalmia is a condition in which the size of the eye is small but no anatomical alterations are present.

== Presentation ==
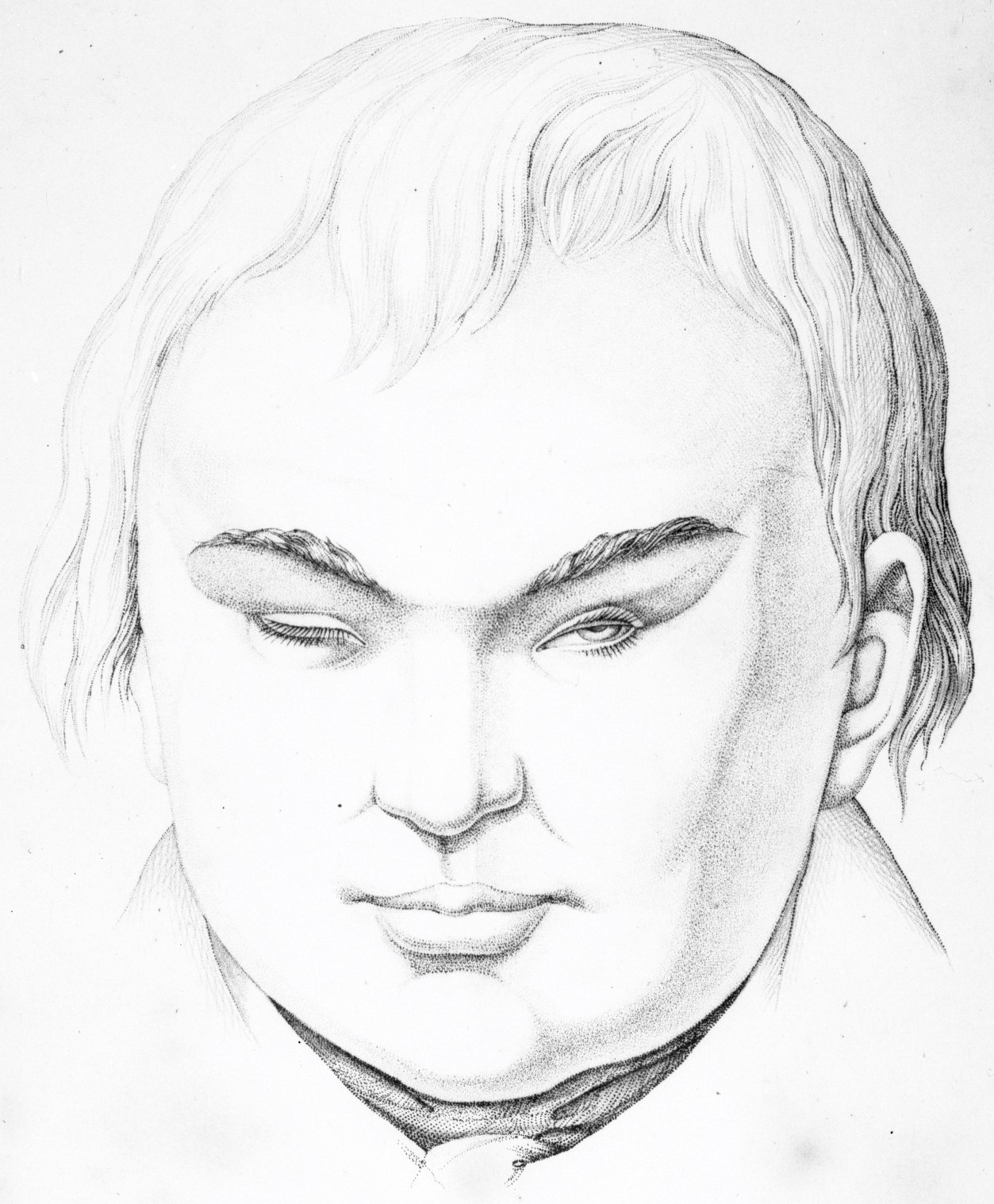
Bilateral microphthalmia

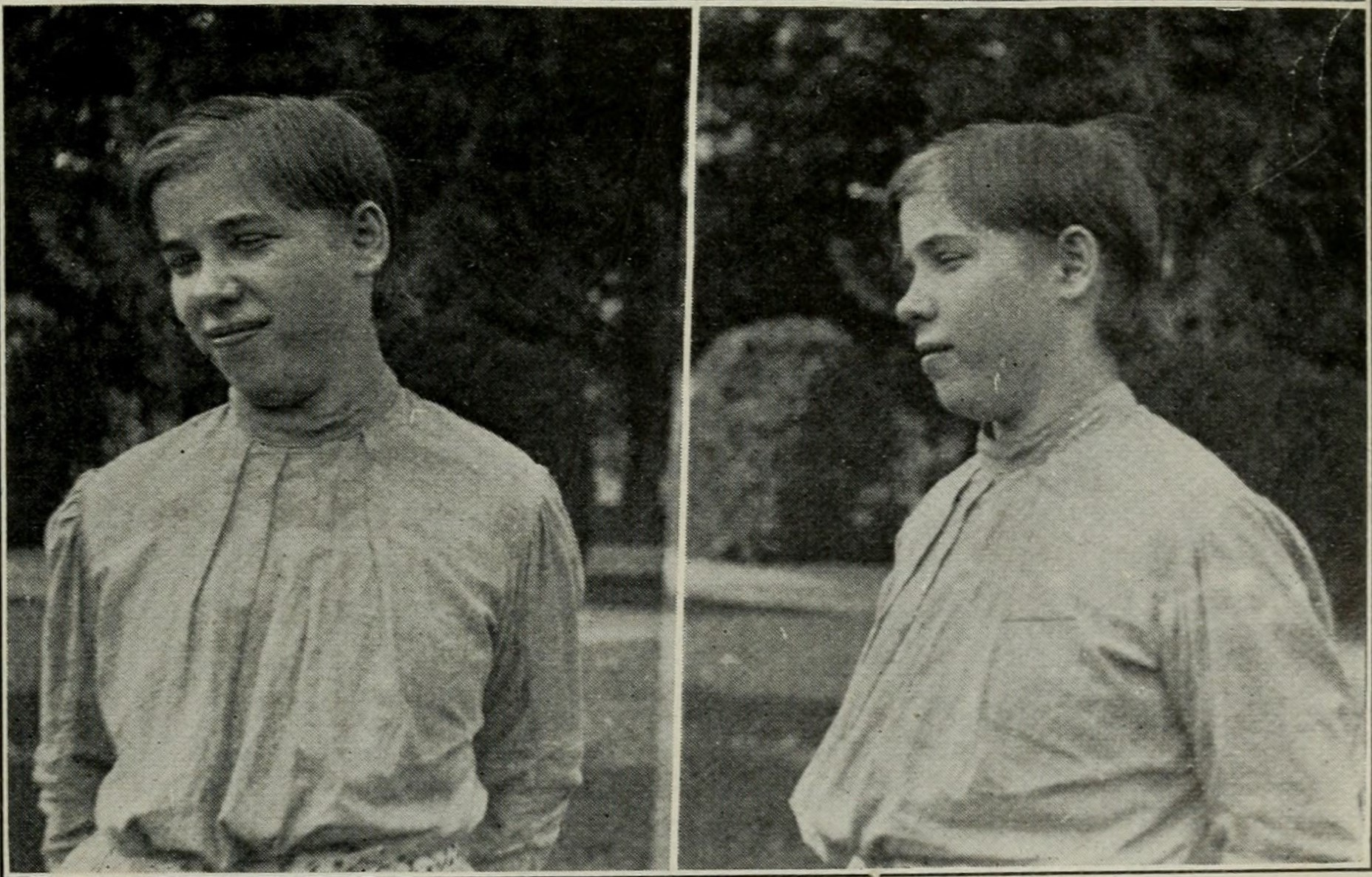
Bilateral microphthalmia in an intellectually disabled 22-year-old

Microphthalmia is a congenital disorder in which the globe of the eye is unusually small and structurally disorganized. While the axis of an adult human eye has an average length of about 23.8 mm (0.94 in), a diagnosis of microphthalmia generally corresponds to an axial length below 21 mm (0.83 in) in adults. Additionally, the diameter of the cornea is about 9–10.5 mm (0.35–0.41 in) in affected newborns and 10.5–12 mm (0.41–0.47 in) in adults with the condition. The presence of a small eye within the orbit can be a normal incidental finding but in many cases it is atypical and results in visual impairment. The prevalence of this condition is around 1 in 10,000 births, and it affects roughly 3–11% of blind children.

== Causes ==
It has been postulated that microphthalmia arises as a result of interference with postnatal eye growth, in contrast to anophthalmia which originates much earlier during fetal development. Genetic causes of microphthalmia include chromosomal abnormalities (e.g. Patau syndrome, mosaic trisomy 9, 13q deletion syndrome, Wolf–Hirschhorn syndrome) or monogenetic Mendelian disorders (e.g. CHARGE syndrome, Fraser syndrome, oculofaciocardiodental syndrome, Lenz microphthalmia syndrome). Microphthalmia in newborns is sometimes associated with fetal alcohol spectrum disorder or infections during pregnancy, particularly herpes simplex virus, rubella and cytomegalovirus (CMV), but the evidence is inconclusive.

The following genes, many of which are transcription and regulatory factors, have been implicated in microphthalmia, anophthalmia, and coloboma:

- ABCB6
- ACTB
- ACTG1
- ALDH1A3
- ATOH7
- BCOR
- BMP4
- BMP7
- C12orf57
- CC2D2A
- CHD7
- CLDN19
- COX7B
- CRIM1
- CRYAA
- CRYBA4
- CRYBB2
- DHX38
- DPYD
- ERCC1
- ERCC5
- FADD
- FAM111A
- FNBP4
- FOXL2
- FRAS1
- FREM1
- FREM2
- FZD5
- GDF3
- GDF6
- GJA1
- GRIP1
- HCCS
- HMGB3
- HMX1
- IGBP1
- KAT6B
- KMT2D
- LRP2
- MAB21L2
- MAF
- MFRP
- NAA10
- NDUFB11
- NHS
- OTX2
- PAX2
- PAX6
- PDE6D
- PIGL
- POLR1C
- POLR1D
- PORCN
- PQBP1
- PRSS56
- PTCH1
- RAB3GAP1
- RAB3GAP2
- RARB
- RAX
- RBP4
- RPGRIP1L
- SALL1
- SALL2
- SALL4
- SCLT1
- SEMA3E
- SHH
- SIX3
- SIX6
- SMOC1
- SNX3
- SOX2
- SRD5A3
- STRA6
- TBC1D20
- TBC1D32
- TBX22
- TCOF1
- TENM3
- TFAP2A
- TMEM98
- TMEM67
- TMX3
- VAX1
- VSX2
- YAP1
- ZEB2
- ZIC2

SOX2 has been implicated in a substantial number (10–15%) of cases and in many other cases failure to develop the ocular lens often results in microphthalmia.

Microphthalmia-associated transcription factor (MITF), located on chromosome 14q32, is associated with one form of isolated microphthalmia (MCOP1). In mammals, the failure of expression of MITF in the retinal pigment epithelium prevents this structure from fully differentiating, causing a malformation of the choroid fissure of the eye and drainage of vitreous body fluid. Without this fluid, the eye fails to enlarge, resulting in microphthalmia. Waardenburg syndrome type 2 in humans may also be caused by mutations in MITF The human MITF gene is homologous to the mouse microphthalmia gene (gene symbol mi); mouse with mutations in this gene are hypopigmented in their fur. The identification of the genetics of WS type 2 owes a lot to observations of phenotypes of MITF-mutant mice.

== Diagnosis ==
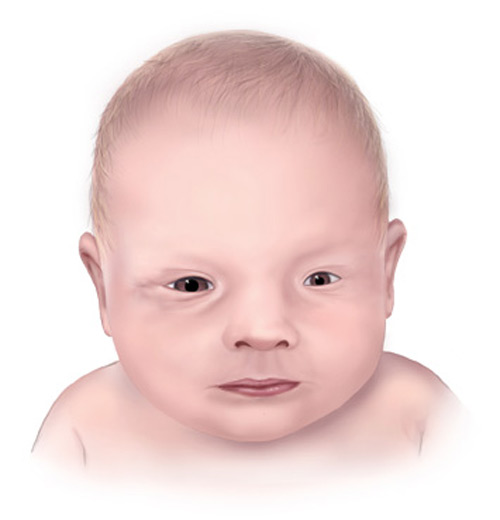
Depiction of Infant with Microphthalmia

Microphthalmia is often diagnosed soon after birth. An initial diagnosis usually occurs after the eyes are inspected through the lids. In addition to visual examinations, measurements of the cornea are used in the diagnosis of this condition. An ultrasound may also be conducted to confirm whether the axial length of the eye is clinically below average (i.e. at least 2 standard deviations below the age-adjusted mean).

When a case of microphthalmia is detected, the patient should visit an eye specialist as soon as possible. It is important for an ophthalmologist to conduct a thorough examination within 2 weeks after birth. The ophthalmologist will confirm the preliminary diagnosis and look for signs of other anomalies in both eyes. These abnormalities may include coloboma, optic nerve hypoplasia, retinal dystrophy, and cataract. Ultrasound may also be used to determine the presence of any internal eye issues, which may not otherwise be visible. It is possible for individuals with microphthalmia to have some vision in the affected eye(s). For this reason, the vision of infants with microphthalmia should be evaluated early on, even in severe cases. Pediatric vision tests along with electrodiagnostics are typically used to assess visual acuity.

If no related symptoms are present, microphthalmia is defined as non-syndromic or isolated microphthalmia (MCOP). When occurring in conjunction with other developmental defects, it may be diagnosed as syndromic microphthalmia (MCOPS). Approximately 60 to 80% of microphthalmia cases are syndromic. Several types of MCOPS have been recognized based on their genetic causes:

MCOPS classification
Type	Causative gene/locus	Inheritance (Note: AD: autosomal dominant; AR: autosomal recessive; XL: X-linked; XLD: X-linked dominant; XLR: X-linked recessive)	Synonyms
MCOPS1	NAA10	XL	Lenz microphthalmia syndrome
MCOPS2	BCOR	XLR	Lenz microphthalmia syndrome
MCOPS2	BCOR	XLD	oculofaciocardiodental syndrome
MCOPS3	SOX2	AD	SOX2 anophthalmia syndrome, anophthalmia/microphthalmia-esophageal atresia (AEG) syndrome
MCOPS4	Xq27-q28	XLR	microphthalmia-ankyloblepharon-intellectual disability syndrome
MCOPS5	OTX2	AD	OTX2-related eye disorders
MCOPS6	BMP4	AD	Bakrania-Ragge syndrome, microphthalmia with brain and digit anomalies
MCOPS7	HCCS, COX7B, NDUFB11	XLD	MIDAS syndrome, microphthalmia with linear skin defects (MLS) syndrome
MCOPS8	SNX3	AD	microcephaly-microphthalmia ectrodactyly of lower limbs and prognathism (MMEP) syndrome, Viljoen–Smart syndrome
MCOPS9	STRA6	AR	anophthalmia/microphthalmia and pulmonary hypoplasia, Spear syndrome, Matthew–Wood syndrome
MCOPS10	unknown		microphthalmia and brain atrophy (MOBA) syndrome
MCOPS11	VAX1	AR	N/A
MCOPS12	RARB	AD, AR	microphthalmia with or without pulmonary hypoplasia, diaphragmatic hernia, and/or cardiac defects
MCOPS13	HMGB3	XL	colobomatous microphthalmia with microcephaly, short stature, and psychomotor retardation, Maine microphthalmos
MCOPS14	MAB21L2	AD, AR	colobomatous microphthalmia-rhizomelic dysplasia syndrome, microphthalmia-coloboma-rhizomelic skeletal dysplasia

== Treatment ==
Microphthalmia cannot be cured. However, there are treatments options to manage the condition and its associated symptoms. When the affected eye(s) display some visual function, a patient's eyesight can be improved (sometimes up to good state) by plus lenses, as a small eye is usually far-sighted. When one of the eyes is unaffected, caution should be taken to guard this 'good' eye and preserve its vision. In these unilateral cases, eye glasses may be worn to offer a measure of physical protection.

A key aspect of managing this condition is accounting for the small volume of the eye. The small orbit size characteristic of microphthalmia can impact the growth and structural development of the face after birth. As a result, microphthalmia can cause hemifacial asymmetry. This possibility is a particular concern for individuals with unilateral cases of microphthalmia. With one eye of average size, the asymmetry often becomes much more severe as the child ages. An axial length of less than 16 mm (0.63 in) indicates that a microphthalmic eye's growth will not be sufficient, and intervention will be necessary to reduce the degree of facial asymmetry.

Minimizing facial asymmetry is important for cosmetic and structural reasons. In order to address the size discrepancy of the affected eye(s), it is important to begin eye socket expansion early in life. The face reaches 70% of its adult size by roughly 2 years of age, and 90% of its adult size by about 5.5 years of age. Additionally, the symmetry fostered by early socket expansion allows for a better prosthetic fit later in life. Typically, an infant begins wearing a conformer, or an unpainted ocular prosthesis, in the first weeks of life. The conformer is repeatedly replaced with a prothesis of a slightly larger size. This process, which takes place during the first 5 years of life, gradually enlarges the eye socket. Socket expansion through the use of implants of increasing size is another effective strategy.

After socket expansion is complete, a painted prosthetic eye can be worn for cosmetic reasons. If the microphthalmic eye has functional vision, an affected individual may opt against wearing a painted prothesis. Lenses are also sometimes used for cosmetic purposes, such as a plus lens to enlarge the microphthalmic eye.

== Epidemiology ==
Microphthalmia and anophthalmia combined are estimated to occur in about 1 in 10,000 births, though estimates have varied from 2 and 23 in 100,000 births. Approximately 3–11% of all blind children born globally have microphthalmia.

Incidence per 10,000 live births of microphthalmia (MO) and anophthalmia (AO)
Study region	Category	Incidence (95% CI)	Time period
Denmark	AO+MO	1.2	1995–2012
UK	AO	0.24 (0.13–0.40)	1999
UK	AO	0.04 (0–0.13)	2011
UK	MO	1.08 (0.82–1.35)	1999
UK	MO	1.00 (0.76–1.24)	2011
US	AO+MO	2.08 (1.90–2.26)	1999–2001
US	AO+MO	1.87 (1.73–2.01)	2004–2006
US	AO+MO	1.91 (1.79–2.03)	2010–2014

== See also ==
- Acorea, microphthalmia and cataract syndrome
- CHARGE syndrome
- Cross syndrome
- Fraser syndrome
- Lenz microphthalmia syndrome
- MCOPS12
- Microphthalmia–dermal aplasia–sclerocornea syndrome
- Nance–Horan syndrome
- Oculofaciocardiodental syndrome
- Patau syndrome
- Walker–Warburg syndrome
- Waardenburg syndrome
