= Oculofaciocardiodental syndrome =

- This condition is inherited in an X-linked dominant manner.
- Specialty: Medical genetics

Oculofaciocardiodental syndrome is a rare X-linked dominant genetic disorder.

== Presentation ==
The incidence of this condition is less than 1 per million. It is primarily only found in females. Its highly rare in males, but some males were born with it. Teeth with large roots (radiculomegaly), heart defects and small eyes (microphthalmia) are the characteristic triad found in this syndrome.

Typical features of the condition include:

- Face
  - Deep set eyes
  - Broad nasal tip divided by a cleft
- Eyes
  - Microphthalmia (small eyes)
  - Early cataracts
  - Glaucoma
- Teeth
  - Radiculomegaly (teeth with very large roots)
  - Delayed loss of primary teeth
  - Missing (oligodontia) or abnormally small teeth
  - Misaligned teeth
  - Defective tooth enamel
- Heart defects
  - Atrial and/or ventricular defects
  - Mitral valve prolapse
- Mild intellectual disability and conductive or sensorineural hearing loss may occur.

== Genetics ==
This condition is caused by lesions in the BCOR gene located on the short arm of the X chromosome (Xp11.4). This protein encodes the BCL6 corepressor, but little is currently known about its function. The inheritance is X-linked dominant.

A genetically related disorder is Lenz microphthalmia syndrome.

== Diagnosis ==
Diagnosis can be confirmed through DNA testing.

== History ==
The first features of this syndrome noted were the abnormal teeth, which were described by Hayward in 1980.
