= PXDN =

Protein-coding gene in the species Homo sapiens

Identifiers
- Aliases: PXDN, COPOA, D2S448, D2S448E, MG50, PRG2, PXN, VPO, peroxidasin, ASGD7
- External IDs: OMIM: 605158; MGI: 1916925; GeneCards: PXDN

Gene location (Human)
| Chr. | Chromosome 2 (human) |
| Band | 2p25.3 | Start | 1,631,887 bp |
| Band | 2p25.3 | End | 1,744,852 bp |

Gene location (Mouse)
| Chr. | Chromosome 12 (mouse) |
| Band | 12|12 A2 | Start | 29,987,607 bp |
| Band | 12|12 A2 | End | 30,067,657 bp |
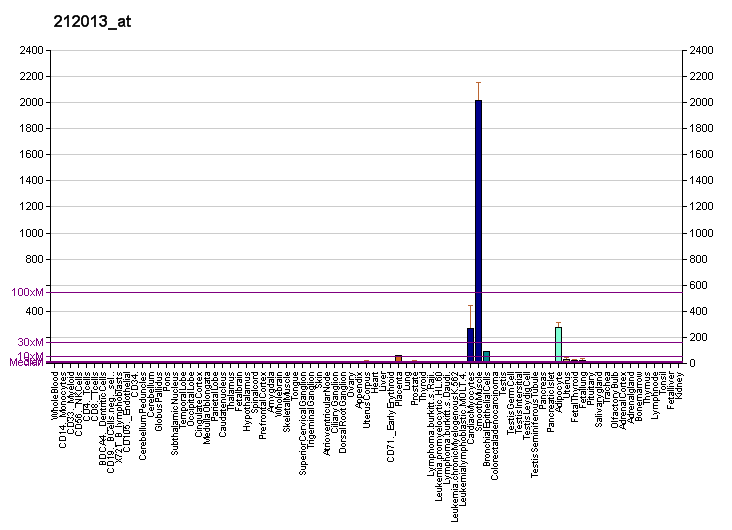

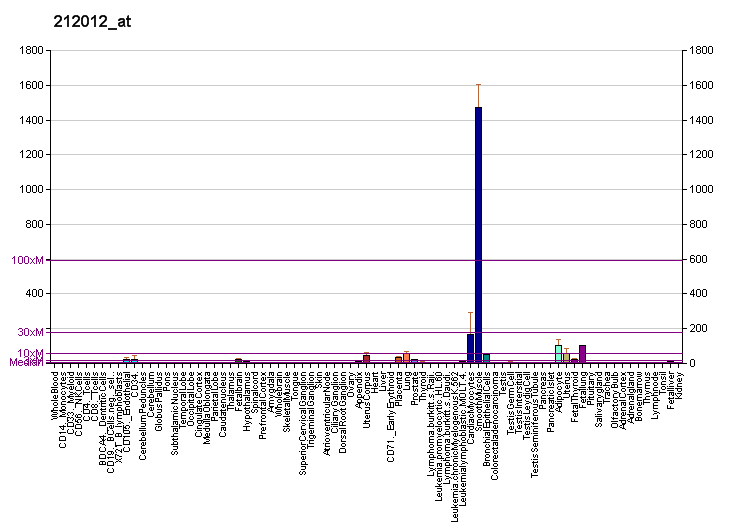
RNA expression pattern
| Bgee | Human / Mouse (ortholog); Top expressed in: stromal cell of endometrium; hair follicle; tendon of biceps brachii; visceral pleura; parietal pleura; saphenous vein; smooth muscle tissue; cartilage tissue; ascending aorta; adipose tissue / Top expressed in: hand; epithelium of lens; renal corpuscle; umbilical cord; epididymis; Gonadal ridge; left lung lobe; medullary collecting duct; otic vesicle; external carotid artery; More reference expression data |
| BioGPS | More reference expression data |
Gene ontology
| Molecular function | oxidoreductase activity; extracellular matrix structural constituent; heme binding; interleukin-1 receptor antagonist activity; metal ion binding; peroxidase activity |
| Cellular component | extracellular matrix; extracellular exosome; endoplasmic reticulum; extracellular space; extracellular region; collagen-containing extracellular matrix |
| Biological process | extracellular matrix organization; response to oxidative stress; immune response; hydrogen peroxide catabolic process; cellular oxidant detoxification; negative regulation of cytokine-mediated signaling pathway |
Sources:Amigo / QuickGO
Orthologs
| Databases | NCBI: entry; OMA: entry |
| Species | Human | Mouse |
| Entrez | 7837 | 69675 |
| Ensembl | ENSG00000130508 | ENSMUSG00000020674 |
| UniProt | Q92626 | Q3UQ28 |
| RefSeq (mRNA) | NM_012293 | NM_181395; NM_177804 |
| RefSeq (protein) | NP_036425 | NP_852060 |
| Location (UCSC) | Chr 2: 1.63 – 1.74 Mb | Chr 12: 29.99 – 30.07 Mb |
| PubMed search |
- Wikidata
| View/Edit Human | View/Edit Mouse |

Peroxidasin homolog is a protein that in humans is encoded by the PXDN gene.

Peroxidasin requires ionic bromine as a co-factor, making bromine an essential element for human life.

== Clinical significance ==
Mutations in PXDN are associated with microphthalmia.
