= N-alpha-acetyltransferase 10 =

Protein-coding gene in the species Homo sapiens

NAA10

Identifiers
- Aliases: NAA10, ARD1, ARD1A, ARD1P, DXS707, MCOPS1, NATD, TE2, OGDNS, N(alpha)-acetyltransferase 10, NatA catalytic subunit, hARD1, N-alpha-acetyltransferase 10, NatA catalytic subunit
- External IDs: OMIM: 300013; MGI: 1915255; GeneCards: NAA10
Enzyme activity
EC #	BRENDA	ExPASy	KEGG	MetaCyc
2.3.1.255	↗	↗	↗	↗

Gene location (Human)
Chr.	X chromosome (human)
Band	Xq28	Start	153,929,225 bp
Band	Xq28	End	153,935,080 bp

Gene location (Mouse)
Chr.	X chromosome (mouse)
Band	X|X A7.3	Start	72,960,479 bp
Band	X|X A7.3	End	72,965,550 bp
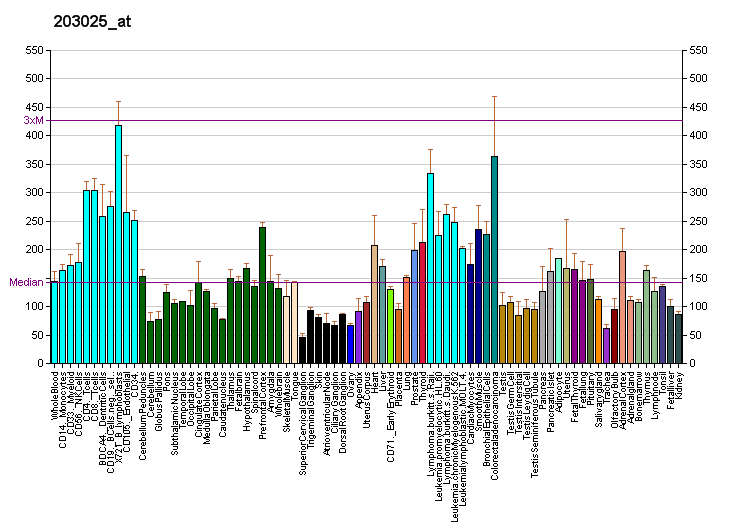
RNA expression pattern
Bgee	Human / Mouse (ortholog); Top expressed in: right hemisphere of cerebellum; apex of heart; gastrocnemius muscle; left coronary artery; muscle of thigh; anterior pituitary; body of uterus; right frontal lobe; muscle layer of sigmoid colon; ascending aorta / Top expressed in: epiblast; embryo; embryo; bone marrow; ventricular zone; lip; neural tube; autopod region; tail of embryo; hand; More reference expression data
BioGPS	More reference expression data
Gene ontology
Molecular function	ribosome binding; transferase activity; N-acetyltransferase activity; acetyltransferase activity; peptide-serine-N-acetyltransferase activity; acyltransferase activity; protein binding; peptide-glutamate-N-acetyltransferase activity; peptide alpha-N-acetyltransferase activity
Cellular component	cytoplasm; NatA complex; cytosolic ribosome; nucleolus; intracellular anatomical structure; membrane; nucleus; cytosol
Biological process	N-terminal peptidyl-glutamic acid acetylation; N-terminal peptidyl-serine acetylation; internal protein amino acid acetylation; N-terminal protein amino acid acetylation; protein acetylation; negative regulation of maintenance of mitotic sister chromatid cohesion, centromeric
Sources:Amigo / QuickGO
Orthologs
Databases	NCBI: entry; OMA: entry
Species	Human	Mouse
Entrez	8260	56292
Ensembl	ENSG00000102030	ENSMUSG00000031388
UniProt	P41227	Q9QY36
RefSeq (mRNA)	NM_003491; NM_001256119; NM_001256120	NM_001177965; NM_019870; NM_001310538
RefSeq (protein)	NP_001243048; NP_001243049; NP_003482	NP_001171436; NP_001297467; NP_063923
Location (UCSC)	Chr X: 153.93 – 153.94 Mb	Chr X: 72.96 – 72.97 Mb
PubMed search
- Wikidata
View/Edit Human	View/Edit Mouse

N-alpha-acetyltransferase 10 (NAA10) also known as NatA catalytic subunit Naa10 and arrest-defective protein 1 homolog A (ARD1A) is an enzyme subunit that in humans is encoded NAA10 gene. Together with its auxiliary subunit Naa15, Naa10 constitutes the NatA (N^{α}-acetyltransferase A) complex that specifically catalyzes the transfer of an acetyl group from acetyl-CoA to the N-terminal primary amino group of certain proteins. In higher eukaryotes, 5 other N-acetyltransferase (NAT) complexes, NatB-NatF, have been described that differ both in substrate specificity and subunit composition.

== Gene and transcripts ==
The human NAA10 is located on chromosome Xq28 and contains 8 exons, 2 encoding three different isoforms derived from alternate splicing. Additionally, a processed NAA10 gene duplication NAA11 (ARD2) has been identified that is expressed in several human cell lines; however, later studies indicate that Naa11 is not expressed in the human cell lines HeLa and HEK293 or in cancerous tissues, and NAA11 transcripts were only detected in testicular and placental tissues. Naa11 has also been found in mouse, where it is mainly expressed in the testis. NAA11 is located on chromosome 4q21.21 in human and 5 E3 in mouse, and only contains two exons. Mice have another Naa10-like paralog, Naa12. Naa12 has NAT activity and genetically compensates for loss of Naa10, while being Naa10/Naa12 null is embryonic lethal in mic.

In mouse, NAA10 is located on chromosome X A7.3 and contains 9 exons. Two alternative splicing products of mouse Naa10, mNaa10_{235} and mNaa10_{225}, were reported in NIH-3T3 and JB6 cells that may have different activities and function in different subcellular compartments.

Homologues for Naa10 have been identified in almost all kingdoms of life analyzed, including plants, fungi, amoebozoa, archaeabacteria and protozoa. In eubacteria, 3 N^{α}-acetyltransferases, RimI, RimJ and RimL, have been identified but according to their low sequence identity with the NATs, it is likely that the RIM proteins do not have a common ancestor and evolved independently.

== Structure ==
Size-exclusion chromatography and circular dichroism indicated that human Naa10 consists of a compact globular region comprising two thirds of the protein and a flexible unstructured C-terminus. X-ray crystal structure of the 100 kD holo-NatA (Naa10/Naa15) complex from S. pombe showed that Naa10 adopts a typical GNAT fold containing a N-terminal α1–loop–α2 segment that features one large hydrophobic interface and exhibits interactions with its auxiliary subunit Naa15, a central acetyl CoA-binding region, and C-terminal segments that are similar to the corresponding regions in Naa50, another N^{α}-acetyltransferase. The X-ray crystal structure of archaeal T. volcanium Naa10 has also been reported, revealing multiple distinct modes of acetyl-Co binding involving the loops between β4 and α3, including the P-loop. Non-complexed (Naa15 unbound) Naa10 adopts a different fold: Leu22 and Tyr26 shift out of the active site of Naa10, and Glu24 (important for substrate binding and catalysis of NatA) is repositioned by ~5 Å, resulting in a conformation that allows for the acetylation of a different subset of substrates. An X-ray crystal structure of human Naa10 in complex with Naa15 and HYPK has been reported.

A functional nuclear localization signal in the C-terminus of hNaa10 between residues 78 and 83 (KRSHRR) has been described.

== Function ==
Naa10, as part of the NatA complex, is bound to the ribosome and co-translationally acetylates proteins starting with small side chains such as Ser, Ala, Thr, Gly, Val and Cys, after the initiator methionine (iMet) has been cleaved by methionine aminopeptidases (MetAP). Furthermore, post-translational acetylation by non-ribosome-associated Naa10 might occur. About 40-50 % of all proteins are potential NatA substrates. Additionally, in a monomeric state, structural rearrangements of the substrate binding pocket Naa10 allow acetylation of N-termini with acidic side chains. Furthermore, N^{ε}-acetyltransferase activity and N-terminal propionyltransferase activity have been reported.

Despite the fact that N^{α}-terminal acetylation of proteins has been known for many years, the functional consequences of this modification are not well understood. However, accumulating evidence have linked Naa10 to various signaling pathways, including Wnt/β-catenin, MAPK, JAK/STAT, and NF-κB, thereby regulating various cellular processes, including cell migration, cell cycle control, DNA damage control, caspase-dependent cell death, p53 dependent apoptosis, cell proliferation and autophagy as well as hypoxia, although there are some major discrepancies regarding hypoxia and even isoform specific effects of Naa10 functions have been reported in mouse.

Naa10 is essential in D. melanogaster, C. elegans and T. brucei. In S. cerevisiae, Naa10 function is not essential but yNAA10Δ cells display severe defects including de-repression of the silent mating type locus (HML), failure to enter G_{o} phase, temperature sensitivity, and impaired growth. Naa10-knockout mice have very recently been reported to be viable, displaying a defect in bone development.

== Disease ==
In 2001 A c.109T>C (p.Ser37Pro) variant in NAA10 was identified in two unrelated families with Ogden Syndrome, a X-linked disorder involving a distinct combination of an aged appearance, craniofacial anomalies, hypotonia, global developmental delays, cryptorchidism, and cardiac arrhythmias. Patient fibroblasts displayed altered morphology, growth and migration characteristics and molecular studies indicate that this S37P mutation disrupts the NatA complex and decreases Naa10 enzymatic activity in vitro and in vivo.

Furthermore, two other mutations in Naa10 (R116W mutation in a boy and a V107F mutation in a girl) have been described in two unrelated families with sporadic cases of non-syndromic intellectual disabilities, postnatal growth failure, and skeletal anomalies. The girl was reported as having delayed closure of the fontanels, delayed bone age, broad great toes, mild pectus carinatum, pulmonary artery stenosis, atrial septal defect, prolonged QT interval. The boy was reported as having small hands/feet, high arched palate, and wide interdental spaces.

Additionally, a splice mutation in the intron 7 splice donor site (c.471+2T→A) of NAA10 was reported in a single family with Lenz microphthalmia syndrome (LMS), a very rare, genetically heterogeneous X-linked recessive disorder characterized by microphthalmia or anophthalmia, developmental delay, intellectual disability, skeletal abnormalities and malformations of teeth, fingers and toes. Patient fibroblasts displayed cell proliferation defects, dysregulation of genes involved in retinoic acid signaling pathway, such as STRA6, and deficiencies in retinol uptake.

Accumulating evidence suggests Naa10 function might regulate co-translational protein folding through the modulation of chaperone function, thereby affecting pathological formation of toxic amyloid aggregates in Alzheimer's disease or prion [PSI+] propagation in yeast.

Further information on NAA10 related syndromes can be found at www.naa10gene.com
