= Retinal homeobox protein Rx =

Protein-coding gene in the species Homo sapiens

RAX

Identifiers
- Aliases: RAX, MCOP3, RX, retina and anterior neural fold homeobox
- External IDs: OMIM: 601881; MGI: 109632; GeneCards: RAX

Gene location (Human)
Chr.	Chromosome 18 (human)
Band	18q21.32	Start	59,267,035 bp
Band	18q21.32	End	59,274,086 bp

Gene location (Mouse)
Chr.	Chromosome 18 (mouse)
Band	18 E1|18 39.03 cM	Start	66,061,348 bp
Band	18 E1|18 39.03 cM	End	66,072,858 bp
RNA expression pattern
Bgee	Human / Mouse (ortholog); Top expressed in: anterior pituitary; retinal pigment epithelium; hippocampal formation; hippocampus proper; ventricular zone; zone of skin; skin of abdomen; skin of leg; renal cortex; nucleus of brain / Top expressed in: optic vesicle; neural layer of retina; lens; iris; outer nuclear layer; ciliary body; embryo; embryo; retinal pigment epithelium; pharynx; More reference expression data
BioGPS	n/a
Gene ontology
Molecular function	RNA polymerase II cis-regulatory region sequence-specific DNA binding; DNA binding; sequence-specific DNA binding; DNA-binding transcription activator activity, RNA polymerase II-specific; DNA-binding transcription factor activity, RNA polymerase II-specific
Cellular component	nucleus
Biological process	pattern specification process; multicellular organism development; camera-type eye development; brain development; regulation of transcription, DNA-templated; transcription by RNA polymerase II; transcription, DNA-templated; positive regulation of transcription by RNA polymerase II; hypothalamus development; limb development; visual perception
Sources:Amigo / QuickGO
Orthologs
Databases	NCBI: entry; OMA: entry
Species	Human	Mouse
Entrez	30062	19434
Ensembl	ENSG00000134438	ENSMUSG00000024518
UniProt	Q9Y2V3	O35602
RefSeq (mRNA)	NM_013435	NM_013833
RefSeq (protein)	NP_038463	NP_038861
Location (UCSC)	Chr 18: 59.27 – 59.27 Mb	Chr 18: 66.06 – 66.07 Mb
PubMed search
- Wikidata
View/Edit Human	View/Edit Mouse

Retinal homeobox protein Rx also known as retina and anterior neural fold homeobox is a protein that in humans is encoded by the RAX gene. The RAX gene is located on chromosome 18 in humans, mice, and rats.

== Function ==
This gene encodes a homeobox-containing transcription factor that functions in eye development. The gene is expressed early in the eye primordia, and is required for retinal cell fate determination and also regulates stem cell proliferation.

Towards the end of late gastrulation a single eye field has formed and splits into bilateral fields via action by the signaling molecule, sonic hedgehog (Shh) secreted from the forebrain. Rax and Six-3 (also a transcription factor) maintain the forebrain's ability to secrete Shh by inhibiting activity of the signaling molecule Wnt.

Rax (Retina and Anterior Neural Fold Homeobox) is a gene in the OAR (Otx, Arx,& Rax) subgroup of the paired-like homeodomain family of transcription factors. Discovered in 1997, the Rax gene is known to contribute to the development of the retina, hypothalamus, pineal gland and pituitary gland.

== Clinical significance ==
Mutations in this gene have been reported in patients with defects in ocular development, including microphthalmia, anophthalmia, and coloboma.

Mutations to the Rax gene cause malformation of the retinal field, including anophthalmia and microphthalmia.

Individuals who have a mutation in the RAX gene fail to develop ocular structures, referred to as anophthalmia. RAX mutant individuals can also have microphthalmia, where one or both of the eyes is smaller than normal.

== Animal studies ==
Rax genes are conserved among vertebrates. RAX knockout mice have no eyes and abnormal forebrain formation. In the frog Xenopus tropicalis, Rax mutants are eyeless; the future retinal tissue instead has diencephalon and telencephalon features. Due to a genome duplication at the basis of the teleost fish lineage, fishes contain three Rax genes: Rx1, Rx2, and Rx3. Zebrafish and medaka mutants in Rx3 are eyeless.
