= COX7B =

Protein-coding gene in humans

Identifiers
- Aliases: COX7B, APLCC, LSDMCA2, cytochrome c oxidase subunit 7B
- External IDs: OMIM: 300885; MGI: 1913392; GeneCards: COX7B

Gene location (Human)
Chr.	X chromosome (human)
Band	Xq21.1	Start	77,899,440 bp
Band	Xq21.1	End	77,907,376 bp

Gene location (Mouse)
Chr.	X chromosome (mouse)
Band	X|X D	Start	105,059,306 bp
Band	X|X D	End	105,066,056 bp
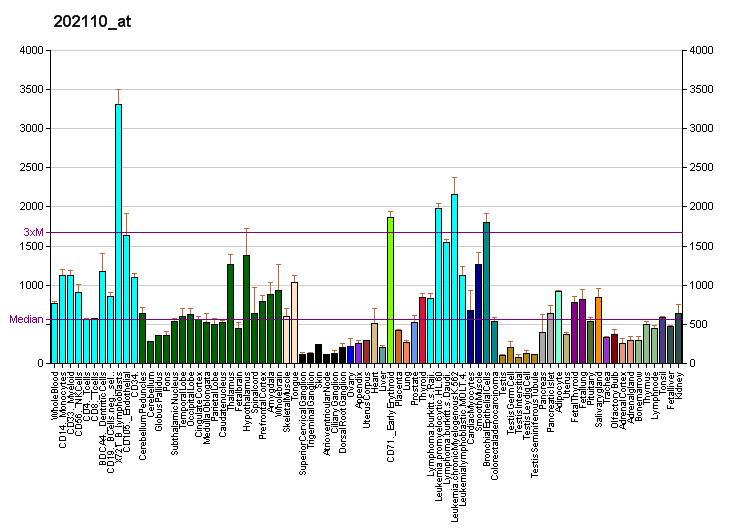
RNA expression pattern
Bgee	Human / Mouse (ortholog); Top expressed in: right ventricle; apex of heart; body of tongue; biceps brachii; muscle of thigh; Skeletal muscle tissue of biceps brachii; thoracic diaphragm; mucosa of sigmoid colon; right auricle of heart; renal medulla / Top expressed in: interventricular septum; left ventricle; myocardium of ventricle; cardiac muscles; cardiac muscle tissue of left ventricle; yolk sac; thoracic diaphragm; quadriceps femoris muscle; skeletal muscle tissue; right kidney; More reference expression data
BioGPS	More reference expression data
Gene ontology
Molecular function	cytochrome-c oxidase activity
Cellular component	integral component of membrane; mitochondrial inner membrane; respiratory chain complex IV; membrane; mitochondrion; mitochondrial respirasome
Biological process	central nervous system development; proton transmembrane transport; electron transport chain; mitochondrial electron transport, cytochrome c to oxygen
Sources:Amigo / QuickGO
Orthologs
Databases	NCBI: entry; OMA: entry
Species	Human	Mouse
Entrez	1349	66142
Ensembl	ENSG00000131174	ENSMUSG00000031231
UniProt	P24311	P56393
RefSeq (mRNA)	NM_001866	NM_025379
RefSeq (protein)	NP_001857	NP_079655
Location (UCSC)	Chr X: 77.9 – 77.91 Mb	Chr X: 105.06 – 105.07 Mb
PubMed search
- Wikidata
View/Edit Human	View/Edit Mouse

Cytochrome c oxidase subunit 7B, mitochondrial (COX7B) is an enzyme that in humans is encoded by the COX7B gene. COX7B is a nuclear-encoded subunit of cytochrome c oxidase (COX). Cytochrome c oxidase (complex IV) is a multi-subunit enzyme complex that couples the transfer of electrons from cytochrome c to molecular oxygen and contributes to a proton electrochemical gradient across the inner mitochondrial membrane, acting as the terminal enzyme of the mitochondrial respiratory chain. Work with Oryzias latices has linked disruptions in COX7B with microphthalmia with linear skin lesions (MLS), microcephaly, and mitochondrial disease. Clinically, mutations in COX7B have been associated with linear skin defects with multiple congenital anomalies.

== Structure ==
COX7B is located on the q arm of the X chromosome in position 21.1 and has 3 exons. The COX7B gene produces a 9.2 kDa protein composed of 80 amino acids. COX7B is one of the nuclear-encoded polypeptide chains of cytochrome c oxidase (COX), a heteromeric complex consisting of 3 catalytic subunits encoded by mitochondrial genes and multiple structural subunits encoded by nuclear genes. The protein encoded by COX7B belongs to the cytochrome c oxidase VIIb family. COX7B has a 24 amino acid transit peptide domain from positions 1-24, an 8 amino acid topological mitochondrial matrix domain from positions 25–32, a helical, 27 amino acid transmembrane domain from positions 33–59, and a 21 amino acid topological intermembrane domain from positions 60–80. COX7B may also have several pseudogenes on chromosomes 1, 2, 20 and 22.

== Function ==
Cytochrome c oxidase (COX), the terminal enzyme of the mitochondrial respiratory chain, catalyzes the electron transfer from reduced cytochrome c to oxygen. The mitochondrially-encoded subunits of COX function in electron transfer, while the nuclear-encoded subunits may be involved in the regulation and assembly of the complex. The COX7B nuclear gene encodes subunit 7B, which is located on the inner mitochondrial membrane in association with several other proteins encompassing the COX complex. It is found in all tissues and has been shown to be highly similar to bovine COX VIIb protein. COX7B is believed to be important for COX assembly and activity, the function of mitochondrial respiratory chain, and the proper development of the central nervous system in vertebrates.

== Model organisms ==
Oryzias latices (also known as medaka) is a Japanese rice fish that has been used as a model organism in COX7B studies. By using a morpholino knockdown technique, COX7B has been shown to be indispensable for COX assembly, COX activity, and mitochondrial respiration. Additionally, the down-regulation of an ortholog of COX7B has suggested that there may be an association between COX7B dysfunction and microphthalmia with linear skin lesions (MLS), microcephaly, and mitochondrial disease. Work with Oryzias latices could also indicate an evolutionary conserved role for the mitochondrial respiratory chain complexes in central nervous system development.

== Clinical significance ==
Mutations in COX7B have been associated with linear skin defects with multiple congenital anomalies. This disorder is a distinct form of aplasia cutis congenita presenting as multiple linear skin defects on the face and neck associated with poor growth and short stature, microcephaly, and facial dysmorphism. Additional clinical features include intellectual disability, nail dystrophy, cardiac abnormalities, diaphragmatic hernia, genitourinary abnormalities, pale optic discs and altered visual-evoked potentials, agenesis of the corpus callosum, and other central nervous system abnormalities. The COX7B mutations associated with disease include c.196delC, a heterozygous mutation leading to a frameshift in exon 3, c.41-2A>G, a heterozygous splice mutation in a novel acceptor site in intron 1, and c.55C>T, a heterozygous nonsense mutation in exon 2. Additionally, experiments with Oryzias latices suggest COX7B may be associated with microphthalmia with linear skin lesions (MLS), an X-linked, dominant, male-lethal mitochondrial disorder.

== Interactions ==
COX7B has been shown to have 6 binary protein-protein interactions including 3 co-complex interactions. GNMT, MYB, MT-CO1, HSCB, and SLC25A13 have all been found to interact with COX7B.
