= Acorea, microphthalmia and cataract syndrome =

- Specialty: Ophthalmology
- Symptoms: Acorea (absence of pupillary aperture) Fibrous occlusion of pupil Microphthalmia Cataracts

Acorea, microphthalmia and cataract syndrome is a rare genetically inherited condition.

== Presentation ==
Acorea or fibrous occlusion of the pupil, microphthalmia and cataracts are present in both eyes. Microcornea and iridocorneal dysgenesis also occur. The retina and optic disc are normal.

== Genetics ==
The cause of this condition is not presently known. It appears to be inherited in an autosomal dominant fashion.
