= Microphthalmia–dermal aplasia–sclerocornea syndrome =

- Other names: MIDAS syndrome
- This condition is inherited in an X-linked dominant manner.
- Specialty: Medical genetics

Microphthalmia–dermal aplasia–sclerocornea syndrome is a condition characterized by linear skin lesions. MLS is a rare X-linked dominant male-lethal disease characterized by unilateral or bilateral microphthalmia and linear skin defects in affected females, and in utero lethality for affected males. It can be associated with HCCS, mutations in it cause microphthalmia with Linear Skin Defects Syndrome.

== See also ==
- List of cutaneous conditions
