= Kapur–Toriello syndrome =

- Other names: Cleft lip/palate-facial, eye, heart and intestinal anomalies syndrome
- Keutel syndrome has an autosomal recessive pattern of inheritance.

Kapur–Toriello syndrome is a rare autosomal recessive genetic disorder. The defining feature of Kapur–Toriello syndrome is abnormal morphology of the columella, the end of the nasal septum, which in the syndrome extends below the margin of the nostrils.

== Presentation ==
Clinical manifestations similar to all five described cases of Kapur–Toriello syndrome severe neurodevelopment delay, microphthalmia and/or coloboma, low set and malformed ears, bilateral cleft lip and palate, and constipation. Out of the five cases, two cases presented with imperforated anus/rectal stenosis. Both cases were described in females and, although not definitive, may describe clinical manifestations that differ between sexes.

== Causes ==
There are currently no known genes linked to Kapur–Toriello syndrome.

== History ==
Kapur–Toriello syndrome was first described in Kapur and Toriello in 1991 who described a sibling pair (brother and sister) with a previously undescribed autosomal recessive disorder. These siblings both had severe mental retardation, cleft lip and palate, heart and intestinal anomalies, and an abnormal nose and long columella. Since their initial description of Kapur–Toriello, only three additional cases have been described.
