= Kenny–Caffey syndrome =

Kenny-Caffey Syndrome Type 2 (KCS2)
- Symptoms: Dwarfism, cortical thickening of tubular bones, transient hypocalcemia
- Usual onset: Inherited and phenotypically present at birth
- Causes: Heterozygous mutation in the FAM111A gene (615292) on chromosome 11q12
- Treatment: Vitamin D, calcium, and iron supplements
- Frequency: Extremely rare: Fewer than 60 cases reported in medical literature

Kenny–Caffey syndrome type 2 (KCS2) is an extremely rare autosomal dominant genetic condition characterized by dwarfism, farsightedness, microphthalmia, and skeletal abnormalities. This subtype of Kenny–Caffey syndrome is caused by a heterozygous mutation in the FAM111A gene (615292) on chromosome 11q12.

This condition is extremely rare, as fewer than 60 confirmed cases have been reported in medical literature. KCS2 affects males and females in equal proportions, and is most often sporadic. However it can be transmitted by an affected mother to their offspring, like in the original family described by Kenny and Caffey. Other genetic variants in the same gene FAM111A may produce the related, but more severe disorder, osteocraniostenosis.

The condition was originally described by Frederic Kenny and Louis Linarelli in 1966 in a mother and her son. In 1967, John Caffey, a pediatric radiologist, described the radiographic aspects of the same family. The condition has since been called Kenny–Caffey syndrome. A somewhat similar, but recessively inherited condition known as Kenny–Caffey syndrome type 1 (KCS1) also exists. This recessive condition includes intellectual disability as a common symptom (unlike KCS2), and is also known as Sanjad–Sakati syndrome or hypoparathyroidism–retardation–dysmorphism syndrome.

== Signs and symptoms ==
Kenny-Caffey syndrome type 2 is often congenital (present at birth), as low birth weight is one of the first symptoms. Individuals with the condition have various bone abnormalities that affect the skeleton, head, and eyes. Most affected individuals also exhibit dwarfism, as the adult height often ranges from 48 to 59 inches. However, contrary to KCS1, individuals with KCS2 have normal intelligence levels.

Various bones are affected by KCS2, as affected individuals often have thickened outer layers of long bones, and abnormally thin marrow cavities (medullary stenosis). Some individuals also exhibit the hardening of some bones (osteosclerosis). Additionally, individuals also have an abnormally large head circumference (macrocephaly) with a prominent forehead due to an abnormally large anterior fontanelle that closes late. Affected individuals may have unusually small eyes (microphthalmia), swelling of the optic disk due to leakage of cerebrospinal fluid (papilledema), and farsightedness.

Hypocalcemia (low levels of calcium in the blood) is also common, usually occurring within two to three months after birth. This is due to the improper regulation of the parathyroid hormone (PTH) along with vitamin D and the hormone calcitonin, which regulates the calcium levels in the blood. The lack of PTH may be due to the improper function or absence of the parathyroid glands in individuals with KCS2. Symptoms often include weakness, muscle cramps, excessive nervousness, loss of memory, headaches, and abnormal sensations such as tingling and numbness of the hands.

People affected by KCS1 have most of the above-mentioned abnormalities and symptoms. They may also exhibit liver disease during the first month of life, abnormally low levels of white blood cells, improper function of T-cells, intellectual disabilities, and/or underdeveloped, malformed nails.

== Diagnosis ==
Due to the rarity of the disease, there is no definitive method of testing for KCS2. Diagnosis of KCS2 usually involves using X-ray studies of the skeleton to reveal distinctive thickening of the outer layers (cortexes) of long bones along with unusually thin marrow cavities. Blood tests can detect episodes of low levels of calcium in the blood (hypocalcemia).

== Management or treatment ==
Treatment may be required to control hypocalcemia and to correct the ocular refraction anomalies. Common methods of controlling hypocalcemia include the taking of oral calcium and vitamin D supplements. Other than this there is a lack of well-established methods for treatment and the symptoms can only be managed by the aforementioned methods.

== Genetics ==
Kenny–Caffey syndrome type 2 has an autosomal dominant inheritance pattern, not to be confused with the autosomal recessive Kenny–Caffey syndrome type 1. The mutations responsible for KCS2 are thought to be a result of heterozygous mutations, or compound heterozygosity; specifically, it is thought to be caused by the substitution or deletion of single amino acids that are phylogenetically conserved in the FAM111A gene. The FAM111A gene is located at 11q12.1 and mutations of the gene are not only responsible for KCS2, but also gracile bone dysplasia (osteocraniostenosis).

The gene FAM111A codes for a 611 amino acid protein that resembles a trypsin-like-peptidase, but the protein's native function is unknown. What is apparent, however, is that FAM111A codes for a protein that is crucial to pathways that govern parathyroid hormone production, calcium homeostasis, and skeletal development and growth. Very little is known about differing severities of Kenny–Caffey syndromes because of the very limited number of affected individuals, but it is known that OCS and KCS2 have different severities and they result from mutations at the same locus.

== Epidemiology ==
Because there have only been 60 reported cases of Kenny–Caffey syndrome in medical literature, there are not enough cases to make the generalizations required to develop an epidemiological understanding of this disease.
