= Oculoauricular syndrome =

- Oculoauricular syndrome is inherited in an autosomal recessive manner.
- Specialty: Medical genetics

Oculoauricular syndrome is a rare genetic condition affecting the eyes and ears. It is due to mutations in the H6 family homeobox 1 (HMX1) gene. It is also known as the Schorderet-Munier-Franceschetti syndrome.

== Signs and symptoms ==
The clinical features of this condition are as follows:

=== Eyes ===
- microphthalmia
- coloboma
- nystagmus
- corneal sclerosis
- cataract
- glaucoma
- anterior synechiae
- posterior synechiae
- macular hypoplasia
- rod-cone dystrophy
- divergent strabismus
- posterior embryotoxon

=== Ears ===
- malformed pinnae
- low-set pinnae
- crumpled helix
- narrow external acoustic meatus
- coloboma of the lobules

Hearing is normal

== Genetics ==
This condition is inherited in an autosomal recessive manner. The gene responsible is located on the short arm of chromosome 4 (4p16.1)

== Pathogensis ==
This is not presently understood.

== Diagnosis ==
=== Differential diagnosis ===
This includes

- Morning glory syndrome

== Epidemiology ==
This condition has only been described in three families to date (2017).

== History ==
This condition was first described in 1945. The gene responsible was identified in 2008.
