= FNBP4 =

Protein-coding gene in the species Homo sapiens

Identifiers
- Aliases: FNBP4, FBP30, formin binding protein 4
- External IDs: OMIM: 615265; MGI: 1860513; HomoloGene: 9087; GeneCards: FNBP4; OMA:FNBP4 - orthologs

Gene location (Human)
Chr.	Chromosome 11 (human)
Band	11p11.2	Start	47,716,494 bp
Band	11p11.2	End	47,767,443 bp

Gene location (Mouse)
Chr.	Chromosome 2 (mouse)
Band	2|2 E1	Start	90,745,370 bp
Band	2|2 E1	End	90,781,021 bp
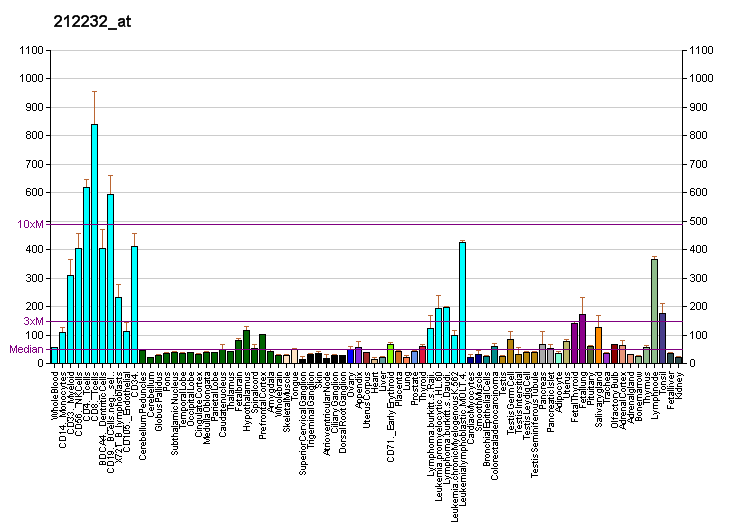
RNA expression pattern
Bgee	Human / Mouse (ortholog); Top expressed in: sural nerve; gastric mucosa; Achilles tendon; left ovary; body of uterus; right ovary; canal of the cervix; body of pancreas; right uterine tube; left lobe of thyroid gland / Top expressed in: tail of embryo; neural layer of retina; genital tubercle; spermatocyte; ventricular zone; zygote; granulocyte; cerebellar cortex; thymus; neural tube; More reference expression data
BioGPS	More reference expression data
Orthologs
Species	Human	Mouse
Entrez	23360	55935
Ensembl	ENSG00000109920; ENSG00000285182	ENSMUSG00000008200
UniProt	Q8N3X1	Q6ZQ03
RefSeq (mRNA)	NM_015308; NM_001318339	NM_018828
RefSeq (protein)	NP_001305268; NP_056123	NP_061298
Location (UCSC)	Chr 11: 47.72 – 47.77 Mb	Chr 2: 90.75 – 90.78 Mb
PubMed search
- Wikidata
View/Edit Human	View/Edit Mouse

Formin-binding protein 4 is a protein that in humans is encoded by the FNBP4 gene.

Mutations in this gene have been found associated to cases similar to microphthalmia with limb anomalies (doi: 10.1002/ajmg.a.35983).
