= Nance–Horan syndrome =

Rare X-linked dominant condition

- Other names: X-linked congenital cataracts and microcornea, X-linked cataract–dental syndrome, cataracts-oto-dental syndrome, cataract–dental syndrome, and mesiodens–cataract syndrome.
- This condition is inherited in an X-linked dominant manner.
- Specialty: Ophthalmology

Nance–Horan syndrome, also known as X-linked congenital cataracts and microcornea, X-linked cataract–dental syndrome, cataracts-oto-dental syndrome, cataract–dental syndrome, and mesiodens–cataract syndrome, is a rare X-linked syndrome characterized by eye and teeth abnormalities, intellectual disability, and facial deformities.

== Signs and symptoms ==
The main ocular sign of Nance–Horan syndrome is a congenital nuclear cataract which results in reduced visual acuity. Other ocular features include microphthalmia, microcornea, strabismus, and nystagmus. Dental features include tapered premolar/molar cusps, supernumerary teeth, screwdriver-shaped incisors, and diastema. Abnormal facial features include anteverted pinnae, prominent and bulbous nose, and long narrow face. 30% of males with Nance–Horan syndrome have intellectual disabilities. Carrier females exhibit less severe clinical symptoms, including lens opacities at the posterior Y-sutures with minimal or no loss of vision, modest face dysmorphism, and dental abnormalities.

== Genetics ==
This syndrome is caused by mutations in the Nance Horan gene (NHS) which is located on the short arm of the X chromosome (Xp22.13).

== Management ==
There is no known cure for this syndrome. Patients usually need ophthalmic surgery and may also need dental surgery. Genetic counseling and screening of the mother's relatives is recommended.

== History ==
This syndrome was first described by Margaret B. Horan and Walter Elmore Nance in 1974.
