= NDUFB11 =

Protein-coding gene in the species Homo sapiens

Identifiers
- Aliases: NDUFB11, CI-ESSS, ESSS, NP17.3, Np15, P17.3, LSDMCA3, NADH:ubiquinone oxidoreductase subunit B11, MC1DN30
- External IDs: OMIM: 300403; MGI: 1349919; GeneCards: NDUFB11

Gene location (Human)
| Chr. | X chromosome (human) |
| Band | Xp11.3 | Start | 47,142,071 bp |
| Band | Xp11.3 | End | 47,145,466 bp |

Gene location (Mouse)
| Chr. | X chromosome (mouse) |
| Band | X|X A1.3 | Start | 20,481,565 bp |
| Band | X|X A1.3 | End | 20,483,858 bp |
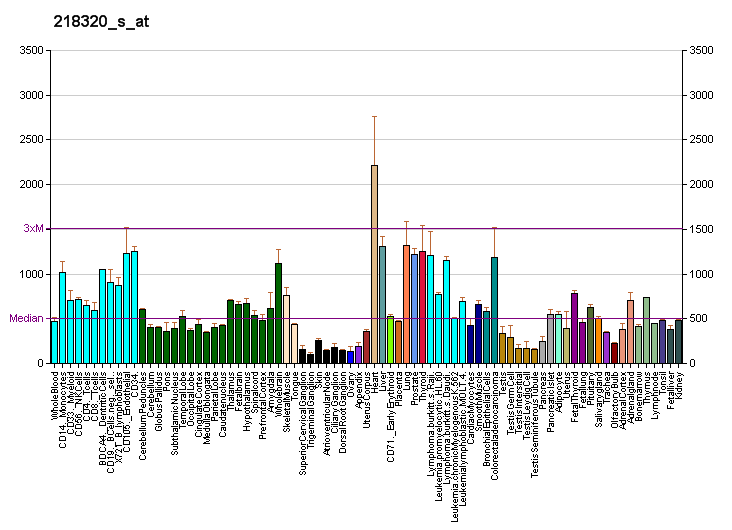
RNA expression pattern
| Bgee | Human / Mouse (ortholog); Top expressed in: apex of heart; muscle of thigh; gastrocnemius muscle; mucosa of transverse colon; left ventricle; right adrenal gland; right auricle of heart; right adrenal cortex; ganglionic eminence; left adrenal gland / Top expressed in: temporal muscle; digastric muscle; sternocleidomastoid muscle; interventricular septum; triceps brachii muscle; right ventricle; plantaris muscle; extensor digitorum longus muscle; extraocular muscle; cardiac muscle tissue of left ventricle; More reference expression data |
| BioGPS | More reference expression data |
Gene ontology
| Molecular function | protein binding |
| Cellular component | membrane; respirasome; mitochondrial respiratory chain complex I; integral component of membrane; mitochondrial inner membrane; mitochondrion |
| Biological process | mitochondrial respiratory chain complex I assembly; mitochondrial electron transport, NADH to ubiquinone |
Sources:Amigo / QuickGO
Orthologs
| Databases | NCBI: entry; OMA: entry |
| Species | Human | Mouse |
| Entrez | 54539 | 104130 |
| Ensembl | ENSG00000147123 | ENSMUSG00000031059 |
| UniProt | Q9NX14 | O09111 |
| RefSeq (mRNA) | NM_019056; NM_001135998 | NM_019435; NM_001358624 |
| RefSeq (protein) | NP_001129470; NP_061929 | NP_062308; NP_001345553 |
| Location (UCSC) | Chr X: 47.14 – 47.15 Mb | Chr X: 20.48 – 20.48 Mb |
| PubMed search |
- Wikidata
| View/Edit Human | View/Edit Mouse |

ESSS subunit of NADH:ubiquinone oxidoreductase (complex I)

Identifiers
- Symbol: ESSS
- Pfam: PF10183
- InterPro: IPR019329
Available protein structures:
- PDB: IPR019329 PF10183 (ECOD; PDBsum)
- AlphaFold: IPR019329; PF10183

NADH dehydrogenase [ubiquinone] 1 beta subcomplex subunit 11, mitochondrial (NADH-ubiquinone oxidoreductase ESSS subunit) is an enzyme that in humans is encoded by the NDUFB11 gene. NADH dehydrogenase (ubiquinone) 1 beta subcomplex subunit 11 is an accessory subunit of the NADH dehydrogenase (ubiquinone) complex, located in the mitochondrial inner membrane. It is also known as Complex I and is the largest of the five complexes of the electron transport chain. NDUFB11 mutations have been associated with linear skin defects with multiple congenital anomalies 3 and mitochondrial complex I deficiency.

== Gene ==
The NDUFB11 gene is located on the p arm of chromosome X in position 11.23 and is 2,994 base pairs long.

== Protein ==
The NDUFB11 protein weighs 17 kDa and is composed of 153 amino acids. NDUFB11 is a subunit of the enzyme NADH dehydrogenase (ubiquinone), the largest of the respiratory complexes.

== Structure ==
The structure is L-shaped with a long, hydrophobic transmembrane domain and a hydrophilic domain for the peripheral arm that includes all the known redox centers and the NADH binding site. It has been noted that the N-terminal hydrophobic domain has the potential to be folded into an alpha helix spanning the inner mitochondrial membrane with a C-terminal hydrophilic domain interacting with globular subunits of Complex I. The highly conserved two-domain structure suggests that this feature is critical for the protein function and that the hydrophobic domain acts as an anchor for the NADH dehydrogenase (ubiquinone) complex at the inner mitochondrial membrane.

== Function ==
The protein encoded by this gene is an accessory subunit of the multisubunit NADH:ubiquinone oxidoreductase (complex I) that is not directly involved in catalysis. Mammalian complex I is composed of 45 different subunits. It locates at the mitochondrial inner membrane. This protein complex has NADH dehydrogenase activity and oxidoreductase activity. It transfers electrons from NADH to the respiratory chain. The immediate electron acceptor for the enzyme is believed to be ubiquinone. Alternative splicing occurs at this locus and two transcript variants encoding distinct isoforms have been identified. Initially, NADH binds to Complex I and transfers two electrons to the isoalloxazine ring of the flavin mononucleotide (FMN) prosthetic arm to form FMNH_{2}. The electrons are transferred through a series of iron-sulfur (Fe-S) clusters in the prosthetic arm and finally to coenzyme Q10 (CoQ), which is reduced to ubiquinol (CoQH_{2}). The flow of electrons changes the redox state of the protein, resulting in a conformational change and pK shift of the ionizable side chain, which pumps four hydrogen ions out of the mitochondrial matrix.

== Clinical significance ==
Mutations in the human gene are associated with linear skin defects with mitochondrial complex I deficiency and microphthalmia with linear skin defects syndrome. Mitochondrial complex I deficiency is a disorder of the mitochondrial respiratory chain that causes a wide range of clinical manifestations from lethal neonatal disease to adult-onset neurodegenerative disorders. In cases of pathogenic NDUFB11 mutations, complex I deficiency with lactic acidosis and sideroblastic anemia has been found to occur. Mutations in NDUFB11 have also been linked to microphthalmia with linear skin defects syndrome with neurological and cardiac abnormalities.

== Interactions ==
NDUFB11 has been shown to have 55 binary protein-protein interactions including 32 co-complex interactions. NDUFB11 appears to interact with FATE1, GPR42, CLDN7, GJB1, HIBADH, EBP, GPR152, GPR101, TIMMDC1, TIMMDC1, PPBP, and CRELD2.
