= HCCS (gene) =

Protein-coding gene in humans

Identifiers
- Aliases: HCCS, CCHL, MCOPS7, MLS, LSDMCA1, holocytochrome c synthase
- External IDs: OMIM: 300056; MGI: 106911; GeneCards: HCCS
Enzyme activity
EC #	BRENDA	ExPASy	KEGG	MetaCyc
4.4.1.17	↗	↗	↗	↗

Gene location (Human)
Chr.	X chromosome (human)
Band	Xp22.2	Start	11,111,301 bp
Band	Xp22.2	End	11,123,086 bp

Gene location (Mouse)
Chr.	X chromosome (mouse)
Band	X|X F5	Start	168,033,189 bp
Band	X|X F5	End	168,103,368 bp
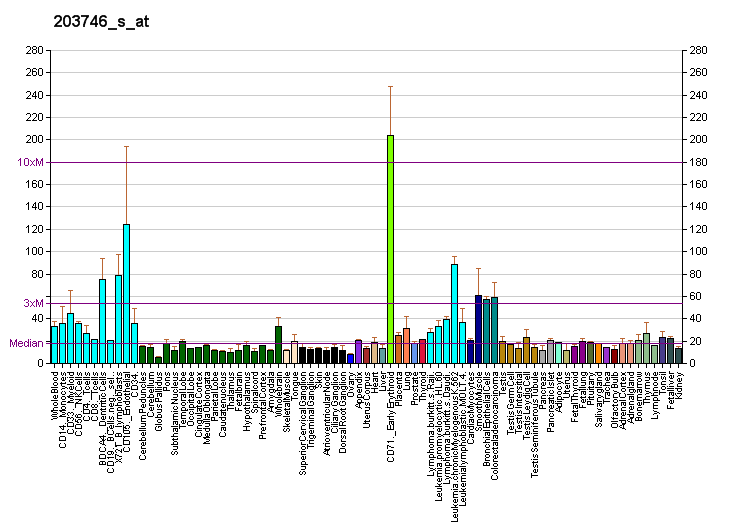

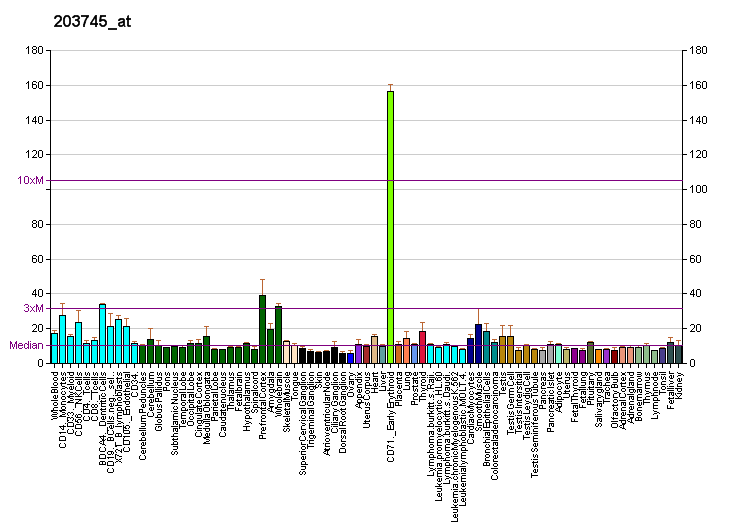
RNA expression pattern
Bgee	Human / Mouse (ortholog); Top expressed in: Skeletal muscle tissue of biceps brachii; gastrocnemius muscle; muscle of thigh; right ventricle; mucosa of transverse colon; Skeletal muscle tissue of rectus abdominis; vastus lateralis muscle; left ventricle; deltoid muscle; gonad / Top expressed in: right ventricle; digastric muscle; atrioventricular valve; myocardium of ventricle; sternocleidomastoid muscle; interventricular septum; temporal muscle; soleus muscle; intercostal muscle; cumulus cell; More reference expression data
BioGPS	More reference expression data
Gene ontology
Molecular function	metal ion binding; lyase activity; holocytochrome-c synthase activity
Cellular component	mitochondrion; mitochondrial inner membrane; membrane
Biological process	animal organ morphogenesis; cytochrome c-heme linkage
Sources:Amigo / QuickGO
Orthologs
Databases	NCBI: entry; OMA: entry
Species	Human	Mouse
Entrez	3052	15159
Ensembl	ENSG00000004961	ENSMUSG00000031352
UniProt	P53701	P53702
RefSeq (mRNA)	NM_005333; NM_001122608; NM_001171991	NM_008222; NM_001331049; NM_001331050
RefSeq (protein)	NP_001116080; NP_001165462; NP_005324	NP_001317978; NP_001317979; NP_032248
Location (UCSC)	Chr X: 11.11 – 11.12 Mb	Chr X: 168.03 – 168.1 Mb
PubMed search
- Wikidata
View/Edit Human	View/Edit Mouse

Holocytochrome c-type synthase is an enzyme that in humans is encoded by the HCCS gene on chromosome X.

== Structure ==
The HCCS gene is located on the Xp22 region of chromosome X and encodes a protein that is ~30 kDa in size. The HCCS protein is localized to the inner mitochondrial membrane and is expressed in multiple tissue including prominently in the cardiovascular system and the central nervous system.

== Function ==
The HCCS protein functions as a lyase to covalently attach the heme group to the apoprotein of cytochrome c on the inner mitochondrial membrane of the mitochondrion. The heme group is required for cytochrome c to transport electrons from complex III to complex IV of the electron transport chain during respiration. Heme attachment to cytochrome c takes place in the intermembrane space and requires conserved heme-interacting residues on HCCS on one of the two heme-binding domains on HCCS, including His154. The HCCS protein may function to regulate mitochondrial lipid and total mitochondrial mass in response to mitochondrial dysfunctions.

== Clinical significance ==
Mutations in the HCCS gene cause microphthalmia with linear skin defects (MLS) syndrome, also known as MIDAS syndrome, microphthalmia, syndromic 7 (MCOPS7), or microphthalmia, dermal aplasia, and sclerocornea. MLS is a rare X-linked dominant male-lethal disease characterized by unilateral or bilateral microphthalmia and linear skin defects in affected females, and in utero lethality for affected males.
