= Microphthalmia, syndromic 12 (MCOPS12) =

Microphthalmia, syndromic 12 (MCOPS12) is an ultra-rare and complex neurological disease. It is caused by a single-point missense mutation in the retinoic acid receptor beta (RARB) gene. The most common disease symptoms are microphthalmia, severe (progressive) movement disorders and intellectual disability. Movement disorders may include spasticity, dystonia and chorea. In addition, malformations such as incomplete lung development (pulmonary hypoplasia), defects of the cerebellum (Chiari type I malformation), and a defect/hole in the diaphragm (diaphragmatic hernia) have been observed.

== Gene ==
The retinoic acid receptor beta (RARB) gene (Gene ID: 5915) is located on the short (p) arm of chromosome 3 (3p24.2). It consists of 13 exons, four promoter regions and has a size of 423 kb in humans. RARB encodes retinoic acid receptor beta (RAR-beta), which belongs to the retinoic acid receptor family together with the other sub-types RAR-alpha and RAR-gamma. Several variations of the single point mutation have been identified, with mutation c.1159C>T (p.R387C) being most prominent (i.e. cytosine is replaced by thymine in nucleotide 1159 causing arginine (R) at amino acid position 387 to be replaced by cysteine (C) in RAR-beta). The respective variant impacts the disease phenotype, thus leading to heterogenous characteristics of the disease depending on the variant of the mutation.

RAR-beta is a nuclear receptor and transcription factor. Upon activation by retinoic acid (the biologically active form of vitamin A), it regulates the expression of a plethora of genes in the human body. It plays a pivotal role in the development of the embryonic digestive tract, eye, myogenesis, and brain (especially the striatum). Furthermore, RAR-beta is a tumor suppressor and hence has been in the focus of cancer therapy for almost two decades.

== Research ==
Mutations in the RAR-beta protein lead to MCOPS12 with pleiotropic defects of an unknown cause. The mutations in RAR-beta most likely result in conformational changes of the receptor’s ligand binding domain, hence to altered ligand binding and transcriptional activity of the receptor. These could be loss of function, reduction in function, or gain of normal function.

Movement disorders are typically explained by some dysfunction in the striatum, which forms a critical part of the motor control system in the brain. Information input comes from the hindbrain by dopaminergic neurons, which connect to medium spiny neurons (MSN) in the striatum. The striatum contains two distinct types of MSNs (D1R and D2R) that carry information to different brain regions. Both D1R and D2R are dopamine receptors.

RAR-beta is a transcription factor and the D2R dopamine receptor is one of its targets. It is hypothesized that changes in RAR-beta transcriptional activity change MSN gene expression, protein composition, and metabolic activity thus leading to the observed neurological disorders.

The RAinRARE consortium federates research teams from four academic institutions to establish disease models and determine the mechanism through which mutant forms of RAR-beta affect striatum functions. Ultimately, the consortium aims to develop therapeutic approaches for MCOPS12 and robust biomarkers for monitoring the efficiency of these approaches. The teams have obtained funding by the European Union via the E-Rare platform to support this research program.

== Patient advocacy ==
Cure MCOPS12 is a non-profit organization which was established in 2020 in Austria. Its mission is to raise awareness and fundraising to support scientific research and clinical development that will ultimately result in a cure. Amongst others, Cure MCOPS12 has funded a Natural History Study for MCOPS12 patients, which is scheduled to start in 2021.
