= CRIM1 =

Protein-coding gene in humans

Identifiers
- Aliases: CRIM1, CRIM-1, S52, cysteine rich transmembrane BMP regulator 1 (chordin-like), cysteine rich transmembrane BMP regulator 1
- External IDs: OMIM: 606189; MGI: 1354756; GeneCards: CRIM1

Gene location (Human)
Chr.	Chromosome 2 (human)
Band	2p22.2	Start	36,355,778 bp
Band	2p22.2	End	36,551,135 bp

Gene location (Mouse)
Chr.	Chromosome 17 (mouse)
Band	17|17 E2- E3	Start	78,507,677 bp
Band	17|17 E2- E3	End	78,684,021 bp
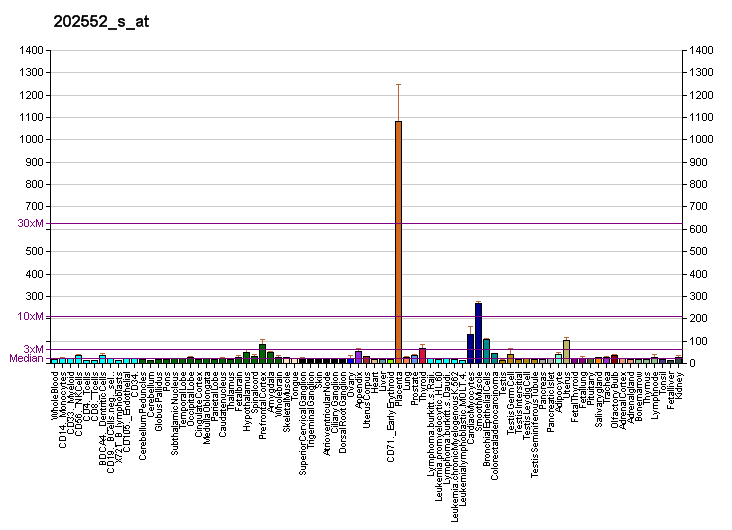

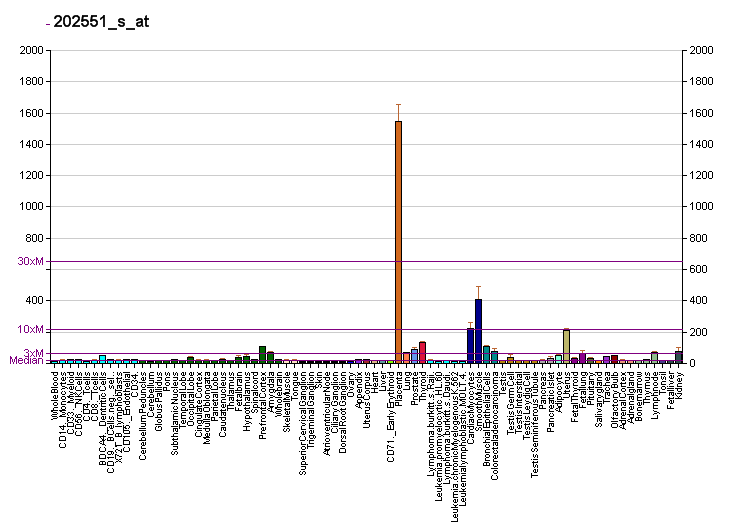
RNA expression pattern
Bgee	Human / Mouse (ortholog); Top expressed in: saphenous vein; renal medulla; superficial temporal artery; lactiferous duct; pericardium; glomerulus; germinal epithelium; metanephric glomerulus; urethra; vena cava / Top expressed in: retinal pigment epithelium; epithelium of lens; decidua; gastrula; vestibular membrane of cochlear duct; lateral geniculate nucleus; medial dorsal nucleus; intercostal muscle; medial geniculate nucleus; ciliary body; More reference expression data
BioGPS	More reference expression data
Gene ontology
Molecular function	enzyme inhibitor activity; PDZ domain binding; insulin-like growth factor binding; insulin-like growth factor-activated receptor activity; serine-type endopeptidase inhibitor activity
Cellular component	integral component of membrane; extracellular region; plasma membrane; membrane
Biological process	negative regulation of catalytic activity; regulation of cell growth; nervous system development; negative regulation of endopeptidase activity; insulin-like growth factor receptor signaling pathway
Sources:Amigo / QuickGO
Orthologs
Databases	NCBI: entry; OMA: entry
Species	Human	Mouse
Entrez	51232	50766
Ensembl	ENSG00000277354; ENSG00000150938	ENSMUSG00000024074
UniProt	Q9NZV1	Q9JLL0
RefSeq (mRNA)	NM_016441	NM_015800
RefSeq (protein)	NP_057525	NP_056615
Location (UCSC)	Chr 2: 36.36 – 36.55 Mb	Chr 17: 78.51 – 78.68 Mb
PubMed search
- Wikidata
View/Edit Human	View/Edit Mouse

Cysteine-rich motor neuron 1 protein is a protein that in humans is encoded by the CRIM1 gene.

== Function ==
Motor neurons are among the earliest neurons to appear after the commencement of cell patterning and the beginning of cell differentiation. Differentiation occurs in a ventral-to-dorsal gradient and is mediated, at least in part, by the concentration of ventrally expressed sonic hedgehog protein (SHH; MIM 600725). Dorsally expressed factors, such as members of the bone morphogenic protein (e.g., BMP4; MIM 112262) and transforming growth factor-beta (e.g., TGFB1; MIM 190180) families, can repress the induction of these neurons. CRIM1 may interact with growth factors implicated in motor neuron differentiation and survival.

== Clinical significance ==
Loss of Crim1 function as demonstrated by the Crim1 KST264 hypomorph mice resulted in onset of chronic kidney disease with accompanying pathology including papillary hypoplasia, functional urinary tract obstruction, ectopic collagen accumulation within the endothelium and tubulointerstitial fibrosis which was in part attributed by (endothelial) epithelial–mesenchymal transition.
