= GPR152 =

Protein-coding gene in the species Homo sapiens

Identifiers
- Aliases: GPR152, PGR5, G protein-coupled receptor 152
- External IDs: MGI: 2685519; GeneCards: GPR152

Gene location (Human)
Chr.	Chromosome 11 (human)
Band	11q13.2	Start	67,451,301 bp
Band	11q13.2	End	67,452,729 bp

Gene location (Mouse)
Chr.	Chromosome 19 (mouse)
Band	19|19 A	Start	4,189,786 bp
Band	19|19 A	End	4,195,739 bp
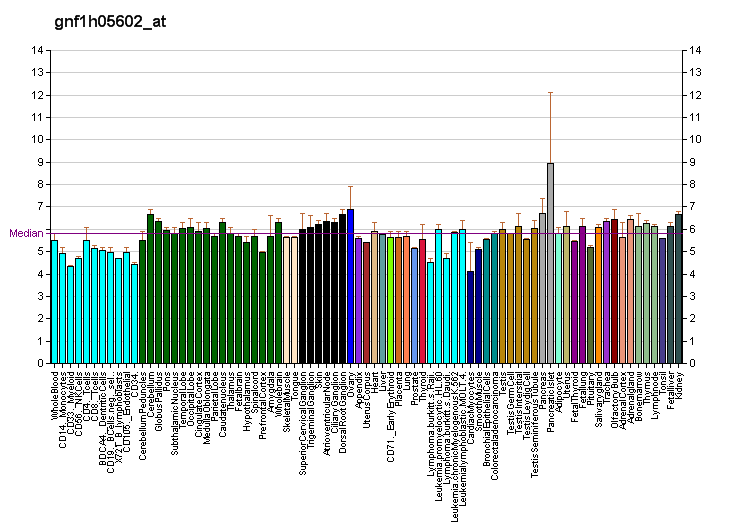
RNA expression pattern
Bgee	Human / Mouse (ortholog); Top expressed in: granulocyte; hemolymphoid system; spleen; intestinal epithelium; lymphatic system; body of stomach; endocrine system; adrenal gland / Top expressed in: neural layer of retina; connective tissue; white adipose tissue; More reference expression data
BioGPS	More reference expression data
Gene ontology
Molecular function	signal transducer activity; G protein-coupled receptor activity
Cellular component	integral component of membrane; plasma membrane; membrane; integral component of plasma membrane
Biological process	G protein-coupled receptor signaling pathway; signal transduction
Sources:Amigo / QuickGO
Orthologs
Databases	NCBI: entry; OMA: entry
Species	Human	Mouse
Entrez	390212	269053
Ensembl	ENSG00000175514	ENSMUSG00000044724
UniProt	Q8TDT2	Q8BXS7
RefSeq (mRNA)	NM_206997	NM_206973
RefSeq (protein)	NP_996880	NP_996856
Location (UCSC)	Chr 11: 67.45 – 67.45 Mb	Chr 19: 4.19 – 4.2 Mb
PubMed search
- Wikidata
View/Edit Human	View/Edit Mouse

Probable G-protein coupled receptor 152 is a protein that in humans is encoded by the GPR152 gene.
