= SALL2 =

Protein-coding gene in the species Homo sapiens

Identifiers
- Aliases: SALL2, COLB, HSAL2, Sal-2, ZNF795, p150(Sal2), spalt-like transcription factor 2, spalt like transcription factor 2
- External IDs: OMIM: 602219; MGI: 1354373; GeneCards: SALL2

Gene location (Human)
Chr.	Chromosome 14 (human)
Band	14q11.2	Start	21,521,080 bp
Band	14q11.2	End	21,537,216 bp

Gene location (Mouse)
Chr.	Chromosome 14 (mouse)
Band	14|14 C2	Start	52,548,629 bp
Band	14|14 C2	End	52,566,219 bp
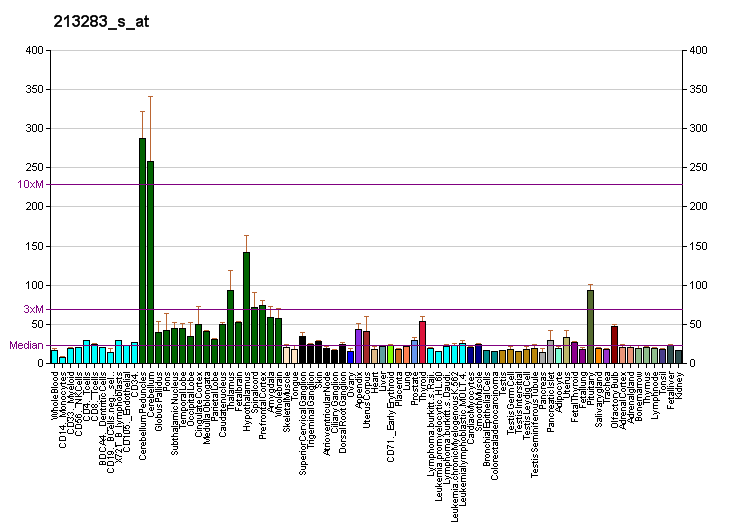
RNA expression pattern
Bgee	Human / Mouse (ortholog); Top expressed in: cerebellar vermis; superior vestibular nucleus; paraflocculus of cerebellum; ventral tegmental area; ventricular zone; inferior olivary nucleus; right hemisphere of cerebellum; dorsal motor nucleus of vagus nerve; pons; oocyte / Top expressed in: vestibular sensory epithelium; otic vesicle; saccule; dorsomedial hypothalamic nucleus; otic placode; median eminence; supraoptic nucleus; inferior colliculi; habenula; arcuate nucleus; More reference expression data
BioGPS	More reference expression data
Gene ontology
Molecular function	DNA-binding transcription factor activity; sequence-specific DNA binding; DNA binding; protein binding; metal ion binding; nucleic acid binding; RNA polymerase II transcription regulatory region sequence-specific DNA binding; DNA-binding transcription activator activity, RNA polymerase II-specific; DNA-binding transcription factor activity, RNA polymerase II-specific; protein-containing complex binding
Cellular component	NuRD complex; nucleus
Biological process	eye development; negative regulation of transcription, DNA-templated; regulation of transcription, DNA-templated; negative regulation of transcription by RNA polymerase II; transcription by RNA polymerase II; neural tube development; signal transduction; transcription, DNA-templated; positive regulation of transcription by RNA polymerase II
Sources:Amigo / QuickGO
Orthologs
Databases	NCBI: entry; OMA: entry
Species	Human	Mouse
Entrez	6297	50524
Ensembl	ENSG00000165821	ENSMUSG00000049532
UniProt	Q9Y467	Q9QX96
RefSeq (mRNA)	NM_001291446; NM_001291447; NM_005407; NM_001364564	NM_001244916; NM_015772
RefSeq (protein)	NP_001278375; NP_001278376; NP_005398; NP_001351493	NP_001231845; NP_056587
Location (UCSC)	Chr 14: 21.52 – 21.54 Mb	Chr 14: 52.55 – 52.57 Mb
PubMed search
- Wikidata
View/Edit Human	View/Edit Mouse

Sal-like protein 2 is a protein that in humans is encoded by the SALL2 gene.
