= PRSS56 =

Protein-coding gene in the species Homo sapiens

Identifiers
- Aliases: PRSS56, MCOP6, protease, serine 56, serine protease 56
- External IDs: OMIM: 613858; MGI: 1916703; GeneCards: PRSS56

Gene location (Human)
Chr.	Chromosome 2 (human)
Band	2q37.1	Start	232,520,388 bp
Band	2q37.1	End	232,525,716 bp

Gene location (Mouse)
Chr.	Chromosome 1 (mouse)
Band	1|1 C5	Start	87,111,035 bp
Band	1|1 C5	End	87,116,127 bp
RNA expression pattern
Bgee	Human / Mouse (ortholog); Top expressed in: muscle of thigh; gastrocnemius muscle; skeletal muscle tissue; hypothalamus; primary visual cortex; substantia nigra; putamen; nucleus accumbens; prefrontal cortex; dorsolateral prefrontal cortex / Top expressed in: seminiferous tubule; spinal nerve; spermatocyte; spermatid; vestibular sensory epithelium; superior frontal gyrus; embryo; optic nerve; olfactory bulb; otic vesicle; More reference expression data
BioGPS	n/a
Gene ontology
Molecular function	serine-type endopeptidase activity; peptidase activity; hydrolase activity; serine-type peptidase activity
Cellular component	endoplasmic reticulum; extracellular space
Biological process	proteolysis; camera-type eye development
Sources:Amigo / QuickGO
Orthologs
Databases	NCBI: entry; OMA: entry
Species	Human	Mouse
Entrez	646960	69453
Ensembl	ENSG00000237412	ENSMUSG00000036480
UniProt	P0CW18	F2YMG0
RefSeq (mRNA)	NM_001195129; NM_001369848	NM_027084
RefSeq (protein)	NP_001182058; NP_001356777	NP_081360
Location (UCSC)	Chr 2: 232.52 – 232.53 Mb	Chr 1: 87.11 – 87.12 Mb
PubMed search
- Wikidata
View/Edit Human	View/Edit Mouse

Putative Serine Protease 56 (PRSS56) is a serine protease that in humans is encoded by the PRSS56 gene. This protein has been implicated in human eye development.

== Genomics ==
The gene is located on long arm of chromosome 2 (2q37.1). The encoded protein is 603 amino acid residues in length with a predicted molecular weight of 64 597 daltons.

The protein contains a peptidase S1 domain and possesses trypsin like serine protease activity.

== Clinical ==
Mutations in this gene are a cause of autosomal recessive posterior microphthalmos. The clinical features of this condition include extreme hyperopia due to short axial length with essentially normal anterior segment, steep corneal curvatures, shallow anterior chamber, thick lenses and thickened scleral walls. The palpebral fissures appear narrow because of relatively deep set eyes. Visual acuity is mildly to moderately reduced, and anisometropic or strabismic amblyopia is common. The fundus of the eye shows crowded optical discs, tortuous vessels and an abnormal foveal avascular zone.

== Disease Model ==
Mice homozygous for an ENU induced mutation show increased intraocular pressure, reduction in eye axial length, and narrow iridocorneal angles. Eyes from individuals with angle-closure glaucoma (ACG) often have a modestly decreased axial length, shallow anterior chamber and relatively large lens, features that predispose to angle closure. Homozygous mice model ACG.
