= MAB21L2 =

Protein-coding gene in the species Homo sapiens

Identifiers
- Aliases: MAB21L2, MCOPS14, Mab-21-like 2 (C. elegans), mab-21 like 2, MCSKS14
- External IDs: OMIM: 604357; MGI: 1346022; HomoloGene: 7824; GeneCards: MAB21L2; OMA:MAB21L2 - orthologs

Gene location (Human)
| Chr. | Chromosome 4 (human) |
| Band | 4q31.3 | Start | 150,582,151 bp |
| Band | 4q31.3 | End | 150,584,693 bp |

Gene location (Mouse)
| Chr. | Chromosome 3 (mouse) |
| Band | 3|3 F1 | Start | 86,452,888 bp |
| Band | 3|3 F1 | End | 86,455,936 bp |
RNA expression pattern
| Bgee | Human / Mouse (ortholog); Top expressed in: muscle layer of sigmoid colon; Pons; retinal pigment epithelium; dorsal motor nucleus of vagus nerve; synovial joint; superior vestibular nucleus; transverse colon; Achilles tendon; cecum; optic nerve / Top expressed in: maxillary prominence; mandibular prominence; abdominal wall; superior cervical ganglion; hand; lens; medial vestibular nucleus; neural layer of retina; iris; embryonic cell; More reference expression data |
| BioGPS | n/a |
Gene ontology
| Molecular function | protein binding |
| Cellular component | nucleus; cytoplasm |
| Biological process | eye development; multicellular organism development; camera-type eye development; nervous system development; positive regulation of cell population proliferation; embryonic body morphogenesis |
Sources:Amigo / QuickGO
Orthologs
| Species | Human | Mouse |
| Entrez | 10586 | 23937 |
| Ensembl | ENSG00000181541 | ENSMUSG00000057777 |
| UniProt | Q9Y586 | Q8BPP1 |
| RefSeq (mRNA) | NM_006439 | NM_011839 |
| RefSeq (protein) | NP_006430 | NP_035969 |
| Location (UCSC) | Chr 4: 150.58 – 150.58 Mb | Chr 3: 86.45 – 86.46 Mb |
| PubMed search |
- Wikidata
| View/Edit Human | View/Edit Mouse |

Mab-21-like 2 (C. elegans) is a protein that in humans is encoded by the MAB21L2 gene.

== Function ==
This gene is similar to the C. elegans MAB-21 cell fate-determining gene, a downstream target of transforming growth factor-beta signaling. It is thought that this gene may be involved in neural development. The protein encoded by this gene is primarily nuclear, although some cytoplasmic localization has been observed. [provided by RefSeq, Jul 2008].
