= Family with sequence similarity 111 member A =

Protein-coding gene in the species Homo sapiens

FAM111A

Identifiers
- Aliases: FAM111A, GCLEB, KCS2, family with sequence similarity 111 member A
- External IDs: OMIM: 615292; MGI: 1915508; GeneCards: FAM111A

Gene location (Human)
Chr.	Chromosome 11 (human)
Band	11q12.1	Start	59,142,748 bp
Band	11q12.1	End	59,155,039 bp

Gene location (Mouse)
Chr.	Chromosome 19 (mouse)
Band	19 A|19	Start	12,523,104 bp
Band	19 A|19	End	12,567,132 bp
RNA expression pattern
Bgee	Human / Mouse (ortholog); Top expressed in: monocyte; granulocyte; tendon of biceps brachii; right uterine tube; trabecular bone; ventricular zone; lymph node; spleen; Achilles tendon; prostate / Top expressed in: granulocyte; fetal liver hematopoietic progenitor cell; tibiofemoral joint; otic vesicle; spleen; dermis; mesenteric lymph nodes; otic placode; saccule; endothelial cell of lymphatic vessel; More reference expression data
BioGPS	n/a
Gene ontology
Molecular function	protein binding
Cellular component	cytoplasm; chromatin; nucleus; fibrillar center
Biological process	DNA replication; negative regulation of viral genome replication; viral process; defense response to virus
Sources:Amigo / QuickGO
Orthologs
Databases	NCBI: entry; OMA: entry
Species	Human	Mouse
Entrez	63901	107373
Ensembl	ENSG00000166801	ENSMUSG00000024691
UniProt	Q96PZ2	Q9D2L9
RefSeq (mRNA)	NM_198847; NM_001142519; NM_001142520; NM_001142521; NM_001312909 NM_001312910; NM_001312911; NM_022074; NM_001369455; NM_001369456; NM_001369457	NM_026640; NM_001346545
RefSeq (protein)	NP_001135991; NP_001135992; NP_001135993; NP_001299838; NP_001299839 NP_001299840; NP_071357; NP_942144; NP_001356386; NP_001361733; NP_001361777; NP_001361778; NP_001361779; NP_001361780; NP_001361781; NP_001361782; NP_001361783; NP_001361784; NP_001361785; NP_001361786; NP_001361787; NP_001361788; NP_001361789; NP_001361790; NP_001361791; NP_001361792; NP_001361793; NP_001361794; NP_001361795; NP_001361796; NP_001361797; NP_001361798; NP_001361799	NP_001333474; NP_080916
Location (UCSC)	Chr 11: 59.14 – 59.16 Mb	Chr 19: 12.52 – 12.57 Mb
PubMed search
- Wikidata
View/Edit Human	View/Edit Mouse

Family with sequence similarity 111 member A is a protein that in humans is encoded by the FAM111A gene.

== Function ==
The protein encoded by this gene is cell-cycle regulated, and has nuclear localization. The C-terminal half of the protein shares homology with trypsin-like peptidases and it contains a PCNA-interacting peptide (PIP) box that is necessary for its co-localization with proliferating cell nuclear antigen (PCNA). Reduced expression of this gene resulted in DNA replication defects, consistent with the demonstrated role for this gene in Simian Virus 40 (SV40) viral replication. Monoallelic variants in this gene have been associated with dominantly inherited Kenny-Caffey syndrome (KCS; MIM 127000) and the more severe osteocraniostenosis (OCS; MIM 602361), both characterized by short stature, hypoparathyroidism, bone development abnormalities, and hypocalcemia. Alternative splicing of the FAM111A transcript results in multiple transcript variants. [provided by RefSeq, Aug 2015].
