= NHS (gene) =

Protein-coding gene in the species Homo sapiens

Identifiers
- Aliases: NHS, CTRCT40, CXN, SCML1, NHS actin remodeling regulator
- External IDs: OMIM: 300457; MGI: 2684894; HomoloGene: 18866; GeneCards: NHS; OMA:NHS - orthologs

Gene location (Human)
| Chr. | X chromosome (human) |
| Band | Xp22.2-p22.13 | Start | 17,375,200 bp |
| Band | Xp22.2-p22.13 | End | 17,735,994 bp |

Gene location (Mouse)
| Chr. | X chromosome (mouse) |
| Band | X F4|X 74.17 cM | Start | 160,616,292 bp |
| Band | X F4|X 74.17 cM | End | 160,942,726 bp |
RNA expression pattern
| Bgee | Human / Mouse (ortholog); Top expressed in: buccal mucosa cell; endothelial cell; pancreatic epithelial cell; palpebral conjunctiva; visceral pleura; germinal epithelium; mucosa of paranasal sinus; Brodmann area 23; caput epididymis; endometrium / Top expressed in: lens; zygote; genital tubercle; secondary oocyte; tail of embryo; primary oocyte; ventricular zone; epiblast; human kidney; vasculature; More reference expression data |
| BioGPS | n/a |
Orthologs
| Species | Human | Mouse |
| Entrez | 4810 | 195727 |
| Ensembl | ENSG00000188158 | ENSMUSG00000059493 |
| UniProt | Q6T4R5 | n/a |
| RefSeq (mRNA) | NM_001136024; NM_001291867; NM_001291868; NM_198270 | NM_001081052; NM_001290526 |
| RefSeq (protein) | NP_001129496; NP_001278796; NP_001278797; NP_938011 | n/a |
| Location (UCSC) | Chr X: 17.38 – 17.74 Mb | Chr X: 160.62 – 160.94 Mb |
| PubMed search |
- Wikidata
| View/Edit Human | View/Edit Mouse |

Nance-Horan syndrome protein is a protein that in humans is encoded by the NHS gene.

This gene encodes a protein containing four conserved nuclear localization signals. The encoded protein may function during the development of the eyes, teeth, and brain. Mutations in this gene have been shown to cause Nance-Horan syndrome. An alternative splice variant has been described, but its full-length nature has not been determined.
