= HMGB3 =

Protein-coding gene in the species Homo sapiens

Identifiers
- Aliases: HMGB3, HMG-2a, HMG-4, HMG2A, HMG4, high mobility group box 3
- External IDs: OMIM: 300193; MGI: 1098219; GeneCards: HMGB3
Available structures
PDB	Ortholog search: PDBe RCSB
PDB	List of PDB id codes 2EQZ, 2YQI

Gene location (Human)
Chr.	X chromosome (human)
Band	Xq28	Start	150,980,509 bp
Band	Xq28	End	150,990,771 bp

Gene location (Mouse)
Chr.	X chromosome (mouse)
Band	X|X A7.3	Start	70,599,524 bp
Band	X|X A7.3	End	70,604,282 bp
RNA expression pattern
Bgee	Human / Mouse (ortholog); Top expressed in: secondary oocyte; ganglionic eminence; ventricular zone; buccal mucosa cell; placenta; islet of Langerhans; olfactory zone of nasal mucosa; right lobe of liver; mucosa of transverse colon; sural nerve / Top expressed in: ventricular zone; ganglionic eminence; tail of embryo; neural tube; mesencephalon; genital tubercle; lens; adrenal gland; yolk sac; bone marrow; More reference expression data
BioGPS	n/a
Gene ontology
Molecular function	DNA binding; double-stranded DNA binding; DNA binding, bending; protein binding; four-way junction DNA binding; RNA binding; transcription factor binding
Cellular component	cytoplasm; nucleus; chromosome
Biological process	multicellular organism development; immune system process; DNA recombination; innate immune response; regulation of transcription, DNA-templated; transcription, DNA-templated; DNA geometric change; negative regulation of B cell differentiation; negative regulation of myeloid cell differentiation; chromatin remodeling; regulation of transcription by RNA polymerase II; positive regulation of innate immune response; positive regulation of transcription by RNA polymerase II
Sources:Amigo / QuickGO
Orthologs
Databases	NCBI: entry; OMA: entry
Species	Human	Mouse
Entrez	3149	15354
Ensembl	ENSG00000029993	ENSMUSG00000015217
UniProt	O15347	O54879
RefSeq (mRNA)	NM_005342; NM_001301228; NM_001301229; NM_001301231	NM_001293623; NM_001293624; NM_001293625; NM_008253
RefSeq (protein)	NP_001288157; NP_001288158; NP_001288160; NP_005333	NP_001280552; NP_001280553; NP_001280554; NP_032279
Location (UCSC)	Chr X: 150.98 – 150.99 Mb	Chr X: 70.6 – 70.6 Mb
PubMed search
- Wikidata
View/Edit Human	View/Edit Mouse

High-mobility group protein B3 is a protein that in humans is encoded by the HMGB3 gene.
