= FREM1 =

Protein-coding gene in the species Homo sapiens

Identifiers
- Aliases: FREM1, BNAR, C9orf143, C9orf145, C9orf154, MOTA, TILRR, TRIGNO2, FRAS1 related extracellular matrix 1
- External IDs: OMIM: 608944; MGI: 2670972; GeneCards: FREM1

Gene location (Human)
Chr.	Chromosome 9 (human)
Band	9p22.3	Start	14,737,152 bp
Band	9p22.3	End	14,910,995 bp

Gene location (Mouse)
Chr.	Chromosome 4 (mouse)
Band	4|4 C3	Start	82,816,157 bp
Band	4|4 C3	End	82,970,576 bp
RNA expression pattern
Bgee	Human / Mouse (ortholog); Top expressed in: smooth muscle tissue; metanephros; body of uterus; right hemisphere of cerebellum; Descending thoracic aorta; ascending aorta; body of pancreas; popliteal artery; tibial arteries; right coronary artery / Top expressed in: left lung lobe; Epithelium of choroid plexus; otolith organ; utricle; vas deferens; Gonadal ridge; retinal pigment epithelium; vestibular membrane of cochlear duct; ciliary body; dermis; More reference expression data
BioGPS	n/a
Gene ontology
Molecular function	metal ion binding; carbohydrate binding
Cellular component	integral component of membrane; extracellular region; basement membrane
Biological process	multicellular organism development; cell communication; cell-matrix adhesion; cell adhesion; craniofacial suture morphogenesis
Sources:Amigo / QuickGO
Orthologs
Databases	NCBI: entry; OMA: entry
Species	Human	Mouse
Entrez	158326	329872
Ensembl	ENSG00000164946	ENSMUSG00000059049
UniProt	Q5H8C1	Q684R7
RefSeq (mRNA)	NM_001177704; NM_144966; NM_001370058; NM_001370060; NM_001370061 NM_001370063; NM_001370065; NM_001379081	NM_001198811; NM_177863
RefSeq (protein)	NP_001171175; NP_659403; NP_001356987; NP_001356989; NP_001356990 NP_001356992; NP_001356994; NP_001366010	NP_001185740; NP_808531
Location (UCSC)	Chr 9: 14.74 – 14.91 Mb	Chr 4: 82.82 – 82.97 Mb
PubMed search
- Wikidata
View/Edit Human	View/Edit Mouse

FRAS1-related extracellular matrix protein 1 is a protein that in humans is encoded by the FREM1 gene.
