= SNX3 =

Protein-coding gene in the species Homo sapiens

Identifiers
- Aliases: SNX3, Grd19, MCOPS8, SDP3, sorting nexin 3
- External IDs: OMIM: 605930; MGI: 1860188; GeneCards: SNX3
Available structures
| PDB | Ortholog search: PDBe RCSB |
| PDB | List of PDB id codes 2YPS, 2MXC |

Gene location (Human)
| Chr. | Chromosome 6 (human) |
| Band | 6q21 | Start | 108,211,222 bp |
| Band | 6q21 | End | 108,261,246 bp |

Gene location (Mouse)
| Chr. | Chromosome 10 (mouse) |
| Band | 10 B2|10 22.89 cM | Start | 42,378,026 bp |
| Band | 10 B2|10 22.89 cM | End | 42,411,377 bp |
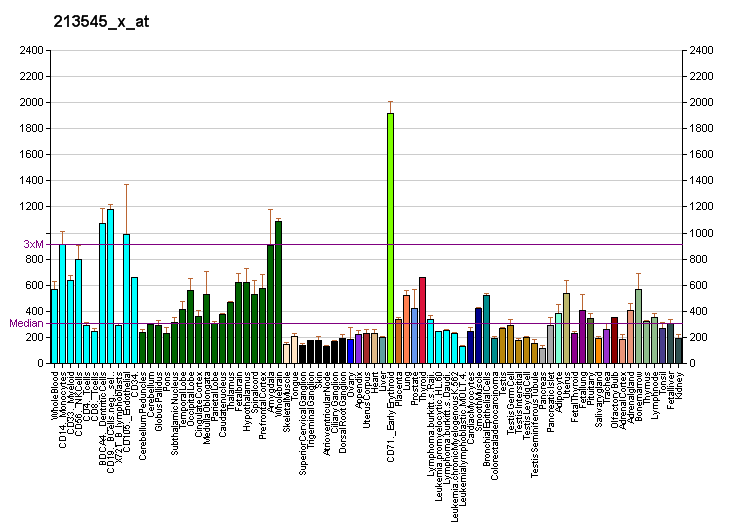

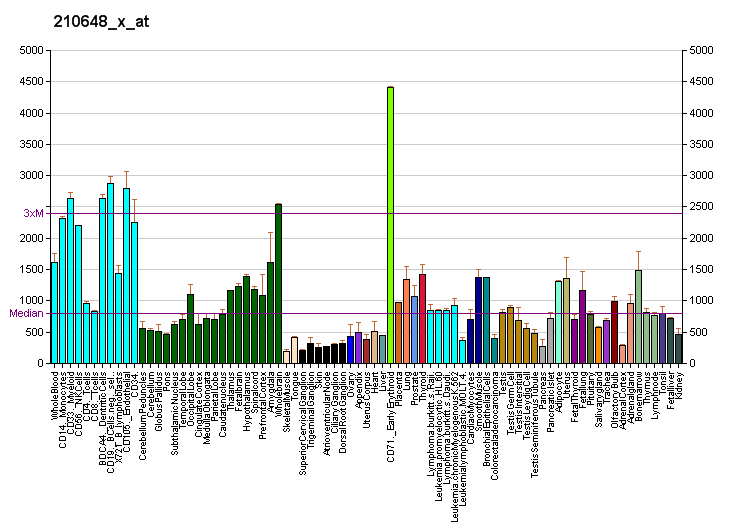
RNA expression pattern
| Bgee | Human / Mouse (ortholog); Top expressed in: trabecular bone; middle temporal gyrus; visceral pleura; parietal pleura; endothelial cell; right ventricle; germinal epithelium; parotid gland; Epithelium of choroid plexus; Brodmann area 23 / Top expressed in: lactiferous gland; CA3 field; pyloric antrum; yolk sac; fetal liver hematopoietic progenitor cell; calvaria; plantaris muscle; facial motor nucleus; perirhinal cortex; entorhinal cortex; More reference expression data |
| BioGPS | More reference expression data |
Gene ontology
| Molecular function | phosphatidylinositol-3-phosphate binding; phosphatidylinositol-3,5-bisphosphate binding; phosphatidylinositol-4-phosphate binding; phosphatidylinositol-5-phosphate binding; protein binding; phosphatidylinositol binding; protein phosphatase binding; lipid binding; phosphatidylinositol phosphate binding |
| Cellular component | cytoplasm; cytosol; endosome; early endosome membrane; early phagosome; retromer complex; early endosome; phagocytic vesicle; extracellular exosome; cytoplasmic vesicle; clathrin-coated vesicle; extrinsic component of membrane; endosome membrane |
| Biological process | protein to membrane docking; negative regulation of viral entry into host cell; negative regulation of phagocytosis; response to bacterium; negative regulation of protein catabolic process; negative regulation of early endosome to late endosome transport; membrane invagination; regulation of Wnt signaling pathway; intralumenal vesicle formation; negative regulation of protein transport; positive regulation of neuron projection development; protein transport; Wnt signaling pathway; protein deubiquitination; transport |
Sources:Amigo / QuickGO
Orthologs
| Databases | NCBI: entry; OMA: entry |
| Species | Human | Mouse |
| Entrez | 8724 | 54198 |
| Ensembl | ENSG00000112335 | ENSMUSG00000019804 |
| UniProt | O60493 | O70492 |
| RefSeq (mRNA) | NM_152828; NM_001300928; NM_001300929; NM_003795; NM_152827 | NM_017472 |
| RefSeq (protein) | NP_001287857; NP_001287858; NP_003786; NP_690040 | n/a |
| Location (UCSC) | Chr 6: 108.21 – 108.26 Mb | Chr 10: 42.38 – 42.41 Mb |
| PubMed search |
- Wikidata
| View/Edit Human | View/Edit Mouse |

Sorting nexin-3 is a protein that in humans is encoded by the SNX3 gene.

This gene encodes a member of the sorting nexin family. Members of this family contain a phox (PX) domain, which is a phosphoinositide binding domain, and are involved in intracellular trafficking. This protein does not contain a coiled coil region, like most family members. This protein interacts with phosphatidylinositol-3-phosphate, and is involved in protein trafficking.
