= VAX1 =

Protein-coding gene in the species Homo sapiens

Identifiers
- Aliases: VAX1, MCOPS11, ventral anterior homeobox 1
- External IDs: OMIM: 604294; MGI: 1277163; GeneCards: VAX1

Gene location (Human)
Chr.	Chromosome 10 (human)
Band	10q25.3	Start	117,128,521 bp
Band	10q25.3	End	117,138,301 bp

Gene location (Mouse)
Chr.	Chromosome 19 (mouse)
Band	19 D3|19 54.61 cM	Start	59,154,619 bp
Band	19 D3|19 54.61 cM	End	59,158,488 bp
RNA expression pattern
Bgee	Human / Mouse (ortholog); Top expressed in: testicle; caudate nucleus; nucleus accumbens; putamen; prefrontal cortex; gonad; hypothalamus; Brodmann area 9; anterior cingulate cortex; superior frontal gyrus / Top expressed in: Rostral migratory stream; medial ganglionic eminence; suprachiasmatic nucleus; optic stalk; nasal placode; embryo; lumbar subsegment of spinal cord; paraventricular nucleus of hypothalamus; optic chiasm; embryo; More reference expression data
BioGPS	n/a
Gene ontology
Molecular function	DNA-binding transcription factor activity; DNA binding; sequence-specific DNA binding; chromatin DNA binding; DNA-binding transcription repressor activity, RNA polymerase II-specific; RNA polymerase II intronic transcription regulatory region sequence-specific DNA binding; DNA-binding transcription factor activity, RNA polymerase II-specific
Cellular component	nucleus
Biological process	axon guidance; skeletal muscle cell differentiation; multicellular organism development; roof of mouth development; camera-type eye development; central nervous system development; cell differentiation; brain development; neuron migration; negative regulation of transcription by RNA polymerase II; regulation of transcription, DNA-templated; transcription, DNA-templated; nervous system development; negative regulation of neuroblast proliferation
Sources:Amigo / QuickGO
Orthologs
Databases	NCBI: entry; OMA: entry
Species	Human	Mouse
Entrez	11023	22326
Ensembl	ENSG00000148704	ENSMUSG00000006270
UniProt	Q5SQQ9	Q2NKI2
RefSeq (mRNA)	NM_199131; NM_001112704	NM_009501
RefSeq (protein)	NP_001106175; NP_954582	NP_033527
Location (UCSC)	Chr 10: 117.13 – 117.14 Mb	Chr 19: 59.15 – 59.16 Mb
PubMed search
- Wikidata
View/Edit Human	View/Edit Mouse

Ventral anterior homeobox 1 is a protein that in humans is encoded by the VAX1 gene.

== Function ==
This gene appears to influence the development in humans of the forebrain. It is also present in mice and xenopus frogs, which suggests a long evolutionary history, and in those organisms its expression is confined to the forebrain, optic and olfactory areas.

VAX1 gene is a transcription factor that has a homeodomain located in the 100-159 amino acid position and an Ala–rich region located in 216-253 amino acid position of the gene. Expression studies in mice show that it is expressed in the palate, coloboma in the visual system, and the basal telencephalon, optic stalk, and visual eye fields where it is expressed along with the Shh and Bmp4 genes.

== Clinical significance ==
Mice with homozygous VAX1 mutations have been reported to display craniofacial malformations including cleft palate.

Genome Wide Association Studies (GWAS) reported significant associations between non-syndromic clefts and SNPs in the VAX1 gene. Replication studies have confirmed these associations in different population groups
