= BCL-6 corepressor =

Protein-coding gene in humans

BCOR

Identifiers
- Aliases: BCOR, ANOP2, MAA2, MCOPS2, BCL6 corepressor
- External IDs: OMIM: 300485; MGI: 1918708; GeneCards: BCOR
Available structures
PDB	Ortholog search: PDBe RCSB
PDB	List of PDB id codes 3BIM, 4HPL, 2N1L

Gene location (Human)
Chr.	X chromosome (human)
Band	Xp11.4	Start	40,049,815 bp
Band	Xp11.4	End	40,177,329 bp

Gene location (Mouse)
Chr.	X chromosome (mouse)
Band	X|X A1.1	Start	11,902,979 bp
Band	X|X A1.1	End	12,026,594 bp
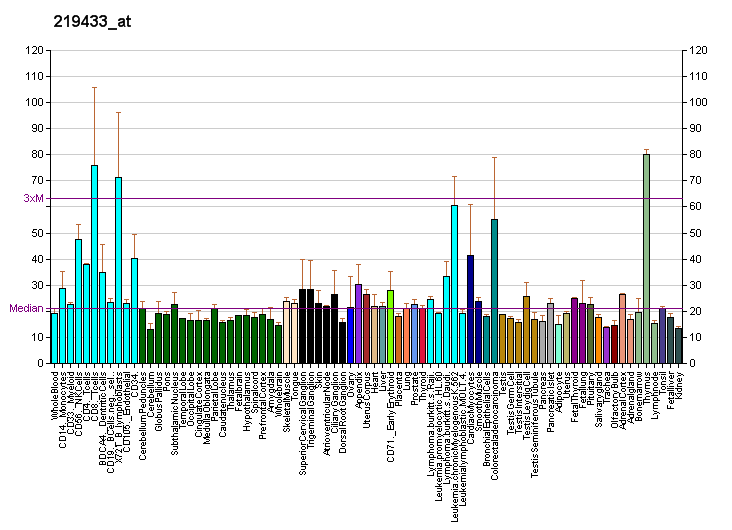
RNA expression pattern
Bgee	Human / Mouse (ortholog); Top expressed in: buccal mucosa cell; ganglionic eminence; ventricular zone; gonad; tibial arteries; gastrocnemius muscle; muscle of thigh; left ovary; islet of Langerhans; Descending thoracic aorta / Top expressed in: hand; tail of embryo; otolith organ; ascending aorta; utricle; submandibular gland; aortic valve; gastrula; lymph node; superior cervical ganglion; More reference expression data
BioGPS	More reference expression data
Gene ontology
Molecular function	heat shock protein binding; transcription factor binding; histone deacetylase binding; ubiquitin-protein transferase activity; protein binding; transcription corepressor activity; RNA polymerase II transcription regulatory region sequence-specific DNA binding
Cellular component	PcG protein complex; nucleus; BCOR complex
Biological process	roof of mouth development; negative regulation of bone mineralization; regulation of transcription, DNA-templated; negative regulation of histone H3-K36 methylation; histone H2A monoubiquitination; negative regulation of tooth mineralization; transcription, DNA-templated; odontogenesis; specification of axis polarity; development of the heart; negative regulation of histone H3-K4 methylation; negative regulation of transcription, DNA-templated; negative regulation of transcription by RNA polymerase II; chromatin organization; blastocyst hatching
Sources:Amigo / QuickGO
Orthologs
Databases	NCBI: entry; OMA: entry
Species	Human	Mouse
Entrez	54880	71458
Ensembl	ENSG00000183337	ENSMUSG00000040363
UniProt	Q6W2J9	Q8CGN4
RefSeq (mRNA)	NM_001123383; NM_001123384; NM_001123385; NM_001130139; NM_017745 NM_020926	NM_001168321; NM_029510; NM_175044; NM_175045; NM_175046
RefSeq (protein)	NP_001116855; NP_001116856; NP_001116857; NP_060215	NP_001161793; NP_083786; NP_778209; NP_778210; NP_778211
Location (UCSC)	Chr X: 40.05 – 40.18 Mb	Chr X: 11.9 – 12.03 Mb
PubMed search
- Wikidata
View/Edit Human	View/Edit Mouse

BCL-6 corepressor is a protein that in humans is encoded by the BCOR gene.

== Function ==
The protein encoded by this gene was identified as an interacting corepressor of BCL6, a POZ/zinc finger transcription repressor that is required for germinal center formation and may influence apoptosis. This protein selectively interacts with the POZ domain of BCL6, but not with eight other POZ proteins. Specific class I and II histone deacetylases (HDACs) have been shown to interact with this protein, which suggests a possible link between the two classes of HDACs. At least four alternatively spliced transcript variants, which encode different isoforms, have been reported for this gene.

== Clinical significance ==
Mutations in the BCOR gene cause a form of syndromic microphthalmia (small eye) called MCOPS2. This syndrome incorporates microphthalmia, congenital cataracts, cardiac defects, dental defects and skeletal anomalies. Mutations in this gene have also been found associated to acute myeloid leukemia.

== Interactions ==
BCOR has been shown to interact with MLLT3 and BCL6.
