= X-linked dominant inheritance =

Mode of inheritance

X-linked dominant inheritance

X-linked dominant inheritance, sometimes referred to as X-linked dominance, is a mode of genetic inheritance by which a dominant gene is carried on the X chromosome. As an inheritance pattern, it is less common than the X-linked recessive type. In medicine, X-linked dominant inheritance indicates that a gene responsible for a genetic disorder is located on the X chromosome, and only one copy of the allele is sufficient to cause the disorder when inherited from a parent who has the disorder. In this case, someone who expresses an X-linked dominant allele will exhibit the disorder and be considered affected. The pattern of inheritance is sometimes called criss-cross inheritance.

X-linked dominant traits do not necessarily affect males more than females (unlike X-linked recessive traits). The exact pattern of inheritance varies, depending on whether the father or the mother has the trait of interest. All fathers that are affected by an X-linked dominant disorder will have affected daughters but not affected sons. However, if the mother is also affected then sons will have a chance of being affected, depending on whether a dominant or recessive X chromosome is passed on. When the son is affected, the mother will always be affected. Some X-linked dominant conditions are embryonic lethal in males, making them appear to only occur in females.

== Genetics ==
As the X chromosome is one of the sex chromosomes (the other being the Y chromosome), X-linked inheritance is determined by the sex of the parent carrying a specific gene and can often seem complex. This is due to the fact that, typically, females have two copies of the X-chromosome, while males have only one copy. The difference between dominant and recessive inheritance patterns also plays a role in determining the chances of a child inheriting an X-linked disorder from their parentage.

X-linked dominant disorders tend to affect females more often because they tend to be developmentally fatal in males. This is because males have only one copy of X-chromosome while females have two copies.

=== Inheritance ===
In X-linked dominant inheritance, when the mother alone is the carrier of a mutated, or defective gene associated with a disease or disorder; she herself will have the disorder. Her children will inherit the disorder as follows:

- Of her daughters and sons: 50% will have the disorder, 50% will be completely unaffected. Children of either sex have an even chance of receiving either of their mother's two X chromosomes, one of which contains the defective gene in question.

When the father alone is the carrier of a defective gene associated with a disease or disorder, he too will have the disorder. His children will inherit the disorder as follows:

- Of his daughters: 100% will have the disorder, since all of his daughters will receive one copy of his single X chromosome.
- Of his sons: none will have the disorder; sons do not receive an X chromosome from their father.

If both parents were carriers of a defective gene associated with a disease or disorder, they would both have the disorder. Their children would inherit the disorder as follows:

- Of their daughters: 100% will have the disorder, since all of the daughters will receive a copy of their father's X chromosome.
- Of the sons: 50% will have the disorder, 50% will be completely unaffected. Sons have an equal chance of receiving either of their mother's X chromosomes.

In such a case, where both parents carry and thus are affected by an X-linked dominant disorder, the chance of a daughter receiving two copies of the X chromosome with the defective gene is 50%, since daughters receive one copy of the X chromosome from both parents. Were this to occur with an X-linked dominant disorder, that daughter would likely experience a more severe form.

Some X-linked dominant conditions such as Aicardi syndrome are fatal to boys; therefore only girls with these conditions survive, or boys with Klinefelter's syndrome (and hence have more than one X chromosome).

A few scholars have suggested discontinuing the use of the terms dominant and recessive when referring to X-linked inheritance, stating that the highly variable penetrance of X-linked traits in females as a result of mechanisms such as skewed X-inactivation or somatic mosaicism is difficult to reconcile with standard definitions of dominance and recessiveness.

== List of dominant X-linked diseases ==
- Vitamin D resistant rickets: X-linked hypophosphatemia
- Rett syndrome (95% of cases are due to sporadic mutations(not inherited))
- Fragile-X syndrome
- Most cases of Alport syndrome
- Incontinentia pigmenti
- Giuffrè–Tsukahara syndrome
- Goltz syndrome
- X-linked dominant porphyria
- Aicardi syndrome
- Beta-propeller protein-associated neurodegeneration

== See also ==
- Sex linkage
- X-linked recessive inheritance
