= List of diseases (A) =

This is a list of diseases starting with the letter "A".

== Aa–Ab ==
- Aagenaes syndrome
- Aarskog–Ose–Pande syndrome
- Aarskog syndrome
- Aase–Smith syndrome
- Aase syndrome
- Abasia
- ABCD syndrome
- Abdallat–Davis–Farrage syndrome
- Abdominal aortic aneurysm
- Abdominal chemodectomas with cutaneous angiolipomas
- Abdominal cystic lymphangioma
- Abdominal defects
- Abdominal musculature absent microphthalmia joint laxity
- Abdominal neoplasm / Abdominal neoplasms
- Aberrant subclavian artery
- Ablepharon macrostomia syndrome
- Abnormal systemic venous return
- Abruzzo–Erickson syndrome
- Absence of gluteal muscle
- Absence of tibia with polydactyly
- Absent corpus callosum cataract immunodeficiency
- Absent tibia-polydactyly-arachnoid cyst syndrome
- Absent T lymphocytes

== Ac ==
- Acanthocheilonemiasis
- Acanthocytosis
- Acanthocytosis chorea
- Acanthosis nigricans
- Acatalasemia
- Accessory deep peroneal nerve
- Accessory navicular bone
- Accessory pancreas

=== Ach–Ack ===
- Achalasia
- Achalasia-Addisonianism-Alacrimia syndrome
- Achalasia alacrimia syndrome
- Achalasia, familial esophageal
- Achalasia microcephaly
- Achard syndrome
- Achard–Thiers syndrome
- Acheiropodia
- Achondrogenesis
  - Achondrogenesis Kozlowski type
  - Achondrogenesis type 1A
  - Achondrogenesis type 1B
  - Achondrogenesis type 2
- Achondroplasia
  - Achondroplasia Swiss type agammaglobulinemia
- Achondroplastic dwarfism
- Achromatopsia
- Achromatopsia incomplete, X-linked
- Acid maltase deficiency
- Acidemia, isovaleric
- Acidemia, propionic
- Acitretine antenatal infection
- Ackerman syndrome

=== Acn–Acq ===
- Acne rosacea
- Acne vulgaris; often called acne
- Acoustic neuroma
- Acoustic schwannomas
- Acquired agranulocytosis
- Acquired central hypoventilation syndrome
- Acquired hypoprothrombinemia
- Acquired ichthyosis
- Acquired prothrombin deficiency
- Acquired syphilis

=== Acr ===
==== Acra ====
- Acral dysostosis dyserythropoiesis
- Acral renal mandibular syndrome

==== Acro ====
- Acro coxo mesomelic dysplasia

===== Acroc–Acrok =====
- Acrocallosal syndrome, Schinzel type
- Acrocephalopolydactyly
- Acrocephalosyndactyly Jackson Weiss type
- Acrocephaly
- Acrocephaly pulmonary stenosis mental retardation
- Acrocyanosis
- Acrodermatitis
- Acrodermatitis enteropathica
- Acrodysostosis
- Acrodysplasia
- Acrodysplasia scoliosis
- Acrofacial dysostosis
- Acrofacial dysostosis ambiguous genitalia
- Acrofacial dysostosis atypical postaxial
- Acrofacial dysostosis Catania form
- Acrofacial dysostosis, Nager type
- Acrofacial dysostosis, Palagonia type
- Acrofacial dysostosis Preis type
- Acrofacial dysostosis Rodriguez type
- Acrofacial dysostosis Weyers type
- Acrofrontofacionasal dysostosis
- Acrokeratoelastoidosis of Costa

===== Acrom–Acros =====
- Acromegaloid changes cutis verticis gyrata corneal
- Acromegaloid facial appearance syndrome
- Acromegaloid hypertrichosis syndrome
- Acromegaly
- Acromesomelic dysplasia
- Acromesomelic dysplasia Brahimi Bacha type
- Acromesomelic dysplasia Campailla Martinelli type
- Acromesomelic dysplasia Hunter Thompson type
- Acromesomelic dysplasia, Maroteaux type
- Acromicric dysplasia
- Acroosteolysis dominant type
- Acroosteolysis neurogenic
- Acroosteolysis osteoporosis skull and mandible changes
- Acropectoral syndrome
- Acropectorenal field defect
- Acropectorovertebral dysplasia
- Acrophobia
- Acropigmentation of Dohi
- Acrorenal syndrome recessive
- Acrorenoocular syndrome
- Acrospiroma

=== Act ===
- ACTH deficiency
- ACTH resistance
- Actinic keratosis
- Actinomycetales causes anal infection
- Actinomycosis
- Activated protein C resistance

=== Acu ===
==== Acut ====
===== Acuta =====
- Acutane embryopathy

===== Acute =====
====== Acute a – Acute l ======
- Acute anxiety
- Acute articular rheumatism
- Acute erythroblastic leukemia
- Acute febrile neutrophilic dermatosis
- Acute gouty arthritis
- Acute idiopathic polyneuritis
- Acute intermittent porphyria
- Acute lymphoblastic leukemia
- Acute lymphoblastic leukemia congenital sporadic aniridia
- Acute lymphocytic leukemia

====== Acute m – Acute p ======
- Acute megakaryoblastic leukemia
- Acute monoblastic leukemia
- Acute monocytic leukemia
- Acute mountain sickness
- Acute myeloblastic leukemia
  - Acute myeloblastic leukemia, minimally differentiated
  - Acute myeloblastic leukemia type 1
  - Acute myeloblastic leukemia type 2
  - Acute myeloblastic leukemia type 3
  - Acute myeloblastic leukemia type 4
  - Acute myeloblastic leukemia type 5
  - Acute myeloblastic leukemia type 6
  - Acute myeloblastic leukemia type 7
  - Acute myeloblastic leukemia with maturation
  - Acute myeloblastic leukemia without maturation
- Acute myelocytic leukemia
- Acute myelogenous leukemia
- Acute myeloid leukemia
  - Acute myeloid leukemia, secondary
- Acute myelomonocytic leukemia
- Acute necrotizing ulcerative gingivitis
- Acute non lymphoblastic leukemia (generic term)
- Acute pancreatitis
- Acute posterior multifocal placoid pigment epitheliopathy
- Acute promyelocytic leukemia

===== Acute r – Acute t =====
- Acute renal failure
- Acute respiratory distress syndrome
- Acute tubular necrosis

=== Acy ===
- Acyl-CoA dehydrogenase, medium chain, deficiency of
- Acyl-CoA dehydrogenase, short chain, deficiency of
- Acyl-CoA dehydrogenase, very long chain, deficiency of
- Acyl-CoA oxidase deficiency

== Ad ==
=== Ada–Adi ===
- Adactylia unilateral dominant
- ADAM complex
- Adams–Nance syndrome
- Adams–Oliver syndrome
- Addison's disease
- Adducted thumb club foot syndrome
- Adducted thumb syndrome recessive form
- Adducted thumbs Dundar type
- Adenine phosphoribosyltransferase deficiency
- Adenocarcinoid tumor
- Adenocarcinoma of esophagus
- Adenocarcinoma of lung
- Adenoid cystic carcinoma
- Adenoma
- Adenoma of the adrenal gland
- Adenomatoid odontogenic tumor
- Adenomyosis
- Adenosine deaminase deficiency
- Adenosine monophosphate deaminase deficiency
- Adenosine triphosphatase deficiency, anemia due to
- Adenylosuccinate lyase deficiency
- Adie syndrome
- Adiposis dolorosa, a.k.a. Dercum's disease

=== Ado–Adr ===
- Adolescent benign focal crisis
- Adrenal adenoma, familial
- Adrenal cancer
- Adrenal disorder
- Adrenal gland hyperfunction
- Adrenal gland hypofunction
- Adrenal hyperplasia
- Adrenal hyperplasia, congenital
- Adrenal hypertension
- Adrenal hypoplasia
- Adrenal hypoplasia congenital, X-linked
- Adrenal incidentaloma
- Adrenal insufficiency
- Adrenal macropolyadenomatosis
- Adrenal medulla neoplasm
- Adrenocortical carcinoma
- Adrenogenital syndrome
- Adrenoleukodystrophy, autosomal, neonatal form
- Adrenoleukodystrophy, X-linked
- Adrenomyodystrophy

=== Adu ===
- Adult attention deficit hyperactivity disorder
- Adult-onset Still's disease
- Adult syndrome
- Advanced sleep phase syndrome

== Ae–Ah ==
- Aerosinusitis
- Afibrinogenemia
- African trypanosomiasis
- Agammaglobulinemia
- Aganglionosis
- Aganglionosis, total intestinal
- Agenesis of the vena cava
- Aggressive fibromatosis
- Aging
- Agnathia
- Agnathia holoprosencephaly situs inversus
- Agnosia, primary visual
- Agoraphobia
- Agraphia
- Agyria
- Agyria pachygyria polymicrogyria
- Agyria-pachygyria type 1
- Ahumada-Del Castillo syndrome

== Ai–Ak ==
- Aicardi–Goutières syndromes
- Aicardi syndrome
- Aichmophobia
- AIDS
- AIDS dementia complex
- AIDS dysmorphic syndrome
- Ainhum
- Akaba–Hayasaka syndrome
- Akesson syndrome
- Aksu–Stckhausen syndrome

== Al ==
- Al Awadi Teebi Farag syndrome
- Al Frayh Facharzt Haque syndrome
- Al Gazali Al Talabani syndrome
- Al Gazali Aziz Salem syndrome
- Al Gazali Donnai Mueller syndrome
- Al Gazali Hirschsprung syndrome
- Al Gazali Khidr Prem Chandran syndrome
- Al Gazali Sabrinathan Nair syndrome

=== Ala–Alc ===
- Alagille–Watson syndrome (AWS)
- Alar nasal cartilages coloboma of telecanthus
- Albers–Schonberg disease
- Albinism
- Albinism deafness syndrome
- Albinism immunodeficiency
- Albinism, minimal pigment type
- Albinism, ocular
- Albinism ocular late onset sensorineural deafness
- Albinism oculocutaneous, Hermansky–Pudlak type
- Albinism, yellow mutant type
- Albinoidism
- Albrecht–Schneider–Belmont syndrome
- Albright–Turner–Morgani syndrome
- Albright's hereditary osteodystrophy
- Albright's syndrome
- Alcohol antenatal infection
- Alcohol dependence
- Alcohol fetopathy
- Alcohol withdrawal syndrome
- Alcoholic hepatitis
- Alcoholic liver cirrhosis

=== Ald–All ===
- Aldolase A deficiency
- Aldred syndrome
- Aleukemic leukemia cutis
- Alexander disease
- Alexia (acquired dyslexia)
- Alien hand syndrome
- Alkaptonuria
- Allain–Babin–Demarquez syndrome
- Allan–Herndon–Dudley syndrome
- Allanson–Pantzar–McLeod syndrome
- Allergic angiitis
- Allergic autoimmune thyroiditis
- Allergic bronchopulmonary aspergillosis
- Allergic encephalomyelitis

=== Alo ===
- Aloi Tomasini Isaia syndrome
- Alopecia
  - Alopecia anosmia deafness hypogonadism syndrome
  - Alopecia areata
  - Alopecia congenita keratosis palmoplantaris
  - Alopecia contractures dwarfism mental retardation
  - Alopecia epilepsy oligophrenia syndrome of Moynahan
  - Alopecia, epilepsy, pyorrhea, mental subnormality
  - Alopecia hypogonadism extrapyramidal disorder
  - Alopecia immunodeficiency
  - Alopecia macular degeneration growth retardation
  - Alopecia mental retardation hypogonadism
  - Alopecia mental retardation syndrome
  - Alopecia totalis
  - Alopecia universalis
  - Alopecia universalis onychodystrophy vitiligo

=== Alp–Alz ===
- Alpers disease
- Alpha 1-antitrypsin deficiency
- Alpha-2 deficient collagen disease
- Alpha-ketoglutarate dehydrogenase deficiency
- Alpha-L-iduronidase deficiency
- Alpha-mannosidosis
- Alpha-sarcoglycanopathy
- Alpha-thalassemia
- Alpha thalassemia abnormal morphogenesis
- Alpha-thalassemia mental retardation syndrome
- Alport syndrome
  - Alport syndrome, dominant type
  - Alport syndrome macrothrombocytopenia
  - Alport syndrome, recessive type
- Alstrom's syndrome
- Alternating hemiplegia
- Alternating hemiplegia of childhood
- Aluminium lung
- Alveolar capillary dysplasia
- Alveolar echinococcosis
- Alveolar soft part sarcoma
- Alveolitis, extrinsic allergic
- Alves Dos Santos Castello syndrome
- Alwadei syndrome
- Alzheimer's disease
  - Alzheimer's disease, early-onset
  - Alzheimer's disease, familial

== Am ==
- Amaurosis
  - Amaurosis congenita of Leber
  - Amaurosis congenita of Leber, type 1
  - Amaurosis congenita of Leber, type 2
  - Amaurosis hypertrichosis
- Amblyopia
- Ambral syndrome
- Ambras syndrome
- Amebiasis
- Amegakaryocytic thrombocytopenia
- Amelia (birth defect)
- Amelia cleft lip palate hydrocephalus iris coloboma
- Amelia facial dysmorphism
- Amelia X linked
- Amelogenesis
- Amelogenesis imperfecta
  - Amelogenesis imperfecta hypomaturation type
  - Amelogenesis imperfecta local hypoplastic form
  - Amelogenesis imperfecta nephrocalcinosis
  - Ameloonychohypohidrotic syndrome
- Amenorrhea
- American trypanosomiasis
- Amnesia
  - Amnesia, anterograde
  - Amnesia, childhood
  - Amnesia, dissociative
  - Amnesia, drug-induced
  - Amnesia, lacunar
  - Amnesia, retrograde
  - Amnesia, source
  - Amnesia, transient global
- Amyotrophic lateral sclerosis

== An ==
=== Ana–Ane ===
- Anaphylaxis
- Anaplasmosis
- Anaplastic thyroid cancer
- Andersen's disease
- Andre syndrome
- Androgen insensitivity syndrome (AIS)
- Anemia
  - Anemia, Diamond–Blackfan
  - Anemia, hypoplastic, congenital
  - Anemia, pernicious
  - Anemia, sideroblastic
  - Anemia sideroblastic spinocerebellar ataxia
- Anencephaly
- Anencephaly spina bifida X linked
- Aneurysm
- Aneurysm, intracranial berry
- Aneurysm of sinus of Valsalva

=== Ang ===
- Angel shaped phalangoep
- Anger irritation syndrome
- Angiofollicular lymph hyperplasia
- Angioimmunoblastic lymphadenopathy with dysproteinemia
- Angiokeratoma mental retardation coarse face
- Angiolipoma
- Angioma
- Angioma hereditary neurocutaneous
- Angiomatosis
- Angiomatosis encephalotrigeminal
- Angiomatosis leptomeningeal capillary - venous
- Angiomatosis systemic cystic seip syndrome
- Angiomyomatous hamartoma
- Angioneurotic edema hereditary due to C1 esterase deficiency
- Angiosarcoma
- Angiosarcoma of the liver
- Angiosarcoma of the scalp
- Angiostrongyliasis
- Angiotensin renin aldosterone hypertension
- Anguillulosis

=== Ani–Ank ===
- Aniridia
- Aniridia absent patella
- Aniridia ataxia renal agenesis psychomotor retardation
- Aniridia cerebellar ataxia mental deficiency
- Aniridia mental retardation syndrome
- Aniridia ptosis mental retardation obesity familial
- Aniridia renal agenesis psychomotor retardation
- Aniridia, sporadic
- Aniridia type 2
- Anisakiasis
- Ankle defects short stature
- Ankyloblepharon ectodermal defects cleft lip palate
- Ankyloblepharon filiforme adnatum cleft palate
- Ankyloblepharon filiforme imperforate anus
- Ankyloglossia heterochromia clasped thumbs
- Ankylosing spondylarthritis
- Ankylosing spondylitis
- Ankylosing vertebral hyperostosis with tylosis
- Ankylosis
- Ankylosis of teeth
- Ankylostomiasis

=== Ann ===
- Annular constricting bands
- Annular pancreas
- Annuloaortic ectasia

=== Ano ===
- Anodontia
- Anomic aphasia
- Anonychia
- Anonychia ectrodactyly
- Anonychia microcephaly
- Anonychia onychodystrophy
- Anonychia-onychodystrophy with brachydactyly type B and ectrodactyly
- Anophthalia
- Anophthalia pulmonary hypoplasia
- Anophthalmia
- Anophthalmia cleft lip palate hypothalamic disorder
- Anophthalmia cleft palate micrognathia
- Anophthalmia esophageal atresia cryptorchidism
- Anophthalmia megalocornea cardiopathy skeletal anomalies
- Anophthalmia microcephaly hypogonadism
- Anophthalmia plus syndrome
- Anophthalmia short stature obesity
- Anophthalmia Waardenburg syndrome
- Anophthalmos
- Anophthalmos, clinical
- Anophthalmos with limb anomalies
- Anorchia
- Anorchidism
- Anorectal anomalies
- Anorectal atresia / Ano-rectal atresia
- Anorexia nervosa

- Anorexia nervosa binge-purge type
- Anorexia nervosa restricting type

- Anorgasmia
- Anosmia
- Anotia
- Anotia facial palsy cardiac defect

=== Ans–Ant ===
- Ansell–Bywaters–Elderking syndrome
- Anterior horn disease
- Anterior pituitary insufficiency, familial
- Anterograde amnesia
- Anthrax
- Anti amnestic syndrome
- Anti-factor VIII autoimmunization
- Antigen-peptide-transporter 2 deficiency
- Anti-HLA hyperimmunization
- Antihypertensive drugs antenatal infection
- Antinolo–Nieto–Borrego syndrome
- Antiphospholipid syndrome
- Anti-plasmin deficiency
- Anti-plasmin deficiency, congenital
- Antisocial personality disorder
- Antisynthetase syndrome
- Antithrombin deficiency, congenital
- Antley–Bixler syndrome
- Anton syndrome

== Ao ==
- Aorta-pulmonary artery fistula
- Aortic aneurysm
- Aortic arch anomaly peculiar facies mental retardation
- Aortic arch interruption
- Aortic arches defect
- Aortic coarctation
- Aortic dissection
- Aortic dissection lentiginosis
- Aortic supravalvular stenosis
- Aortic valve stenosis
- Aortic valves stenosis of the child
- Aortic window

== Ap ==
=== Ape–App ===
- Apert like polydactyly syndrome
- Apert syndrome
- Aphalangia
- Aphalangia hemivertebrae
- Aphalangia syndactyly microcephaly
- Aphthous stomatitis
- Apiphobia
- Aplasia
- Aplasia cutis autosomal recessive
- Aplasia cutis congenita

- Aplasia cutis congenita dominant
- Aplasia cutis congenita epibulbar dermoids
- Aplasia cutis congenita intestinal lymphangiectasia
- Aplasia cutis congenita of limbs recessive
- Aplasia cutis congenita recessive

- Aplasia cutis-myopia
- Aplasia/hypoplasia of pelvis, femur, fibula, and ulna with abnormal digits and nails
- Aplastic anemia
- Aplastic crisis
- Apo A-I deficiency
- Apolipoprotein C-II deficiency
- Apparent mineralocorticoid excess
- Appelt–Gerken–Lenz syndrome
- Appendicitis

=== Apr–Apu ===
- Apraxia
- Apraxia, Ideomotor
- Apraxia manual
- Apraxia, ocular motor, Cogan type
- Apudoma

== Aq ==
- Aqueductal stenosis
- Aqueductal stenosis, X-linked

== Ar ==
=== Ara–Aro ===
- Arachindonic acid, absence of
- Arachnodactyly

- Arachnodactyly ataxia cataract aminoaciduria mental retardation
- Arachnodactyly mental retardation dysmorphism

- Arachnoid cysts
- Arachnoiditis
- Arakawa's syndrome II
- Arbovirosis
- Arc syndrome
- AREDYLD syndrome
- Argentine hemorrhagic fever
- Arginase deficiency
- Arginemia
- Argininosuccinate synthetase deficiency
- Argininosuccinic aciduria
- Argyria
- Arhinia
- Arhinia choanal atresia microphthalmia
- Arnold–Stickler–Bourne syndrome
- Arnold–Chiari malformation
- Aromatase deficiency
- Aromatase excess syndrome
- Aromatic amino acid decarboxylase deficiency

=== Arr–Ars ===
- Arrhinia
- Arrhythmogenic right ventricular dysplasia
- Arroyo–Garcia–Cimadevilla syndrome
- Arrythmogenic right ventricular dysplasia, familial
- Arsenic poisoning

=== Art ===
==== Arte ====
- Arterial calcification of infancy
- Arterial dysplasia
- Arterial tortuosity
- Arteriovenous malformation
- Arteritis

==== Arth ====
- Arthritis
- Arthritis, juvenile
- Arthritis short stature deafness
- Arthrogryposis

- Arthrogryposis due to muscular dystrophy
- Arthrogryposis ectodermal dysplasia other anomalies
- Arthrogryposis epileptic seizures migrational brain disorder
- Arthrogryposis IUGR thoracic dystrophy
- Arthrogryposis like disorder
- Arthrogryposis like hand anomaly sensorineural
- Arthrogryposis multiplex congenita CNS calcification
- Arthrogryposis multiplex congenita distal
- Arthrogryposis multiplex congenita neurogenic type
- Arthrogryposis multiplex congenita pulmonary hypoplasia
- Arthrogryposis multiplex congenita whistling face
- Arthrogryposis multiplex congenita, distal type 1
- Arthrogryposis multiplex congenita, distal type 2
- Arthrogryposis multiplex congenita, distal, x-linked
- Arthrogryposis multiplex congenita
- Arthrogryposis ophthalmoplegia retinopathy
- Arthrogryposis renal dysfunction cholestasis syndrome
- Arthrogryposis spinal muscular atrophy

=== Ary ===
- Arylsulfatase A deficiency

== As ==
- Asbestosis
- Ascariasis
- Ascher's syndrome
- Aseptic meningitis
- Asherman's syndrome
- Ashman phenomenon
- Aspartylglycosaminuria
- Aspergillosis
- Asphyxia neonatorum
- Aspiration pneumonia
- Asplenia
- Astasia-abasia
- Astasis
- Asthenia
- Asthma
- Astigmatism
- Astrocytoma
- Astrovirus infection
- Asymmetric septal hypertrophy

== At ==
- Ataxia–telangiectasia
- Atelectasis
- Atelosteogenesis
  - Type I
  - Type II
  - Type III
- Athabaskan brainstem dysgenesis syndrome
- Atherosclerosis
- Athlete's foot
- Atopic dermatitis
- Atopic conjunctivitis
- Atopic keratoconjunctivitis
- Atrial myxoma
- Atrial septal defect
- Atrioventricular septal defect
- Atrophodermas
  - Atrophoderma of Moulin
  - Atrophoderma of Pasini and Pierini
  - Atrophoderma vermiculatum
- ATR-X
- ATR-16 syndrome
- Attention deficit hyperactivity disorder
- Attenuated FAP
- Atypical lipodystrophy

== Au–Az ==
- Auditory processing disorders
- Ausems Wittebol-Post Hennekam syndrome (Cleft lip-retinopathy syndrome)
- Autism spectrum disorder
- Autoimmune hemolytic anemia
- Autoimmune hepatitis
- Autoimmune peripheral neuropathy
- Autoimmune polyendocrinopathy
- Autonomic dysfunction
- Autosomal dominant leukodystrophy with autonomic disease
- Autosomal dominant porencephaly type I
- Autosomal recessive axonal neuropathy with neuromyotonia
- Autosomal recessive isolated ectopia lentis
- Avian influenza (Bird flu)
- Avoidant personality disorder
- Axial mesodermal dysplasia complex
- Axial spondyloarthritis
- Axial osteosclerosis
- Ayazi syndrome (Choroideremia-deafness-obesity syndrome)
