= Bosma arhinia microphthalmia syndrome =

Genetic disorder

- Other names: Hyposmia-nasal and ocular hypoplasia-hypogonadotropic hypogonadism syndrome; Bosma syndrome
- Specialty: Medical genetics
- Symptoms: Arrhinia; Microphthalmia; Hypogonadotropic hypogonadism
- Causes: Mutations in SMCHD1 gene

Bosma arhinia microphthalmia syndrome (BAMS) is a rare genetic disorder characterized by nasal and ocular abnormalities, often accompanied by endocrine dysfunction.

== Presentation ==
The typical indicator of BAMS is arrhinia, characterized by the complete absence of an external nose or, in some cases, a severely underdeveloped (hypoplastic) nose. This is often accompanied by the absence of olfactory bulb, leading to impaired smell (hyposmia or anosmia) and taste (ageusia). Patients typically exhibit microphthalmia (abnormally small eyeballs) or anophthalmia (absence of eyeballs), resulting in severe vision impairment or blindness. Additional eye abnormalities may include colobomas, cataracts, and nasolacrimal duct obstruction. Common craniofacial abnormalities include a high-arched or cleft palate, absence of paranasal sinuses, choanal atresia, and a hypoplastic maxilla. Some patients may also present with external ear abnormalities. BAMS is associated with hypogonadotropic hypogonadism, leading to absent or delayed puberty and sexual development. This can manifest as underdeveloped genitals in males and lack of breast development or menstruation in females. Despite the severe craniofacial abnormalities, patients with BAMS typically have normal cognition and intellectual abilities.

== Genetics ==
Bosma arhinia microphthalmia syndrome is primarily caused by de novo mutations in the N-terminal GHKL-type ATPase domain of the SMCHD1 gene, which encodes a protein that regulates chromatin structure and gene silencing during embryogenesis and is important for craniofacial development. The mutations are thought to produce a gain-of-function effect that disrupts normal nasal and ocular development. BAMS follows an autosomal dominant inheritance pattern, so a single mutated copy of SMCHD1 can cause the disorder.

== Diagnosis ==
The condition is typically diagnosed at birth from physical examination findings such as the absence of the nose and small or absent eyes. However, genetic testing is needed to confirm the diagnosis by using techniques such as next-generation sequencing to identify mutations in the SMCHD1 gene. Genetic testing is required to distinguish BAMS from other syndromes that present with similar craniofacial abnormalities, such as CHARGE syndrome or Treacher Collins syndrome.

== Treatment ==
Treatment is symptomatic and individualised, and usually requires a team of pediatricians, endocrinologists, ophthalmologists, and craniofacial surgeons. Nasal reconstruction and ocular prosthesis have been used to improve breathing and the cosmetic appearance of the face.

Individuals with BAMS commonly experience hypogonadotropic hypogonadism due to disrupted gonadotropin-releasing hormone (GnRH) neurons. Hormone therapy can help manage this condition by supplementing deficient hormones. Genetic counseling and psychological support are often recommended for patients and their families.
