= Xia–Gibbs syndrome =

- Other names: AHDC1-related intellectual disability-obstructive sleep apnea-mild dysmorphism syndrome

Xia–Gibbs syndrome is genetic disorder caused by a heterozygous mutation in the AHDC1 gene (AT hook, DNA binding motif, containing 1) on chromosome 1p36 .

Around 300 cases worldwide to this date (September 23, 2022) have been diagnosed.

== Signs and symptoms ==
Xia–Gibbs syndrome is associated with symptoms including global developmental delay, hypotonia, obstructive sleep apnea, seizures, retrocerebellar cyst, delayed myelination, thinned corpus callosum, cutis aplasia, cortical visual impairment, micrognathia and mild dysmorphic features.

== Diagnosis ==
Diagnosis requires diagnosis by whole-exome sequencing done by a genetic specialist.

== History ==
In 2014, a human genetic disorder (Xia-Gibbs syndrome) caused by de novo mutations in AHDC1 was discovered through whole-exome sequencing by Xia, et al. Four patients were identified in the paper which recorded the initial discovery and their clinical features were reported, including global developmental delay, hypotonia, obstructive sleep apnea, intellectual disability and seizures. The publication of the paper and discovery of the new condition was reported in the media including in Science Daily and in Baylor College of Medicine News. Subsequent research has identified and reported the clinical features of an additional seven patients and there are now known to be twenty confirmed cases.
