= Membranous aplasia cutis =

- Specialty: Dermatology

Membranous aplasia cutis is a cutaneous condition, a type of aplasia cutis congenita, which can be seen along the embryonic fusion lines of the face.

== See also ==
- List of cutaneous conditions
