= Anonychia-onychodystrophy with brachydactyly type B and ectrodactyly =

- Specialty: Medical genetics

Anonychia-onychodystrophy with brachydactyly type B and ectrodactyly is a very rare autosomal dominant disorder which is characterized by onychodystrophy, anonychia, fifth finger brachydactyly, thumb digitalization, and missing to underdeveloped distal phalanges of the fingers. It has been described in multiple members of a 5-generation English family.

== Signs and symptoms ==
- Onychodystrophy
- Anonychia
- Fifth finger brachydactyly (Brachydactyly type A3)
- Thumb digitalization
- Hypo/aplasia of the digits' distal phalanges.

== Medical literature ==
It was first described in a 5-generation family, they had the symptoms mentioned above and metatacarpal and metatarsal underdevelopment. At least two individuals had total absence of the metacarpal bones.
