= Ascher's syndrome =

- Other names: Blepharochalasis-double lip syndrome, Laffer–Ascher syndrome, Ascher syndrome.
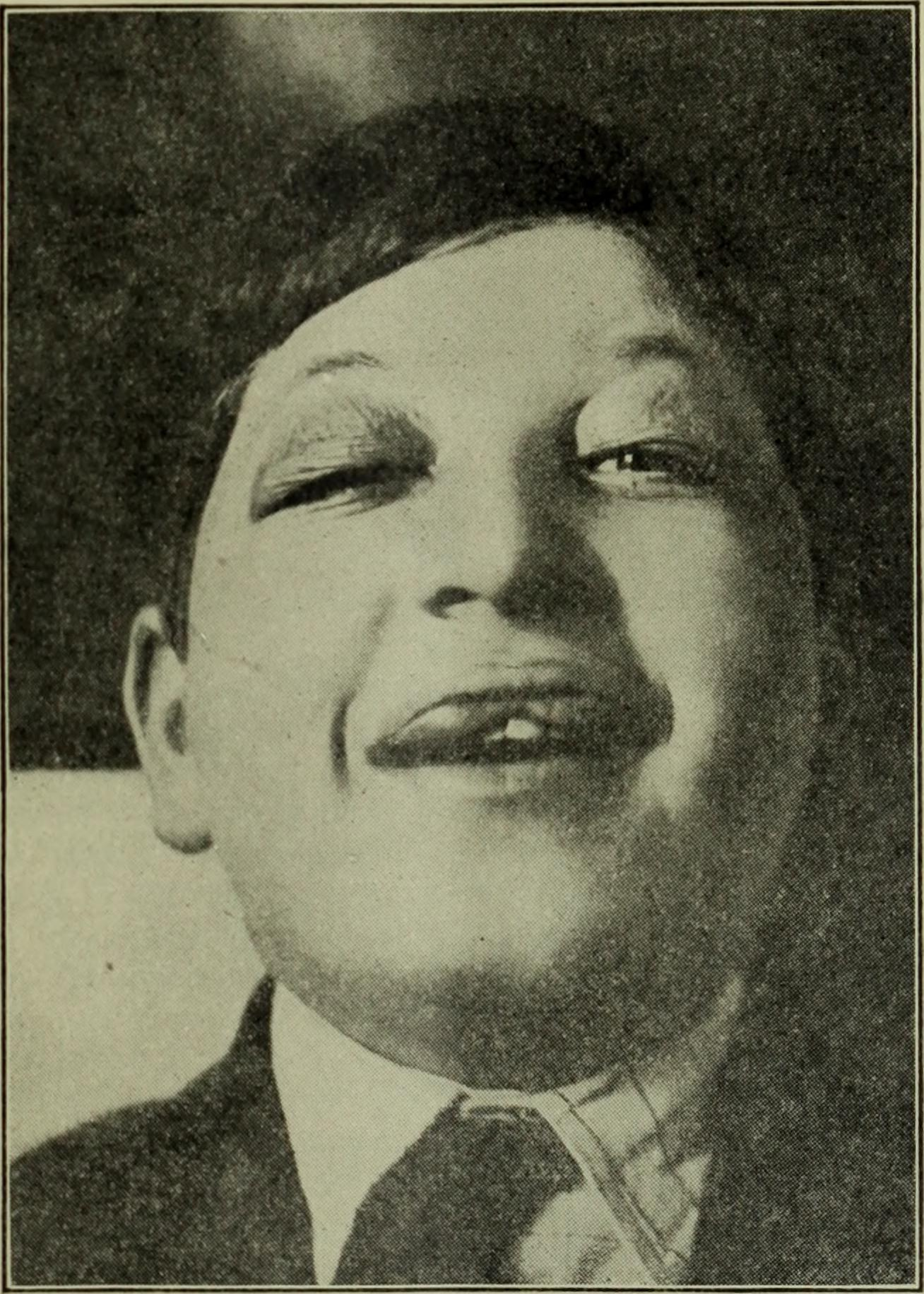
- Blepharochalasis involving also the upper lip in a boy aged 12
- Specialty: Medical genetics.
- Symptoms: Blepharochalasis, double upper lip appearance, and nontoxic goiter
- Causes: Genetics, trauma and hormonal dysfunction.
- Differential diagnosis: Cardiac or renal diseases, and Ehlers-Danlos syndrome type VII.
- Treatment: Surgery.

Ascher's syndrome is a rare clinical entity distinguished by blepharochalasis, double upper lip appearance, and nontoxic goiter. Nontoxic goiter is a rare finding, occurring in only 10–50% of cases. It may appear several years following the onset of blepharochalasis, so it is not considered necessary for the diagnosis of Ascher's syndrome. The condition was initially identified by Ascher, an ophthalmologist from Prague, in 1920. The cause of this syndrome is still unknown, though trauma and hormonal dysfunction have been suggested as possible causes.

== Signs and symptoms ==
Ascher's syndrome is clinically distinguished by the triad of double upper lip, blepharochalasis, and nontoxic goiter, which comprise the syndrome's complete form. Nontoxic goiter, on the other hand, is present in only 10% to 50% of cases, and its presence is not required for diagnosis.

Only 10% of young people with blepharochalasis have double lips. It is distinguished by the following three stages:

1. Painless swelling of the eyelids that occurs intermittently
2. Ptosis due to levator aponeurosis dehiscence or lax and thin skin falling over the eyelid margin
3. Blepharochalasis with medial fat pad atrophy, orbital fat prolapse, and lacrimal gland prolapse.

== Causes ==
The cause of the syndrome is still unknown, though trauma and hormonal dysfunction have been suggested as possible causes. Some authors mention autosomal dominant inheritance, allergies, and defects in elastic fibers that appear fragmented or reduced in size.

The acquired type is usually caused by local trauma, whereas the congenital type is caused by a developmental defect and is often associated with bifid uvula, palatine fissure, glandular cheilitis, and hemangioma.

== Diagnosis ==
Ascher's syndrome is diagnosed clinically. Differential diagnoses may include cardiac or renal diseases, and some syndromes, such as Ehlers–Danlos syndrome type VII, may occur in conjunction with other syndromes. Blepharochalasis and double lip can also occur as isolated conditions.

== Treatment ==
Ascher's syndrome has no specific pharmaceutical treatment. When the condition interferes with vision, speech, or chewing cosmetic surgery is usually the treatment of choice. Surgical treatment to remove excess tissue from the eyelids or lips is usually advised. Although recurrence is rare, good functional and cosmetic results are usually obtained.

== History ==
Ascher's syndrome was first described in 1920 by Ascher, a Prague ophthalmologist. Laffer described the association of blepharochalasis and double lip in 1909. This is why some authors continue to refer to it as Laffer–Ascher syndrome.

== See also ==
- Blepharochalasis
