= Aplasia cutis congenita-intestinal lymphangiectasia syndrome =

- Specialty: Medical genetics
- Symptoms: A combination of aplasia cutis congenita and lymphangiectasia
- Complications: Death
- Usual onset: Birth
- Prevention: none
- Prognosis: Bad
- Frequency: very rare, only two cases have been described in medical literature
- Deaths: -

Aplasia cutis congenita-intestinal lymphangiectasia syndrome is a very rare genetic disorder which is characterized by aplasia cutis congenita, intestinal lymphangiectasia-induced generalized edema, hypoproteinemia, and lymphopenia. It has been described in two Ashkenazi Jewish brothers.
