= SMCHD1 =

Protein-coding gene in the species Homo sapiens

Identifiers
- Aliases: SMCHD1, structural maintenance of chromosomes flexible hinge domain containing 1, BAMS, FSHD2
- External IDs: OMIM: 614982; MGI: 1921605; GeneCards: SMCHD1

Gene location (Human)
Chr.	Chromosome 18 (human)
Band	18p11.32	Start	2,655,726 bp
Band	18p11.32	End	2,805,017 bp

Gene location (Mouse)
Chr.	Chromosome 17 (mouse)
Band	17|17 E1.3	Start	71,651,484 bp
Band	17|17 E1.3	End	71,782,338 bp
RNA expression pattern
Bgee	Human / Mouse (ortholog); Top expressed in: Achilles tendon; epithelium of colon; blood; bone marrow cell; monocyte; superficial temporal artery; right lung; granulocyte; jejunal mucosa; spleen / Top expressed in: hand; genital tubercle; ventricular zone; tail of embryo; cumulus cell; vas deferens; condyle; epiblast; spleen; Gonadal ridge; More reference expression data
BioGPS	n/a
Gene ontology
Molecular function	ATP binding; ATPase activity; DNA binding; protein binding; hydrolase activity; protein homodimerization activity
Cellular component	chromosome; Barr body; site of double-strand break
Biological process	dosage compensation by inactivation of X chromosome; chromosome organization; nose development; double-strand break repair; DNA repair; chromatin organization; cellular response to DNA damage stimulus; positive regulation of DNA repair; inactivation of X chromosome by heterochromatin assembly; negative regulation of double-strand break repair via homologous recombination; positive regulation of double-strand break repair via nonhomologous end joining
Sources:Amigo / QuickGO
Orthologs
Databases	NCBI: entry; OMA: entry
Species	Human	Mouse
Entrez	23347	74355
Ensembl	ENSG00000101596	ENSMUSG00000024054
UniProt	A6NHR9	Q6P5D8
RefSeq (mRNA)	NM_015295	NM_028887
RefSeq (protein)	NP_056110	NP_083163
Location (UCSC)	Chr 18: 2.66 – 2.81 Mb	Chr 17: 71.65 – 71.78 Mb
PubMed search
- Wikidata
View/Edit Human	View/Edit Mouse

Structural Maintenance of Chromosomes flexible Hinge Domain Containing 1 (SMCHD1) is a protein that in humans is encoded by the SMCHD1 gene. Mutations in SMCHD1 are causative for development of facioscapulohumeral muscular dystrophy type 2 (FSHD2) and Bosma arhinia microphthalmia syndrome (BAMS).

Without maternal SMCHD1 in the egg cell, children bear with altered skeletal structures.
