= Abdominal chemodectomas with cutaneous angiolipomas =

- Abdominal chemodectomas with cutaneous angiolipomas is inherited in an autosomal dominant fashion.
- Specialty: Dermatology

Abdominal chemodectomas with cutaneous angiolipomas is a skin disease that presents with angiolipomas in the skin and chemodectomas. It is inherited in an autosomal dominant manner.
