= Adams–Nance syndrome =

- Other names: Persistent Tachycardia, Paroxysmal Hypertension, and Seizures
- This condition is inherited in an autosomal recessive manner.
- Specialty: Cardiology, Endocrinology
- Symptoms: Tachycardia, paroxysmal hypertension, seizures,microphthalmos, visual loss, cataracts, and kidney stones.
- Complications: Paroxysmal supraventricular tachycardia.
- Causes: Hyperglycinuria.
- Named after: Crawford W Adams; Walter E Nance

Adams–Nance syndrome is a medical condition consisting of persistent tachycardia, paroxysmal hypertension and seizures. It is associated with hyperglycinuria, dominantly inherited microphthalmia and cataracts. It is thought to be caused by a disturbance in glycine metabolism.
