= Cutis verticis gyrata =

Medical condition

- Other names: CVG
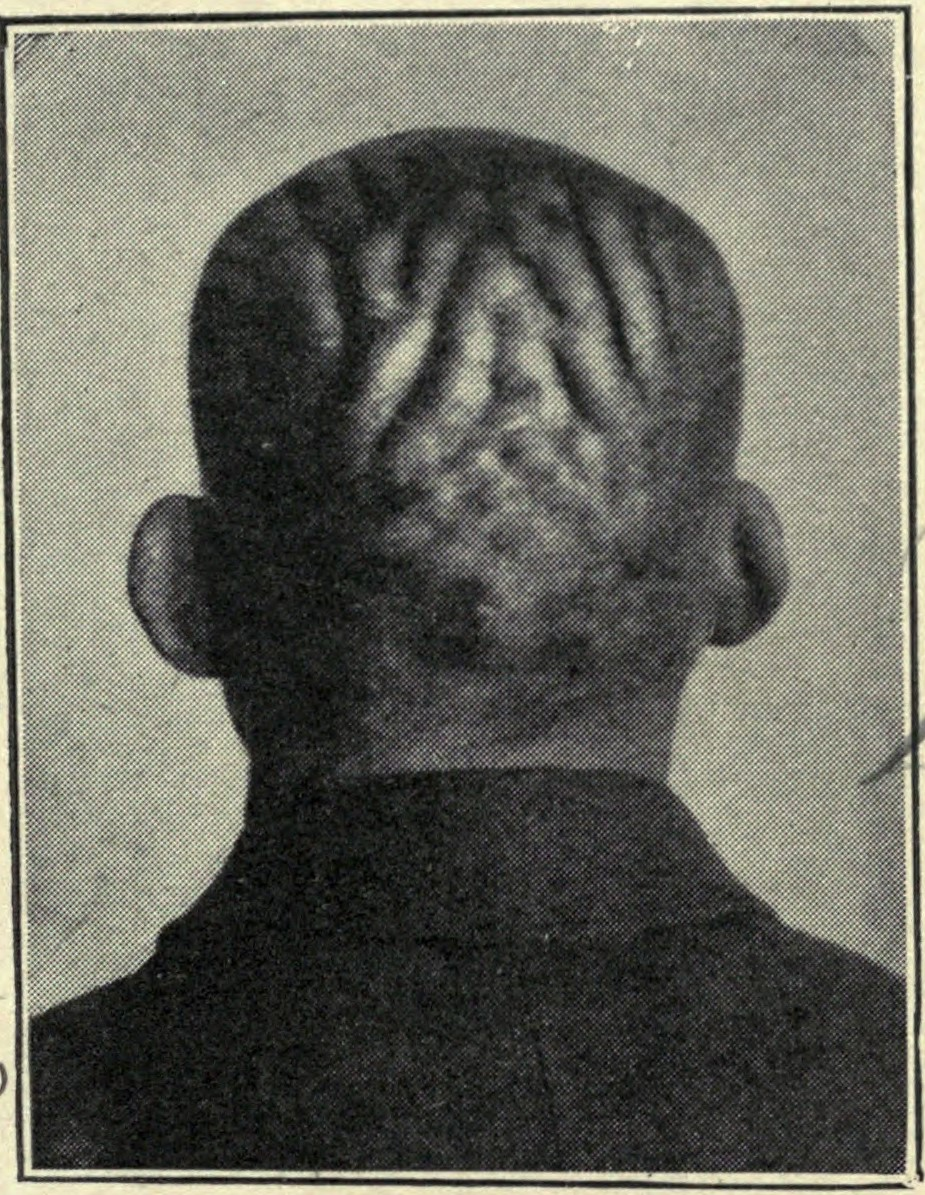
- Cutis verticis gyrata

Cutis verticis gyrata is a medical condition usually associated with thickening of the scalp. The condition is identified by excessive thickening of the soft tissues of the scalp and characterized by ridges and furrows, which give the scalp a cerebriform appearance. Clinically, the ridges are hard and cannot be flattened on applying pressure. Patients show visible folds, ridges or creases on the surface of the top of the scalp. The number of folds can vary from two to roughly ten and they are typically soft and spongy. The condition typically affects the central and rear regions of the scalp, but sometimes can involve the entire scalp.

Hair loss can occur over time where the scalp thickens, though hair within any furrows remains normal. Thus far, due to the (apparent) rarity of the condition, limited research exists, and causes are as yet undetermined. What is known is that the condition is not exclusively congenital.

The condition was first reported by French dermatologist Jean-Louis-Marc Alibert in 1837, who called it cutis sulcata. A clinical description of the condition was provided by Robert in 1843, and it was named by German physician Paul Gerson Unna in 1907. It has also been called Robert-Unna syndrome, bulldog scalp, corrugated skin, cutis verticis plicata, and pachydermia verticis gyrata.

== Cause ==
At this time, causes are unknown, but it is believed to not be congenital.

=== Conditions and syndromes ===
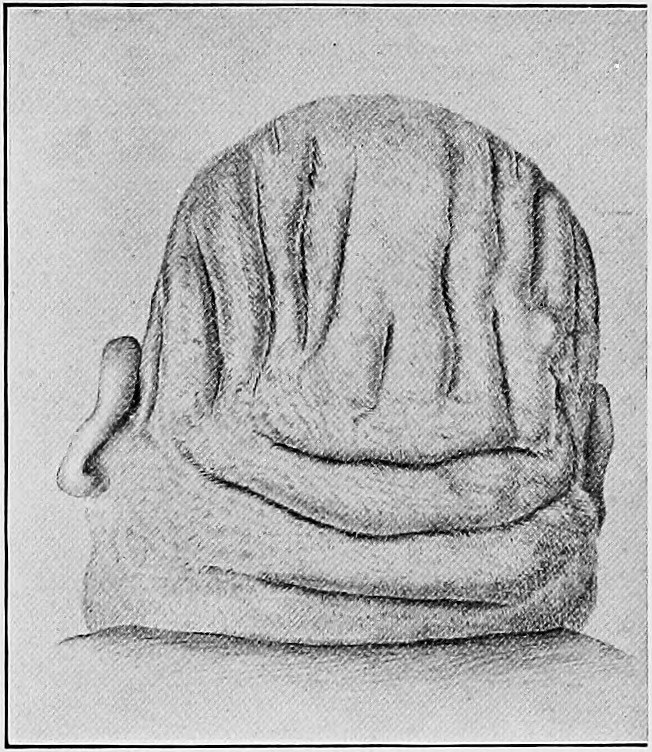

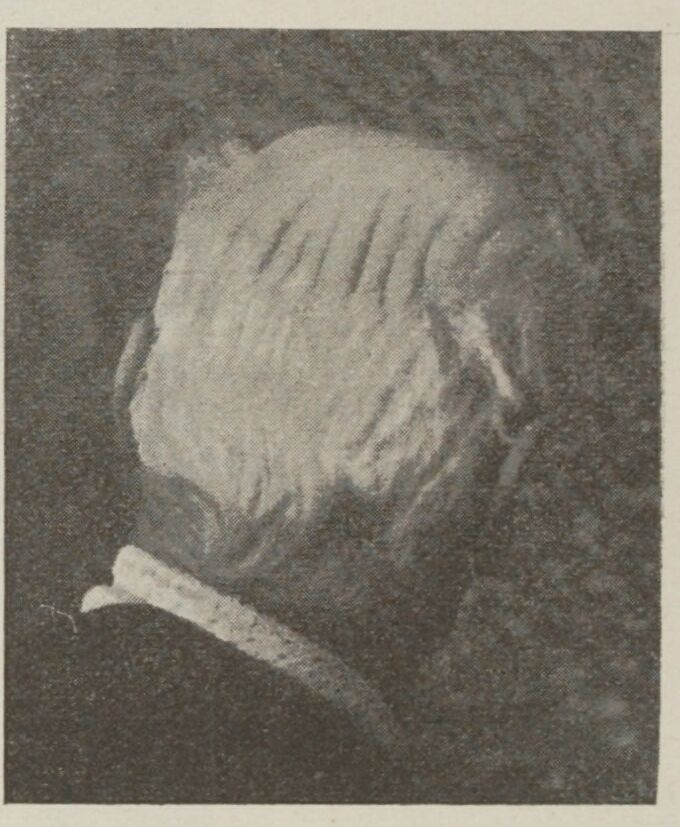
CVG in two cases of turricephaly

CVG is a feature of several conditions:

- Acromegaloid phenotype with cutis verticis gyrata and corneal leukoma
- Beare-Stevenson cutis gyrata syndrome
- Cutis verticis gyrata and intellectual disability
- Cutis verticis gyrata, thyroid aplasia, and intellectual disability
- Hypertrophic osteoarthropathy, primary, autosomal dominant
- NDE1-related microhydranencephaly
- Necrotizing encephalomyelopathy, subacute, of Leigh, adult

== Diagnosis ==
The diagnosis of CVG is primarily clinical, based on the physical appearance of the scalp. Dermatological examination reveals the presence of thickened skin folds and furrows that are most commonly found on the vertex and occipital regions of the scalp. In some cases, additional tests may be conducted to rule out underlying conditions, especially for secondary CVG, including hormonal assays, imaging studies, or biopsy to assess the scalp's histological features.

=== Classifications ===
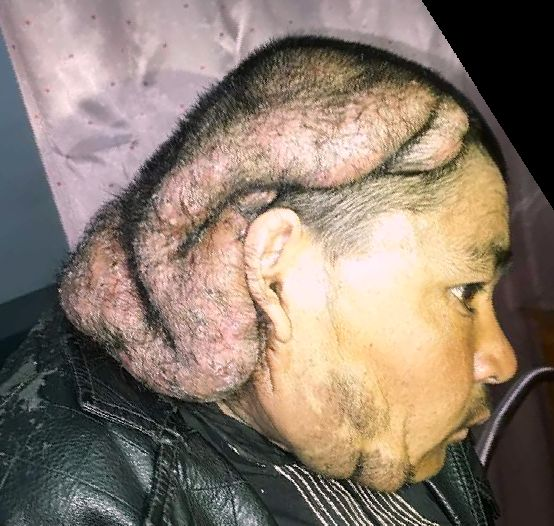
An extreme case of cutis verticis gyrata

CVG is classified according to the presence, or lack of underlying cause. Studies suggest that CVG often occurs in individuals in a secondary form to other ailments. However, the condition can also be present on its own. CVG can be classified into two forms: 'primary' (essential and non-essential) and 'secondary'.

The classifications are:

- Primary essential
- Primary non-essential
- Secondary

Primary essential CVG is where the cause of the condition is unknown. It has no other associated abnormalities. This occurs mainly in men, with a male:female ratio of between 5:1 and 6:1, and develops during or soon after puberty. Because of the slow progression of the condition, which usually occurs without symptom, it often passes unnoticed in the early stage.

Primary non-essential CVG can be associated with neuropsychiatric disorders including cerebral palsy, epilepsy, seizures, and ophthalmologic abnormalities, most commonly cataracts.

Secondary CVG occurs as a consequence of a number of diseases or drugs that produce changes in scalp structure. These include: acromegaly (excessive growth hormone levels due to pituitary gland tumours), and theoretically, the use of growth hormone itself or the use of drugs that mimic the effect of growth hormone (such as GHRP-6 and CJC-1295). It may also arise in association with melanocytic naevi (moles), birthmarks (including connective tissue naevi, fibromas and naevus lipomatosus), and inflammatory processes (e.g. eczema, psoriasis, Darier disease, folliculitis, impetigo, atopic dermatitis, acne).

== Treatment ==
Options for medical treatment for this condition have been limited to plastic surgery with excision of the folds by means of scalp reduction/surgical resection. Scalp subcision has also been suggested as a treatment. Additional suggestions also include injections of a dermal filler (e.g. (poly-L-lactic acid)).

Two published medical journals appear to show Hyaluronidase injections (Hyaluronidase is an enzyme used to dissolve hyaluronic acid which is a component of our skin that contributes to its thickness) as a possible treatment.

== See also ==
- Skin lesion
- List of cutaneous conditions
- External Support Group
