= R-spondin 4 =

Protein-coding gene in the species Homo sapiens

RSPO4

Identifiers
- Aliases: RSPO4, C20orf182, CRISTIN4, R-spondin 4
- External IDs: OMIM: 610573; MGI: 1924467; GeneCards: RSPO4

Gene location (Human)
Chr.	Chromosome 20 (human)
Band	20p13	Start	958,452 bp
Band	20p13	End	1,002,311 bp

Gene location (Mouse)
Chr.	Chromosome 2 (mouse)
Band	2|2 G3	Start	151,684,847 bp
Band	2|2 G3	End	151,716,588 bp
RNA expression pattern
Bgee	Human / Mouse (ortholog); Top expressed in: upper lobe of left lung; hypothalamus; putamen; caudate nucleus; nucleus accumbens; right uterine tube; right lung; substantia nigra; right lobe of thyroid gland; amygdala / Top expressed in: muscle layer of seminal vesicle; muscle layer of urethra; ejaculatory duct; vagina; molar; lamina propria of prostatic urethra; prostatic epithelium; muscle layer of ejaculatory duct; anterior lobe of prostate; lamina propria of vagina; More reference expression data
BioGPS	n/a
Gene ontology
Molecular function	heparin binding; frizzled binding
Cellular component	extracellular region; extracellular space
Biological process	Wnt signaling pathway; positive regulation of Wnt signaling pathway; response to stimulus; nail development; positive regulation of canonical Wnt signaling pathway
Sources:Amigo / QuickGO
Orthologs
Databases	NCBI: entry; OMA: entry
Species	Human	Mouse
Entrez	343637	228770
Ensembl	ENSG00000101282	ENSMUSG00000032852
UniProt	Q2I0M5	Q8BJ73
RefSeq (mRNA)	NM_001029871; NM_001040007	NM_001040689
RefSeq (protein)	NP_001025042; NP_001035096	NP_001035779
Location (UCSC)	Chr 20: 0.96 – 1 Mb	Chr 2: 151.68 – 151.72 Mb
PubMed search
- Wikidata
View/Edit Human	View/Edit Mouse

R-spondin 4 is a protein in humans that is encoded by the RSPO4 gene, located on chromosome 20. This gene encodes a member of the R-spondin family of proteins that share a common domain organization consisting of a signal peptide, cysteine-rich/furin-like domain, thrombospondin domain and a C-terminal basic region. The encoded protein may be involved in activation of Wnt/beta-catenin signaling pathways. Mutations in this gene are associated with anonychia. Alternate splicing results in multiple transcript variants.[provided by RefSeq, Sep 2009].
