= AHDC1 =

Protein-coding gene in humans

Identifiers
- Aliases: AHDC1, MRD25, AT-hook DNA binding motif containing 1, XIGIS
- External IDs: OMIM: 615790; MGI: 2444218; HomoloGene: 17144; GeneCards: AHDC1; OMA:AHDC1 - orthologs

Gene location (Human)
Chr.	Chromosome 1 (human)
Band	1p36.11-p35.3	Start	27,534,035 bp
Band	1p36.11-p35.3	End	27,604,431 bp

Gene location (Mouse)
Chr.	Chromosome 4 (mouse)
Band	4|4 D2.3	Start	132,738,571 bp
Band	4|4 D2.3	End	132,805,421 bp
RNA expression pattern
Bgee	Human / Mouse (ortholog); Top expressed in: paraflocculus of cerebellum; Brodmann area 10; frontal pole; sural nerve; middle frontal gyrus; gastric mucosa; popliteal artery; tibial arteries; muscle of thigh; right hemisphere of cerebellum / Top expressed in: zygote; secondary oocyte; primary visual cortex; spermatocyte; neural layer of retina; superior frontal gyrus; yolk sac; epiblast; primary oocyte; seminiferous tubule; More reference expression data
BioGPS	n/a
Orthologs
Species	Human	Mouse
Entrez	27245	230793
Ensembl	ENSG00000126705	ENSMUSG00000037692
UniProt	Q5TGY3	Q6PAL7
RefSeq (mRNA)	NM_001029882; NM_001371928	NM_146155
RefSeq (protein)	NP_001025053; NP_001358857	NP_666267; NP_001391059; NP_001391060; NP_001391061; NP_001391062
Location (UCSC)	Chr 1: 27.53 – 27.6 Mb	Chr 4: 132.74 – 132.81 Mb
PubMed search
- Wikidata
View/Edit Human	View/Edit Mouse

Transcription factor Gibbin is a protein that in humans is encoded by the AHDC1 (AT-hook DNA binding motif containing 1) gene. Mutation in the gene cause Xia–Gibbs syndrome, whose symptoms include developmental delay, global hypotonia, obstructive sleep apnoea and seizures.

== Clinical significance ==
In 2014, a human genetic disorder (Xia-Gibbs Syndrome) caused by de novo mutations in AHDC1 was discovered through whole-exome sequencing. Four patients were identified in the paper which recorded the initial discovery and their clinical features were reported, including global developmental delay, hypotonia, obstructive sleep apnea, intellectual disability and seizures. The publication of the paper and discovery of the new condition was reported in the media including in Science Daily and in Baylor College of Medicine News. Subsequent research has identified and reported the clinical features of an additional seven patients and there are now known to be twenty confirmed cases.
