= David Weyhe Smith =

American physician

- Born: September 24, 1926; Oakland, California
- Died: January 23, 1981 (aged 54); Seattle, Washington
- Occupations: pediatrician, dysmorphologist
- Known for: describing fetal alcohol syndrome
- Notable work: Recognizable Patterns of Human Malformation

David Weyhe Smith (September 24, 1926 – January 23, 1981) was an American pediatrician and dysmorphologist, best known for his pioneering book Recognizable Patterns of Human Malformation and for describing fetal alcohol syndrome.

== Early life and education ==
David Weyhe Smith was born in Oakland, California. He gained his medical degree from Johns Hopkins School of Medicine and undertook postdoctoral studies during 1950-51 and 1953-56 in the Department of Pediatrics. He worked with Lawson Wilkins in the field of pediatric endocrinology.

== Career ==
In 1958, he began working at the University of Wisconsin School of Medicine and Public Health, and became a professor of pediatrics there. From 1966 until the end of his career he was at the University of Washington, Seattle. His work in dysmorphology was recognized worldwide.

In 1973, Smith and Kenneth Lyons Jones identified a pattern of "craniofacial, limb, and cardiovascular defects associated with prenatal onset growth deficiency and developmental delay" in eight unrelated children of three ethnic groups, all born to mothers who were alcoholics. They called it the fetal alcohol syndrome.

Smith died of cancer in Seattle at the age of 54.

== Works ==
His book Recognizable Patterns of Human Malformation is considered a key work in the field. He also published five other monographs as well as nearly 200 papers.

== Legacy ==
The condition known as Aase–Smith syndrome is named for Smith and colleague Jon Morton Aase. Smith also co-discovered Smith–Lemli–Opitz syndrome, Marshall–Smith syndrome, Ruvalcaba-Myhre-Smith syndrome and Smith-Theiler-Schachenmann cerebro-costo-mandibular syndrome.
