= Beare–Stevenson cutis gyrata syndrome =

Autosomal dominant genetic disorder

- Other names: Cutis gyrata-acanthosis nigricans-craniosynostosis syndrome
- Diagnostic method: Clinical features and genetic testing.

Beare–Stevenson cutis gyrata syndrome is a rare genetic disorder characterized by craniosynostosis (premature fusion of certain bones of the skull, sometimes resulting in a characteristic 'cloverleaf skull'; further growth of the skull is prevented, and therefore the shape of the head and face is abnormal) and a specific skin abnormality, called cutis gyrata, characterized by a furrowed and wrinkled appearance (particularly in the face and on the palms and soles of the feet); thick, dark, velvety areas of skin (acanthosis nigricans) are sometimes found on the hands and feet and in the groin.

== Presentation ==
Signs and symptoms of Beare–Stevenson cutis gyrata syndrome can include a blockage of the nasal passages (choanal atresia), overgrowth of the umbilical stump, and abnormalities of the genitalia and anus. The medical complications associated with this condition are often severe and may well be life-threatening in infancy or early childhood.

== Genetics ==
Several mutations in the FGFR2 gene (a gene coding for a protein called fibroblast growth factor receptor 2, which is involved in important signaling pathways) are known to cause Beare–Stevenson cutis gyrata syndrome; however, not all patients with the condition have a mutation in their FGFR2 gene. Any alternative underlying causes are currently unidentified. The syndrome follows an autosomal dominant pattern, meaning that if one of the two available genes carries a mutation the syndrome will result. Currently, no familial histories are known (in other words, there are no reports of cases in which a parent carrying a mutation in their FGFR2 gene then propagated said mutation to his or her child).

== Diagnosis ==
Identification of the p.Pro250Arg pathogenic variant in FGFR3; the diagnosis of FGFR2-related isolated coronal synostosis is based on the identification of a FGFR2 pathogenic variant. The diagnosis of the other six FGFR-related craniosynostosis syndromes is based on clinical findings; molecular genetic testing of FGFR1, FGFR2, and FGFR3 may be helpful in establishing the specific diagnosis in questionable cases.

== Incidence ==
Beare–Stevenson cutis gyrata syndrome is so rare that a reliable incidence cannot be established as of yet; fewer than 25 patients with the condition have been reported.

== See also ==
- Cutis verticis gyrata
- List of cutaneous conditions
