= Brachymetacarpia =

Medical condition

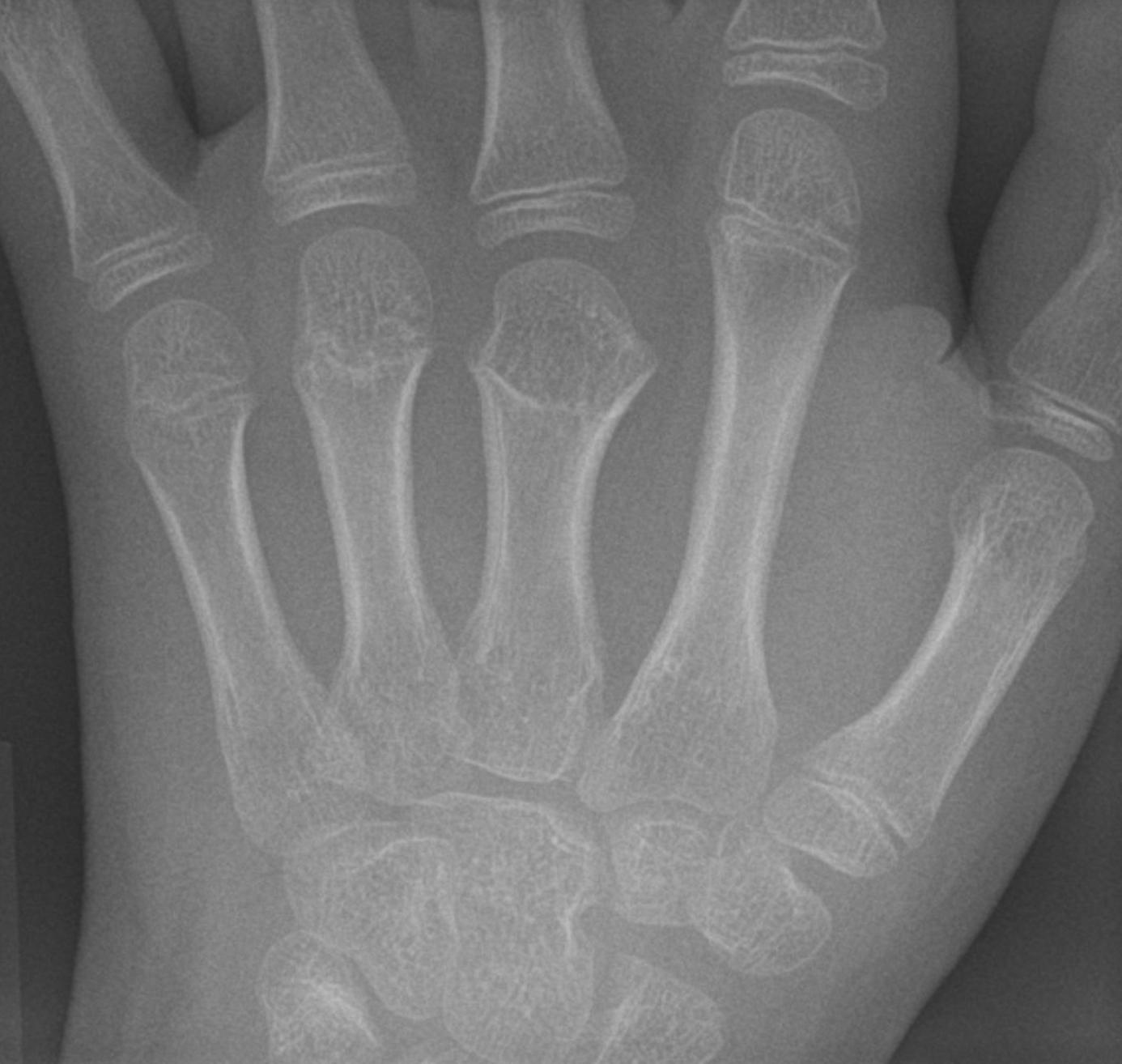
Brachymetacarpia of the third metacarpal (middle finger)

Brachymetacarpia or brachymetacarpalia is a medical condition in which the metacarpal bones of the hands are shortened. The equivalent condition in the foot is brachymetatarsia, in which the metatarsal bones are shortened. Brachymetacarpia is typically congenital and presents in childhood or early adolescence, but it can also be associated with other acquired syndromes or endocrinological conditions. While cosmetic appearance is the most common concern of affected individuals, brachymetacarpia may also affect hand function due to alterations in muscle and tendon length. Treatment usually involves lengthening of the affected bone(s), either acutely with a bone graft or gradually with an external fixator.

This condition is one of the causes of brachydactyly.

== Epidemiology ==
Prevalence of brachymetacarpia is unknown. The third, fourth, and fifth metacarpals are most commonly affected.
