= Arterial dysplasia =

Conditions affecting arteries

- Specialty: Cardiology

Arterial dysplasia is a term that refers to a group of conditions that affect the structure and function of the arteries. One of the most common types of arterial dysplasia is fibromuscular dysplasia.
