= Waardenburg anophthalmia syndrome =

- Other names: Anophthalmia with limb anomalies
- Specialty: Medical genetics
- Symptoms: anophthalmia/microphthalmia with limb anomalies
- Complications: Vision impairment
- Usual onset: Birth
- Duration: Life-long
- Causes: Autosomal recessive inheritance
- Prevention: none
- Frequency: very rare, about 29 cases have been reported in medical literature from South America, Europe, and Western Asia.
- Deaths: -

Waardenburg anophthalmia syndrome is a rare autosomal recessive genetic disorder which is characterized by either microphthalmia or anophthalmia, osseous synostosis, ectrodactylism, polydactylism, and syndactylism. So far (according to OMIM), 29 cases from families in Brazil, Italy, Turkey, and Lebanon have been reported worldwide. This condition is caused by homozygous mutations in the SMOC1 gene, in chromosome 14.

== Discovery ==
This condition was first discovered in 1983, by Richiera-Costa et al., when they described two consanguineous Brazilian families with the symptoms mentioned above, out of the five children affected, one of them had unilateral anophthalmia and four of them had bilateral anophthalmia, combined with limb anomalies. The parents were consanguineous and weren't affected with the symptoms themselves, thus autosomal recessive inheritance was demonstrated and it was proposed this case was part of a novel syndrome.

In 2011, Okada et al. and others found the genetic cause in 10 families with the disorder: a mutation in the SMOC1 gene in chromosome 14.
