= X-linked sideroblastic anemia and spinocerebellar ataxia =

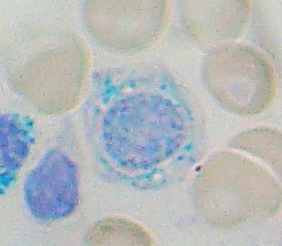
- Specialty: Medical genetics
- Symptoms: Sideroblastic anemia and spinocerebellar ataxia inherited in an X-linked recessive manner
- Complications: Walking
- Prevention: none
- Frequency: very rare, 4 families have been described in medical literature
- Deaths: -

X-linked sideroblastic anemia and spinocerebellar ataxia is a very rare genetic disorder which is characterized by mild sideroblastic anemia, and spinocerebellar ataxia that either doesn't progress or does so very slowly. Additional findings include dysarthria, tremors and eye movement anomalies. It is caused by X-linked recessive mutations in the ABCB7 gene in chromosome X. Only 4 families with the disorder have been described in medical literature.
