= Ankylosing vertebral hyperostosis with tylosis =

- Specialty: Medical genetics

Ankylosing vertebral hyperostosis with tylosis is a rare autosomal dominant genetic disorder characterized by ossification of the paraspinal ligament, sclerosis of the sacroiliac joint, and punctate hyperkeratosis (affecting the soles and palms). Some people with the condition are actually asymptomatic, which means they're relatively unaffected by it, the people who do show symptoms of it usually only show chronic/recurring back pain ranging from mild to moderate and, occasionally, obesity. It has only been described in 8 members of a 2-generation Greek Cypriot family. It is a type of dysostosis.
