= Brachial amelia, cleft lip, and holoprosencephaly =

- Specialty: Medical genetics
- Prevention: none
- Prognosis: varies
- Frequency: very rare, only 5 cases have been reported in medical literature

Brachial amelia, cleft lip, and holoprosencephaly, or Yim–Ebbin syndrome, is a very rare multi-systemic genetic disorder which is characterized by brachial amelia (mainly that affecting the upper limbs) cleft lip, and forebrain defects such as holoprosencephaly. Approximately five cases of this disorder have been described in medical literature.

Other signs include hydrocephalus and an iris coloboma. It was first described by Yim and Ebbin in 1982, and later by Thomas and Donnai in 1994. In 1996, a third case was reported by Froster et al. who suggested that the three cases were related and represented a distinct syndrome. In 2000, a similar case was reported by Pierri et al.
