= PRKD2 =

Protein-coding gene in the species Homo sapiens

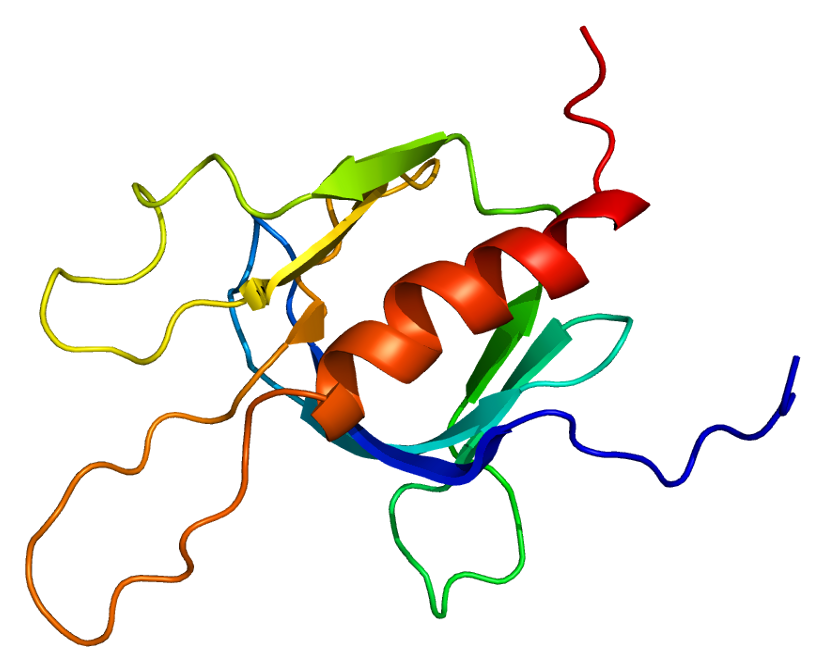

Identifiers
- Aliases: PRKD2, PKD2, nPKC-D2, HSPC187, protein kinase D2
- External IDs: OMIM: 607074; MGI: 2141917; GeneCards: PRKD2
Available structures
PDB	Ortholog search: PDBe RCSB
PDB	List of PDB id codes 2COA, 3BGM, 4NNX, 4NNY
Enzyme activity
EC #	BRENDA	ExPASy	KEGG	MetaCyc
2.7.11.13	↗	↗	↗	↗

Gene location (Human)
Chr.	Chromosome 19 (human)
Band	19q13.32	Start	46,674,275 bp
Band	19q13.32	End	46,717,127 bp

Gene location (Mouse)
Chr.	Chromosome 7 (mouse)
Band	7|7 A2	Start	16,576,827 bp
Band	7|7 A2	End	16,604,389 bp
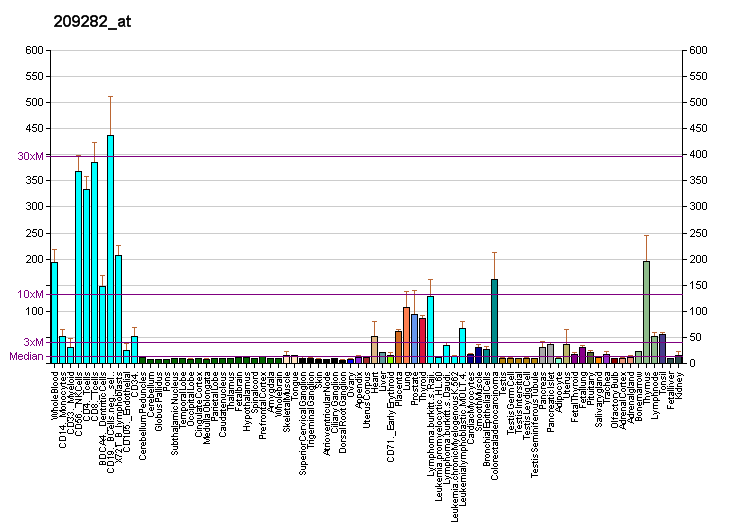

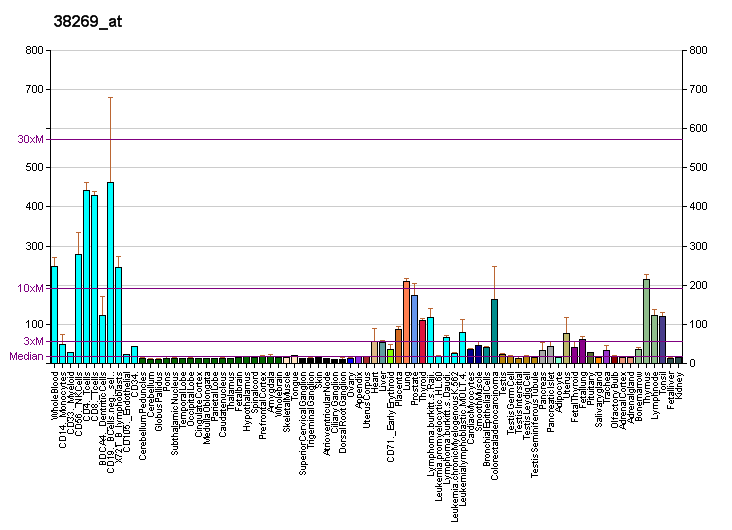
RNA expression pattern
Bgee	Human / Mouse (ortholog); Top expressed in: vena cava; superficial temporal artery; Skeletal muscle tissue of rectus abdominis; granulocyte; spleen; body of tongue; pylorus; lactiferous duct; cardia; skin of leg / Top expressed in: thymus; granulocyte; mesenteric lymph nodes; spleen; blood; primary oocyte; right lung; right lung lobe; left lung; external carotid artery; More reference expression data
BioGPS	More reference expression data
Gene ontology
Molecular function	transferase activity; protein kinase activity; nucleotide binding; protein kinase C activity; metal ion binding; kinase activity; protein binding; ATP binding; protein serine/threonine kinase activity; protein kinase C binding
Cellular component	cytoplasm; Golgi apparatus; membrane; nucleoplasm; nucleus; cytosol; plasma membrane; intracellular anatomical structure
Biological process	positive regulation of vascular endothelial growth factor receptor signaling pathway; intracellular signal transduction; positive regulation of endothelial cell proliferation; adaptive immune response; phosphorylation; immune system process; endothelial tube morphogenesis; positive regulation of fibroblast growth factor receptor signaling pathway; positive regulation of T cell receptor signaling pathway; positive regulation of endothelial cell chemotaxis; positive regulation of DNA-binding transcription factor activity; cell death; protein kinase D signaling; positive regulation of intracellular signal transduction; positive regulation of peptidyl-serine phosphorylation; positive regulation of angiogenesis; positive regulation of endothelial cell migration; protein phosphorylation; positive regulation of histone deacetylase activity; positive regulation of CREB transcription factor activity; vascular endothelial growth factor receptor signaling pathway; cell adhesion; positive regulation of NF-kappaB transcription factor activity; positive regulation of interleukin-2 production; angiogenesis; positive regulation of interleukin-8 production; positive regulation of blood vessel endothelial cell migration; positive regulation of DNA biosynthetic process; positive regulation of ERK1 and ERK2 cascade; positive regulation of endothelial cell chemotaxis by VEGF-activated vascular endothelial growth factor receptor signaling pathway; protein autophosphorylation; cellular response to vascular endothelial growth factor stimulus; T cell receptor signaling pathway; positive regulation of transcription by RNA polymerase II; positive regulation of cell adhesion; sphingolipid biosynthetic process; peptidyl-serine phosphorylation; peptidyl-threonine phosphorylation
Sources:Amigo / QuickGO
Orthologs
Databases	NCBI: entry; OMA: entry
Species	Human	Mouse
Entrez	25865	101540
Ensembl	ENSG00000105287	ENSMUSG00000041187
UniProt	Q9BZL6	Q8BZ03
RefSeq (mRNA)	NM_001079880; NM_001079881; NM_001079882; NM_016457	NM_001252458; NM_178900
RefSeq (protein)	NP_001073349; NP_001073350; NP_001073351; NP_057541	NP_001239387; NP_849231
Location (UCSC)	Chr 19: 46.67 – 46.72 Mb	Chr 7: 16.58 – 16.6 Mb
PubMed search
- Wikidata
View/Edit Human	View/Edit Mouse

Serine/threonine-protein kinase D2 or PKD2 is an enzyme that in humans is encoded by the PRKD2 gene.

== Function ==
The protein encoded by this gene belongs to the protein kinase D (PKD) family of serine/threonine protein kinases, a subfamily of protein kinase C. This kinase can be activated by phorbol esters as well as by gastrin via the cholecystokinin B receptor (CCKBR) in gastric cancer cells. It can bind to diacylglycerol (DAG) in the trans-Golgi network (TGN) and may regulate basolateral membrane protein exit from TGN. Alternative splicing results in multiple transcript variants encoding different isoforms.
