= SHORT syndrome =

- Other names: -Aarskog-Ose-Pande syndrome -lipodystrophy-Rieger anomaly-diabetes syndrome -Rieger anomaly-partial lipodystrophy syndrome -PIK3R1-associated syndromic insulin resistance with lipoatrophy
- SHORT syndrome is inherited in an autosomal dominant manner
- Specialty: Multidisciplinary
- Causes: PIK3R1 mutation.
- Frequency: Rare, less than 50 cases have been reported.

SHORT syndrome is an uncommon autosomal-dominant condition marked by ocular depression, Rieger anomaly, teething delay, small height, hyperextensibility of joints, and/or hernias. It was characterized in 1975.

== Signs and symptoms ==
The acronym SHORT, which stands for characteristic traits seen in the majority of patients, is incorporated into the name of the condition. These features include the following:

Short stature.

Hyperextensibility of the joints and/or inguinal hernias.

Ocular depression.

Rieger anomaly.

Delayed teething.

Additional clinical features include intrauterine growth restriction, facial dysmorphism (deep-set eyes, prominent forehead, hypoplastic or thin alae nasi, small chin, large low-set ears, border, and downturned mouth), wrinkled and thin skin emphasizing a progeroid appearance, and mild midface hypoplasia.

Lipodystrophy, or the absence of adipose tissue beneath the skin, is another common characteristic of the condition that primarily affects the face, arms, and chest. The thin, transparent skin shows more blood vessels when there is insufficient adipose tissue. Progeria is the term for the appearance of premature aging in persons with the illness, who appear much older than their actual age.

== Diagnosis ==
Diagnosis is based on facial characteristics and molecular genetic testing that will show a mutation on gene PIK3R1 (5q13.1), which codifies the regulating alpha subunit of phosphatidylinositol 3-kinase. This mutation can alter the PI3K/AKT/mTOR signal route, which plays an important role in cell growth and proliferation.

== Treatment ==
Treatment involves multiple disciplines.

-Screening for insulin resistance during late childhood stage.

-Glucose intolerance and diabetes mellitus can be treated with a different diet and lifestyle changes.

-Regular eye checkups are recommended in order to keep vision.

-Dental anomalies can be treated with common methods (protheses, crown, etc.)
