= Tibial hemimelia-polysyndactyly-triphalangeal thumb syndrome =

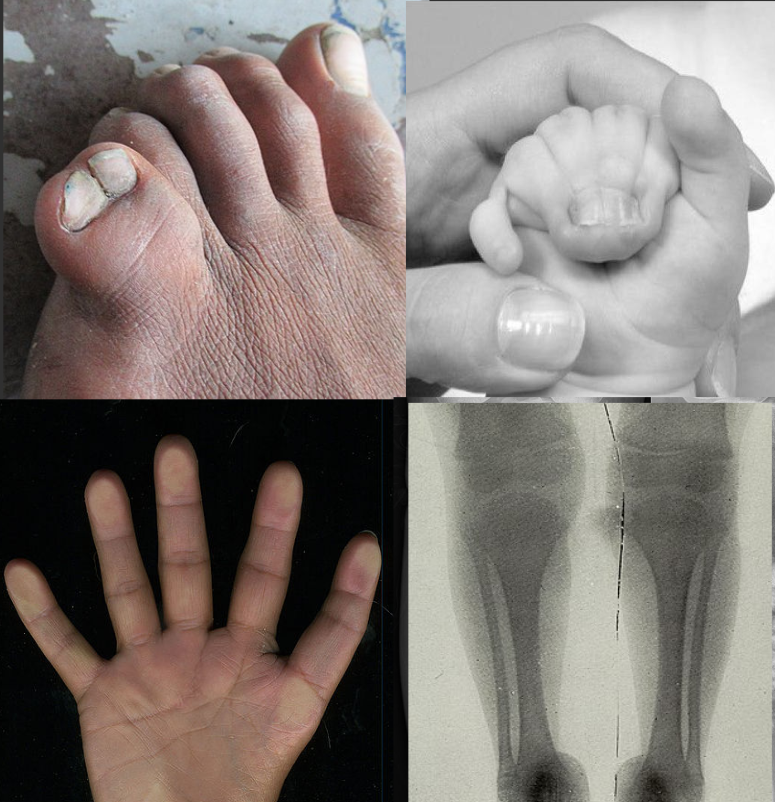
- Specialty: Medical genetics
- Symptoms: Minor physical anomalies
- Complications: Grip, walking
- Usual onset: Pre-natal
- Duration: Life-long
- Causes: Autosomal dominant genetic mutation
- Diagnostic method: Physical examination, radiography
- Prevention: none
- Prognosis: Good
- Frequency: Rare, around 20 families worldwide are known to have the disorder to medical literature.

Tibial hemimelia-polysyndactyly-triphalangeal thumb syndrome is a rare genetic limb malformation syndrome which is characterized by thumb triphalangy, polysyndactyly of the hand and foot, and hypoplasia/aplasia of the tibia bone. Additional features include short stature, radio-ulnar synostosis, ectrodactyly and abnormalities of the carpals and metatarsals. Only 19 affected families worldwide have been recorded in medical literature. It is associated with a heterozygous base pair substitution of A to G in position 404–406, located on intron 5 in the LMBR1 gene.
