= Aortic arch anomaly - peculiar facies - intellectual disability =

- Specialty: Medical genetics
- Symptoms: heart anomalies, craniofacial dysmorphisms, and intellectual disabilities
- Usual onset: Birth
- Duration: Lifelong
- Causes: Autosomal dominant inheritance
- Frequency: Only 4 cases reported
- Deaths: 2-4

Aortic arch anomaly - peculiar facies - intellectual disability is a rare, genetic, congenital developmental anomaly that is characterized by heart abnormalities, cranio-facial dysmorphia, and intellectual disabilities. No new cases have been reported since 1968.

== Signs and symptoms ==
People with this disorder usually have the following symptoms:

=== Heart ===
- Right-sided aortic arch

=== Craniofacial ===
- Microcephaly
- Facial asymmetry
- Frontal bossing
- Hypertelorism
- Deviated nasal septum
- Rather large nasal cavity
- Prominent, rotated ears
- Microstomia

=== Intellect ===
- Intellectual disabilities

== Etiology ==
This disorder was first discovered in 1968, when a mother and 3 of her children (4 cases) were described with the symptoms mentioned above. In this case, additional features were found in a majority of the patients; three of the patients had esophageal indentation and left ligamentum arteriosum, two of the patients, a still-born baby, had anencephaly. Another child died due to congenital heart disease. The child in question also had microcephaly. This disorder is suspected to be autosomal dominant.
