= Alopecia contractures dwarfism intellectual disability syndrome =

- Other names: Alopecia-contractures-dwarfism-intellectual disability syndrome
- Specialty: Neurology, Genetic disorder

Alopecia contractures dwarfism intellectual disability syndrome (or ACD intellectual disability syndrome) is a developmental disorder which causes mainly baldness and dwarfism in combination with intellectual disability; skeletal anomalies, caries and nearsightedness are also typical.

ACD intellectual disability syndrome was first described in 1980 by Albert Schinzel and only few cases have since been identified in the world. At the time Dr. Schinzel made no conclusion of the hereditary pattern of this syndrome but similarities between cases reported by year 2000 seem to suggest autosomal or x-linked recessive inheritance or possibly a dominant mutation caused by mosaicism as causes of this syndrome.
