= Agenesis of the vena cava =

Agenesis of the vena cava is a genetic defect of the inferior vena cava. It comes about when, during development of the foetus, the right subcardinal vein does not connect as it should to the hepatic sinusoids..

Agenesis of the superior vena cava may also occur; it is very rare.
