= Anophthalmia megalocornea cardiopathy skeletal anomalies syndrome =

- Other names: None.
- Specialty: Medical genetics
- Symptoms: ocular, muscular, heart and skeletal anomalies
- Complications: Blindness, death, bullying
- Usual onset: Birth
- Duration: Life-long
- Causes: Autosomal recessive inheritance
- Diagnostic method: Physical examination
- Prevention: none
- Frequency: Very rare

Anophthalmia megalocornea cardiopathy skeletal anomalies syndrome is an extremely rare multi-systemic genetic disorder which is characterized by congenital ocular, muscular, and heart abnormalities. It was first described in the children of a consanguineous couple, and it is thought to be autosomal recessive disorder with variable expressity. No new cases have been described in medical literature since 1992.

== Presentation ==
People with this disorder usually have the following symptoms: dolichocephaly, asymmetrical skull, camptodactyly, talipes equinovarus, muscular hypoplasia, anophthalmia, buphthalmos, retinal detachment, aniridia, tricuspid valve prolapse, and mitral and tricuspid deficiency.
