= Al-Gazali-Donnai-Mueller syndrome =

- Other names: Hirschsprung's disease, hypoplastic nails, and minor dysmorphic features syndrome
- Specialty: Medical genetics
- Symptoms: Partial absence of nerves in the intestines, facial dysmorphisms and nail hypoplasia
- Complications: Death
- Usual onset: Birth
- Duration: Life-long (short life span)
- Causes: Genetic mutation
- Prevention: None
- Prognosis: Bad
- Frequency: very rare

Al-Gazali-Donnai-Mueller syndrome, also known as Hirschsprung's disease, hypoplastic nails, and minor dysmorphic features syndrome, is a rare and deadly genetic disorder which is characterized by Hirschsprung's disease, nail and distal limb hypoplasia, flat facies, upslanting palpebral fissures, narrow philtrum, high palate, micrognathia and low-set ears. No more new cases have been reported in medical literature since 1988. It is a type of Hirschsprung's syndrome.

== Signs and symptoms ==
The signs and symptoms of Al-Gazali-Donnai-Mueller syndrome are the following Abnormal facial shape; flat facies, upward slanting palpebral fissures, a narrow philtrum, a narrow high-arched palate, micrognathia and low-set ears with abnormal helices. Aganglionic megacolon is also present with anal atresia, hydronephrosis, inguinal hernia, small/hypoplastic nails and distal limb hypoplasia.

== Diagnosis ==
The diagnostic method for Al-Gazali-Donnai-Mueller Syndrome is from the basis of complete physical examination, thorough medical history evaluations, assessments of signs and symptoms, laboratory tests, imaging studies and MRIs and biopsy studies, if necessary. Many clinical conditions may have similar signs and symptoms, so your healthcare provider may carry out various tests in case they misdiagnose.
