= Absent tibia-polydactyly-arachnoid cyst syndrome =

- Other names: Holmes-Collins syndrome
- Specialty: Medical genetics
- Frequency: 0.0001%

Absent tibia-polydactyly-arachnoid cyst syndrome, also known as Holmes-Collins syndrome, is a very rare multi-systemic hereditary disorder which is characterized by facial dysmorphisms, pre/post-axial polydactyly, toe syndactyly, missing/underdeveloped tibia bone, and the presence of a retrocerebellar arachnoid cyst. Additional findings include clubbed feet, cleft lip, diaphragm agenesis, and radial and ulnar anomalies.

It was first discovered in 1995 by Holmes et al., when they described three siblings (one male and two females) born to consanguineous, first cousin once removed parents with the symptoms mentioned above (including the additional ones), Holmes et al. did not find abnormalities in the HOXD10, HOXA9, and HOXC9 genes. They concluded this was part of a brand new (novel) autosomal recessive syndrome.
