= Aortopulmonary space =

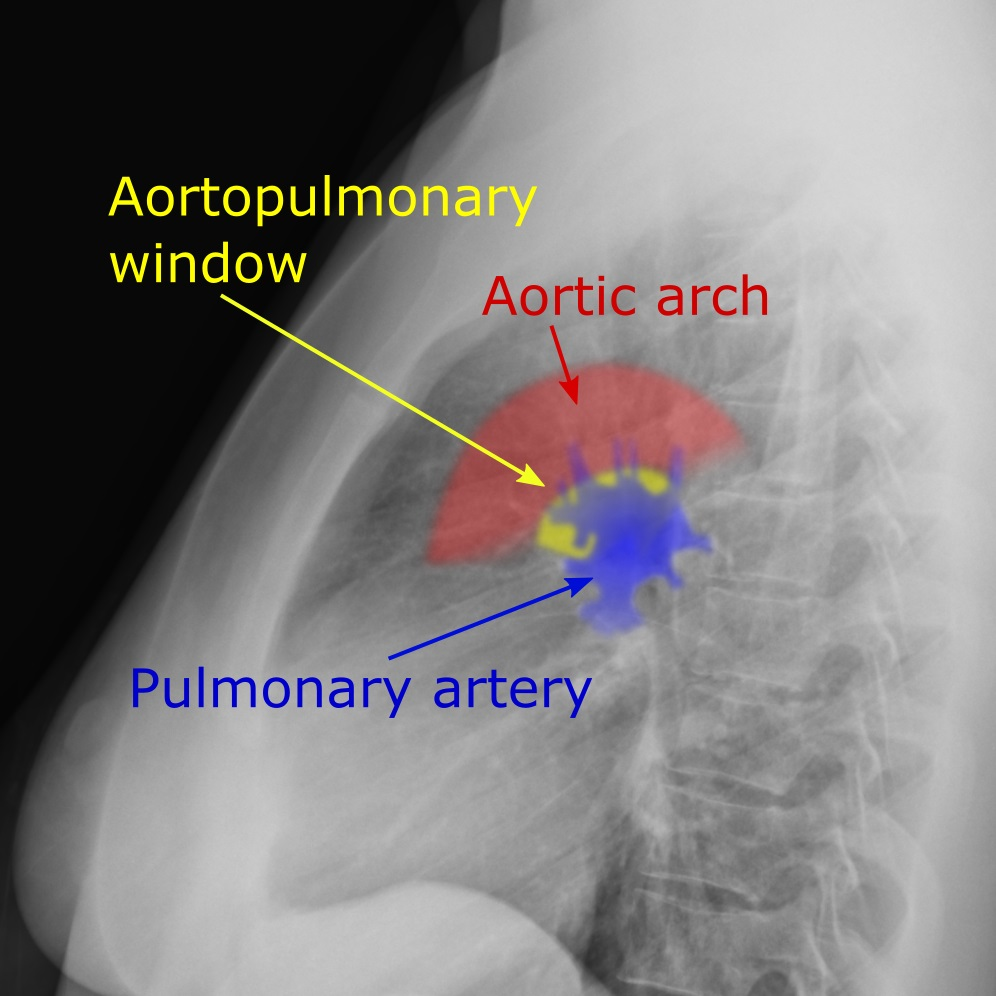
On a lateral chest radiograph, the aortopulmonary space is normally seen as the "aortopulmonary window".

The aortopulmonary space, also known as aortopulmonary angle or aorto-pulmonary window, is a small space between the aortic arch and the pulmonary artery. It contains the ligamentum arteriosum, the left recurrent laryngeal nerve, lymph nodes, and fatty tissue. The space is bounded anteriorly by the ascending aorta, posteriorly by the descending aorta, medially by the left main bronchus, and laterally by mediastinal pleura.

The presence of water radiodensity in this space on radiography may indicate a lymphadenopathy or neoplasm is occupying this space.

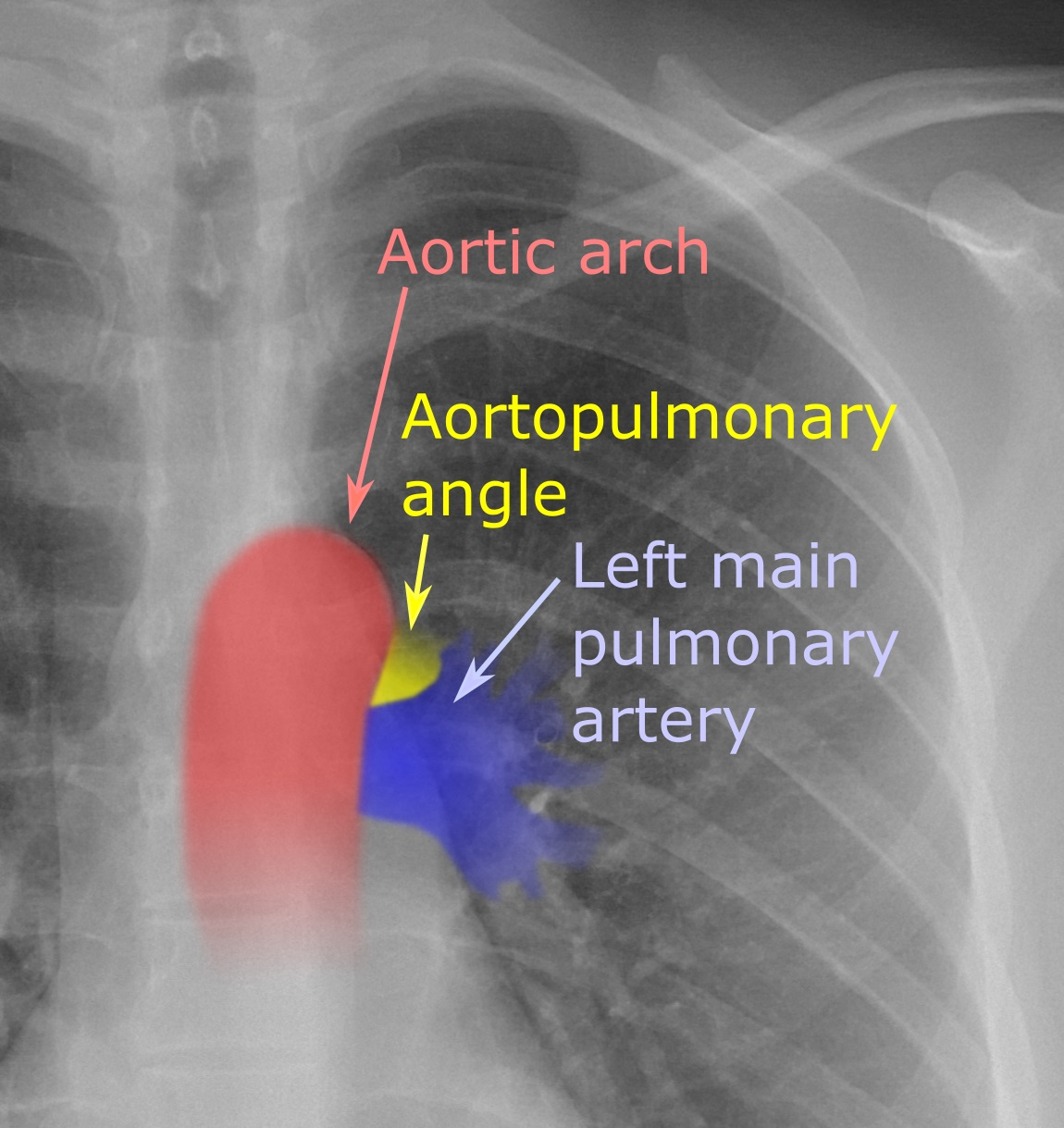
On a posteroanterior chest radiograph like this one, the left margin of the aortopulmonary space is normally seen as the "aortopulmonary angle".
