= Dyschromatosis symmetrica hereditaria =

- Other names: Acropigmentation of Dohi
- Dyschromatosis symmetrica hereditaria is inherited in an autosomal dominant manner

Dyschromatosis symmetrica hereditaria (also known as "reticulate acropigmentation of Dohi", and "symmetrical dyschromatosis of the extremities") is a rare autosomally inherited dermatosis. It is characterized by progressively pigmented and depigmented macules, often mixed in a reticulate pattern, concentrated on the dorsal extremities. It was first reported in Japan, but has also been found to affect individuals from Europe, India and the Caribbean.

== Genetics ==
This disease is caused by mutation in the double stranded RNA specific adenosine deaminase (ADAR1) gene. This gene is located on the long arm of chromosome 1 (1q21).

== Diagnosis ==
Diagnosis is by visualisation and skin biopsy.

== See also ==
- Skin lesion
