= Aldred syndrome =

- Other names: Retinitis pigmentosa and intellectual disability due to Xp11.3 microdeletion
- Symptoms: Intellectual disability Retinitis pigmentosa
- Usual onset: Congenital
- Causes: Deletion on X-chromosome p11.3

Aldred syndrome is an X-linked recessive genetic disorder. It is mainly characterized by a form of intellectual disability and retinitis pigmentosa. The syndrome was first described by geneticist Micheala Aldred in 1994.

== Cause ==
Aldred syndrome is caused by a deletion on the p11.3 area of the X-chromosome.
