= Angiolipoma =

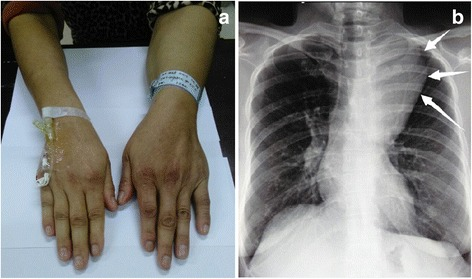
- Large mediastinal angiolipoma
- Specialty: Oncology

Angiolipoma is a subcutaneous nodule with vascular structure, having all other features of a typical lipoma. They are commonly painful. Angiolipomas manifest as multiple painful subcutaneous nodules commonly on the upper limbs. The can occur sporadically, with a family history or after trauma. Angiolipomas can be seen on CT scans and MRI but are diagnosed based on histopathology. Total excision or liposuction is used to treat angiolipomas. They are more common in men and usually appear in the second and third decades of life.

== Signs and symptoms ==
Angiolipoma typically manifests as many, painful subcutaneous nodules (solitary in only one-third of patients), most commonly originating in the upper limbs (of which the forearm accounts for around two thirds), trunk, and lower limbs. These lesions are well-defined, usually measuring less than 4 cm.

== Causes ==
The majority of the time, angiolipomas happen randomly, however in a small percentage of cases, a familial history is apparent. Usually, a history of trauma is linked to it. Angiolipomas frequently have PRKD2 mutations, according to a recent study.

== Diagnosis ==
Preoperative diagnostics for angiolipoma usually involve computed tomography (CT) with a hyperechoic mass and magnetic resonance imaging (MRI). Nevertheless, these techniques are not very good at giving a conclusive diagnosis for these malignancies. For this reason, a histological study is frequently necessary to provide a definitive diagnosis.

From a histological perspective, angiolipomas exhibit a variable mature adipocytic growth linked to a vascular component. The capillary-sized proliferation that makes up the majority of the vascular network is more noticeable towards the periphery. The presence of fibrin microthrombi, a nearly unique morphologic characteristic of angiolipoma, is characteristic of the blood vessels. The lesion may be adipocytic, and the degree of capillary development can range from negligible to prominent (cellular angiolipoma).

== Treatment ==
Total excision or liposuction is the appropriate course of action for the management of angiolipomas. After excision, the non-infiltrating subtype typically does not recur. Wide excision with distinct margins is necessary to reduce the likelihood of recurrence because the infiltrating subtype is linked to a 35% to 50% recurrence rate.

== Epidemiology ==
Angiolipoma represent 5% to 17% of all lipomas. Peak incidence occurs in the second and third decades of life. They primarily affect men.

== See also ==
- Lipoma
- List of cutaneous conditions
