= AIDS dysmorphic syndrome =

Human disease

AIDS dysmorphic syndrome, also called HIV embryopathy, is a cluster of facial malformations seen in children with perinatal HIV infection. Its status as a syndrome is disputed by the research community. Common symptoms of perinatal HIV infection include candidiasis, lymphocytic interstitial pneumonitis, hepatosplenomegaly, and lymphadenopathy.
