= Autosomal recessive isolated ectopia lentis =

- Other names: Ectopia lentis, isolated autosomal recessive.
- Specialty: Medical genetics, optometry
- Symptoms: Ectopia lentis with no other eye abnormalities (necessarily)
- Types: This is a subtype of isolated ectopia lentis, the other type is autosomal dominant isolated ectopia lentis.
- Causes: Genetic mutation
- Risk factors: Being part of a consanguineous family.
- Prevention: None
- Prognosis: Medium
- Frequency: rare, about 62 cases from 10–20 families worldwide have been described in medical literature
- Deaths: –

Autosomal recessive isolated ectopia lentis is a rare hereditary disorder which is characterized by ectopia lentis (that is; a condition that displaces the position of the eye's lens) that is present in both eyes with no other significant abnormalities. It is caused by mutations in the ADAMTSL4 gene, located in chromosome 1. These mutations are inherited in an autosomal recessive manner.

According to OMIM, approximately 62 cases from 10 to 20 families in the Middle East, Western Asia, and Europe have been described in medical literature.

Although no other ocular abnormalities are present in isolated ectopia lentis, the EL itself can lead to other ocular complications directly or indirectly related to it, such as myopia, astigmatism, hyperopia, cataract, glaucoma, and retinal detachment, which may lead to visual impairment (difficulties with vision) or even total blindness. Due to the displacement of the lenses in the eyes those affected may experience sudden bouts of blurred vision, this can be caused by blinking, a change in posture or moving the eyes resulting in the position of the lenses shifting. When they shift, the light entering the eyes doesn’t focus on the retinas properly.

Those affected should avoid contact sports to reduce the chance of trauma to the eye and head, this is due to the high risk of eye damage and further lens displacement.
