= Axial osteosclerosis =

Bone disorder

- Other names: Osteomesopyknosis
- Specialty: Orthopedics, medical genetics

Axial osteosclerosis, also known as osteomesopyknosis, is a bone disorder that causes osteosclerosis on the axial spine, pelvis and proximal part of the long bones. It is an autosomal-dominant disease. As of 2024, the exact causes were unknown.

== Population estimation ==
Fewer than 1000 people have this bone disorder in the United States.

== Symptoms ==
This bone disorder can begin to appear in the first years of life, as well as in adulthood. It may present with thoracic pain, kyphosis, scoliosis, vertebral body sclerosis, increased bone density, as well as abnormalities in the cortical bone and vertebrae.
