= Aplasia cutis-myopia syndrome =

Genetic disorder of the skin and eyes

- Other names: Aplasia cutis congenita, high myopia, and cone-rod dysfunction
- Specialty: Medical genetics

Aplasia cutis-myopia syndrome is a rare genetic disorder characterized by a combination of aplasia cutis congenita, high myopia, and dysfunction of the cone-rods. Other findings include congenital nystagmus, atrophy of the iris and pigment epithelium, easily scarred skin and keratoconus. Only 4 cases (from the United Kingdom and Israel, respectively) have been described in medical literature. Transmission is either autosomal dominant or autosomal recessive.
