= Autosomal recessive axonal neuropathy with neuromyotonia =

- Other names: Gamstorp-Wohlfart syndrome, Myokymia, myotonia, and muscle wasting, ARAN-NM, ARCMT2-NM, Autosomal recessive Charcot-Marie-Tooth disease type 2 with neuromyotonia, NMAN
- Specialty: Medical genetics

Autosomal recessive axonal neuropathy with neuromyotonia, also known as Gamstorp-Wohlfart syndrome, is a rare hereditary disorder which is characterized by progressive poly-neuropathy, neuromyotonia, myokymia, pseudo-myotonia, hand-foot contractures, and abnormal neuro-myotonic/myokimic activity visible on needle EMG. According to OMIM, around 52 cases have been reported in medical literature However; new cases (mostly from Europe and North America) have been reported since 2014.

== Presentation ==
People with this disorder usually show the following symptoms: axonal neuropathy, atrophy (wasting/degeneration) of the muscles in the hands, feet and legs, chronic muscular weakness which is very apparent when exercise is being done, abnormal gait, high chance of accidental falls, and joint contractures, neuromyotonia, and myokymia. In some people, the axonal neuropathy ends up reducing their sensitivity to cold and hot temperatures and touch in the distal parts of the arms and legs. Some of the symptoms worsen temporarily when a person with this disorder is exposed to cold temperatures.

== Causes ==
This disorder is caused by a homozygous mutation in the HINT1 gene, in chromosome 5 (c.334 C > A, p.H112 N).

== Etymology ==
This condition was discovered in 1991 by Hahn et al., when they described two Chinese-Canadian siblings of the opposite sex. The male had difficulties releasing his grip, childhood-onset neuromyotonia and muscle stiffness, progressive motor neuropathy, finger cramping while and after writing, involuntary twitches of the finger, thigh and forearm muscles, foot drop-associated gait problems, hand weakness, hyporeflexia, and tongue percussion, his younger sister wasn't as affected as his brother, she only shared some of his symptoms, these include; upper and lower distal muscle weakness. Both siblings were revealed to have a chronic motor neuropathy, peripheral nerve fiber hyperexcitability, and multiple denervations. Muscle biopsies performed in the brother detected chronic partial denervation.

Through the siblings reported by Hahn et al. and 50 new patients from 33 families across the world, it was found that this disorder is caused by HINT1 mutations.
