= Blepharochalasis =

Eyelid disease

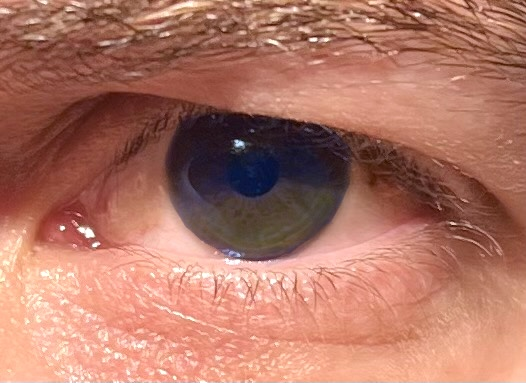
- Blefarocalasi
- Specialty: Dermatology

Blepharochalasis is an inflammation of the eyelid that is characterized by exacerbations and remissions of eyelid edema, which results in a stretching and subsequent atrophy of the eyelid tissue, leading to the formation of redundant folds over the lid margins. It typically affects only the upper eyelids, and may be unilateral as well as bilateral.

== Signs and symptoms ==
Recurrent episodes of eyelid edema can be observed with spontaneous resolution. After multiple episodes the eyelid looses elasticity, clinically represented as eyelid drooping, wrinkled eyelid skin and in severe conditions, as ptosis. The edema episode starts suddenly but it is painless.

== Causes ==
Recurrent eyelid edema and inflammation are usually allergic or immune-mediated in origin. The exact etiology underlying immune system dysregulation and vascular issues causing the episodes are not yet fully understood (idiopathic). Hormonal changes are thought to contribute the blepharochalasis, which particularly occur in early adulthood (puberty).
