= Acanthocheilonemiasis =

- Specialty: Infectious diseases

Acanthocheilonemiasis is a rare tropical infectious disease caused by a parasite known as Acanthocheilonema perstans. It can cause skin rashes, abdominal and chest pains, muscle and joint pains, neurological disorders and skin lumps. It is mainly found in Africa. The parasite is transmitted through the bite of small flies. Studies show that there are elevated levels of white blood cells.

Acanthocheilonemiasis belongs to a group of parasitic diseases known as filarial disease (nematode), all of which are classified as Neglected Tropical Diseases. Filarial disease results when microfilariae, which are nematode larvae, reach the lymphatic system; microfilariae reside in the serous cavities of humans. They have a five-stage life cycle that includes birth to thousands of live microfilariae within the host (i.e. human body), and then translocation via blood meal to the dermis layer of the skin. It is here that microfilariae cause major symptoms, which are edema and thickening of the skin and underlying connective tissues. It can also cause skin rashes, abdominal and chest pains, muscle (myalgia) and joint pains, neurological disorders and skin lumps. In addition, it causes spleen and liver enlargement, which is called hepatosplenomegaly. Studies show elevated levels of leukocytes, or white blood cells, which is referred to as eosinophilia. It is mainly found in Africa. The parasite is transmitted through the bite of small flies (A. coliroides).

== Symptoms ==
Generally speaking, acanthocheilonemiasis does not show initial symptoms. However, if symptoms do arise, it is typically in individuals who are visiting highly infected areas rather than natives to those areas. A major common laboratory finding is an increase in specialized white blood cells, which is called eosinophilia.

Other symptoms include itchy skin, neurological symptoms, abdominal and chest pain, muscle pain, and swelling underneath the skin. If there are abnormally high levels of white blood cells, then a physical examination will most likely find an enlarged spleen or liver.

In certain scenarios, nematodes may physically lodge into the chest or abdomen, resulting in an inflammation. Diagnosis of this condition usually occurs via a blood smear examination under light microscopy.

== Diagnosis ==
Absolute eosinophilia in immigrants that is correlated with parasitic diseases that may go undiagnosed. Absolute eosinophilia is clinically diagnosed as >0.45 billion eosinophilic leucocytes/L of peripheral blood. Recent studies suggest that around 60% of children with relative eosinophilia contracted this via parasitic infections. Relative eosinophilia is different from absolute because relative refers to an increase in percentage of white blood cells (i.e. leukocytes) due to a loss of blood plasma; where as absolute eosinophilia is purely an increase in white blood cell production. Of those with relative eosinophilia, 40% were undiagnosed until these studies. Therefore, there is a great need for thorough parasitological studies in this area of tropical infectious diseases.

== Treatments ==
The standard of care is administration of antifilarial drugs, most commonly Ivermectin or diethyl-carbamazine (DEC). The most efficacious dose in all nematode and parasitic infections is 200 μg/kg of ivermectin. There has also been other various anthelminthic drugs used, such as mebendazole, levamisole, albendazole and thiabendazole. In worst-case scenarios, surgery may be necessary to remove nematodes from the abdomen or chest. However, mild cases usually do not require treatment.

== Epidemiology ==
Acanthocheilonemiasis is caused by the parasite, mansonella perstans. M. perstans is primarily found in central Africa and in some areas of South America, therefore the most affected populations are located in these areas. Acanthocheilonemiasis affects humans in these areas in equal numbers. The prevalence of this condition does significantly increase with age. Furthermore, the parasite is most commonly found in areas of tropical forests with alternating swamps and open ground.

Approximately 114 million people in Africa are infected with M. perstans, including 33 sub-Saharan African countries. Recent studies focused on Gabon specifically, where febrile and tropical diseases are common. Contrary to popular recent suggestions, M. perstans does not influence the emergence of febrile diseases, including HIV, tuberculosis, bacteremia, and malaria. In general, hemoglobin levels in individuals with malaria are severely reduced from that of a healthy individual. Reduced levels occur because the malaria parasite, Plasmodium falciparum, utilizes human hemoglobin as its major energy source. Filariasis, in combination with severe malaria, actually shows higher hemoglobin levels than in severe malaria alone. In addition, M. perstans did not have adverse effects on those with HIV, as there were actually higher levels of CD4 in HIV patients co-infected with M. perstans.

Tropical and sub-tropical regions are the main areas affected by nematodes and parasitic worms, which often causes filariasis. Around 20% of immigrants to Spain are children from these regions.

== History ==
The clinical manifestations of A. perstans were first discovered in London in the blood of a patient from West Africa in 1890. The parasite was originally called Filaria sanguinis hominis minor because it was similar to another microfilariae, except smaller. Microfilariae are small larvae that have the ability to enter the body's circulation. Filaria sanguinis hominis minor is now called Filaria perstans, which was established by the International Commission on Zoological Nomenclature.

Since its discovery, Acanthocheilonemiasis has had several other names. It was first known as mansonelliasis, which referred to an infectious disease of any of three parasite species, including ozzardi, perstans, and streptocerca that share similar life cycle characteristics. However, it is now widely accepted as M. perstans. Other synonyms for acanthocheilonemiasis include: Dipetalonemiasis, Dipetalonema perstans, Mansonalla perstans, and Acanthocheilonemiasis perstans.

== Research ==
Parasitic worms and nematodes regulate many immune pathways of their host in order to increase their chances of survival. For example, molecules secreted by Acanthocheilonema vitae actually limit host effective immune mechanisms. These molecules are called excretory-secretory products. An effective excretory-secretory product released from Acanthochelionema vitae is called ES-62, which can affect multiple immune system cell types. ES-62 has anti-inflammatory effects when subjected to mice. The anti-inflammatory effect occurs because of a phosphorylcholine (PC)-containing moiety and signal transduction. More research needs to be completed; however there is some evidence that Acanthocheilonema vitae may have anti-inflammatory effects, and should be researched further.
