= Amaurosis congenita, cone-rod type, with congenital hypertrichosis =

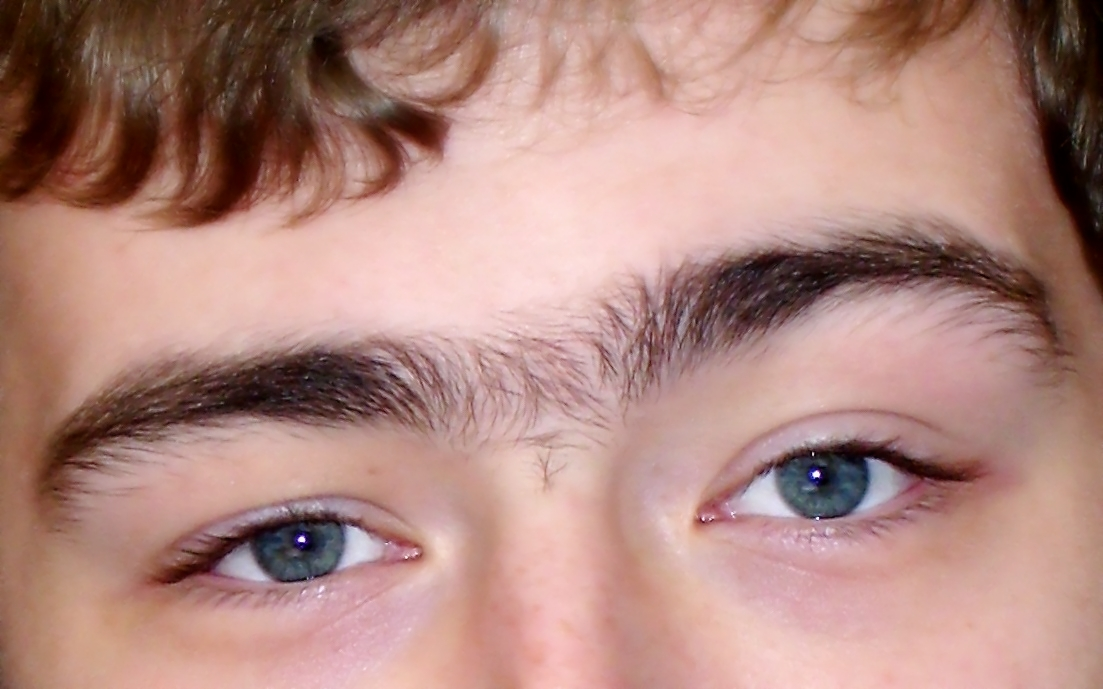
- Specialty: Medical genetics
- Prevention: None
- Prognosis: Good
- Frequency: Very rare
- Deaths: -

Amaurosis congenita, cone-rod type, with congenital hypertrichosis is a very rare genetic disorder which is characterized by ocular anomalies and trichomegaly. It is inherited in an autosomal recessive manner. Only two cases have been described in medical literature.

== Signs and symptoms ==
This is a list of the symptoms that this condition causes:

- Cone-rod type amaurosis congenita
- Severe corneal dystrophy
- Vision impairment
- Severe photophobia which isn't associated to nyctalopia
- Thick eyebrows
- Synophrys
- Hypertrichosis
- Hypermetropia
- Hirsutism

== Etymology ==
It has been described in two cousins born to consanguineous parents, both of them had the same symptoms.
