= Al Gazali Sabrinathan Nair syndrome =

- Other names: Al Gazali-Nair syndrome, Osteogenesis imperfecta-retinopathy-seizures-intellectual disability syndrome
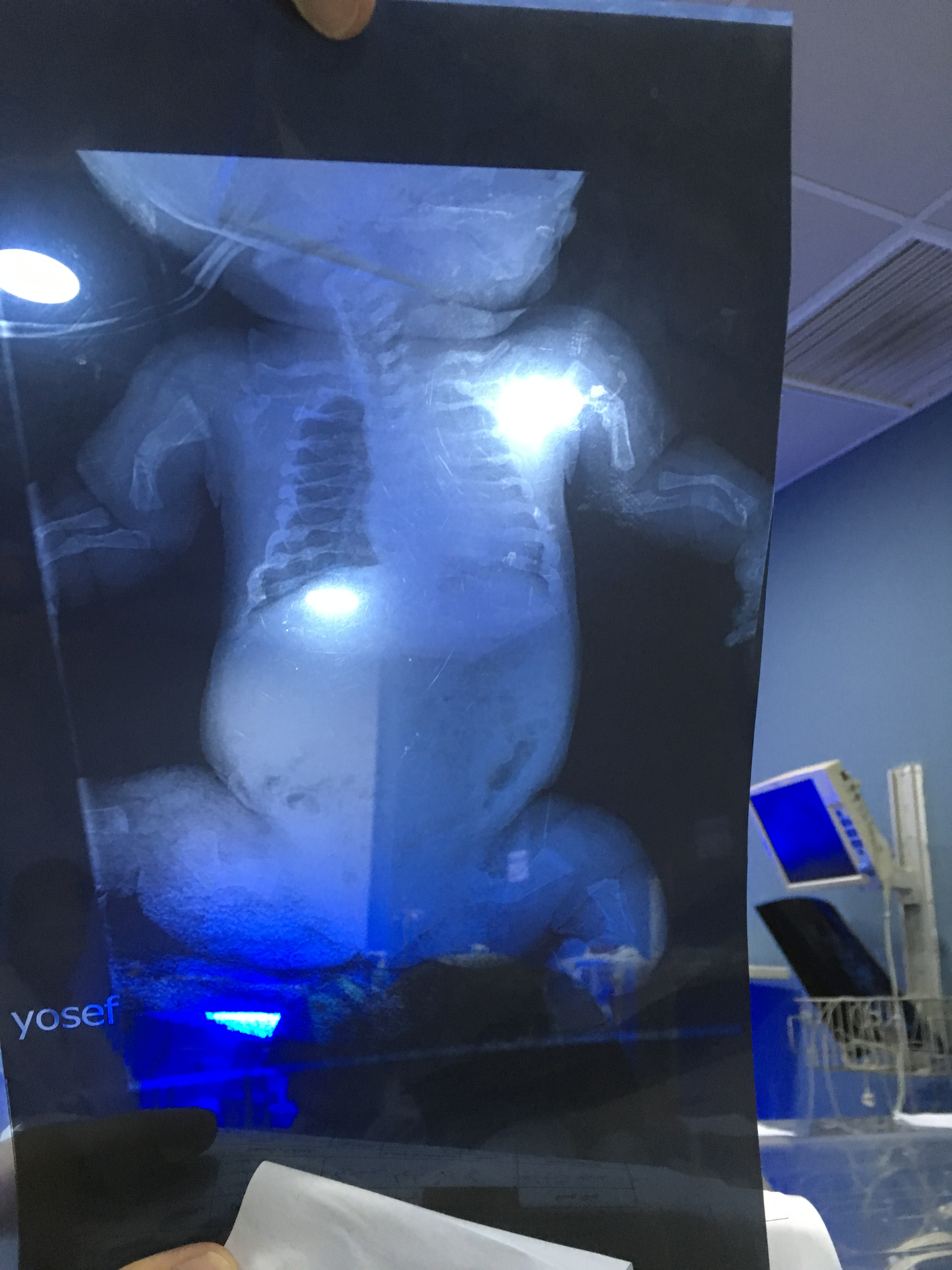
- Specialty: Medical genetics
- Symptoms: Ocular, skeletal and developmental abnormalities with facial dysmorphisms
- Usual onset: Birth
- Duration: Life-long
- Causes: Genetic mutation
- Prevention: None
- Frequency: Very rare, only 2 cases reported in medical literature

Al Gazali Sabrinathan Nair syndrome, also known as Al Gazali-Nair syndrome, is a very rare multi-systemic genetic disorder which is characterized by developmental delay, facial dysmorphy, and skeletal and ocular abnormalities. This disorder was first described in two siblings that came from consanguineous parents. No new cases have been described since 1994.

== Presentation ==
People with this disorder show the following signs and symptoms:

- Long eyelashes
- Frontal bossing
- Low frontal hairline
- Hypertelorism
- Medial eyebrow flare
- Low nasal bridge
- Low-set large ears
- Osteogenesis imperfecta
- Widespread developmental delay
- Wormian bones
- Epilepsy
- Blue sclerae
- Optic degeneration
- Retinal detachment
