= AREDYLD syndrome =

- AREDYLD syndrome is inherited in an autosomal recessive manner
- Specialty: Endocrinology

AREDYLD stands for acral renal ectodermal dysplasia lipoatrophic diabetes. AREDLYD is categorized as a rare disease, meaning it affects fewer than 200,000 people in the American population at any given time.

It was characterized in 1983. A second case was identified in 1992.
