= Absence of gluteal muscle =

The congenital absence of the gluteal muscle was described in 1976, as occurring in a brother and sister with the absence of gluteal muscles and with spina bifida occulta. It was thought to be caused by an autosomal recessive gene.

There was a case of a 28-month-old with renal ectopia who showed an absence of the gluteal muscle with no spina bifida occulta. This is the only confirmed case of absence of gluteal muscle without spina bifida.
