= Alwadei syndrome =

- Other names: Autosomal recessive mental retardation-61, Mental retardation, autosomal recessive 61, MRT61
- Alwadei syndrome has an autosomal recessive pattern of inheritance.
- Specialty: Neurology
- Symptoms: dysmorphic facial features, intellectual disability, delayed psychomotor development, neurological malformations, seizures
- Usual onset: Infancy

Alwadei syndrome or autosomal recessive mental retardation-61 (MRT61) is an autosomal recessive neurodevelopmental disorder characterized by delayed psychomotor development, intellectual disability, and variable abnormal facial features. Severe patients may develop refractory seizures and have brain abnormalities, including hypoplasia of the corpus callosum. Alwadei syndrome attributed to mutation in RUSC2 gene on chromosome 9p13.3.

== Signs and symptoms ==
Patients with Alwadei syndrome typically have moderate to severe intellectual disability. Speech is delayed and once acquired is limited to single words. Behavioral problems such as hyperactivity, aggression and autistic features can occur. As of 2017 three patients with Alwadei syndrome have been reported, all of whom have been dependent on assistance in all aspects of daily living.

Hypotonia occurs in infancy and in most cases later progresses to mild spasticity in all four limbs. Walking is delayed and in all cases is unsteady. Joint hyperlaxity may occur.

== History ==
It was first described at King Fahd Medical City by the pediatric neurologist Ali Alwadei in 2014. The syndrome was recognized and published in medical journal Developmental Medicine & Child Neurology in 2016. In 2017, Johns Hopkins University named the syndrome as "Alwadei syndrome".
