= Ayazi syndrome =

- Other names: Choroideremia-deafness-obesity syndrome
- This condition is inherited in an X-linked recessive manner.

Ayazi syndrome (or Chromosome 21 Xq21 deletion syndrome) is a syndrome characterized by choroideremia, congenital deafness and obesity.

== Signs and symptoms ==
The presentation for this condition is as follows:

- Intellectual disability
- Deafness at birth
- Obesity
- Choroideremia
- Impaired vision
- Progressive degeneration of the choroid

== Genetics ==
Ayazi syndrome's inheritance pattern is described as x-linked recessive. Genes known to be deleted are CHM and POU3F4, both located on the Xq21 locus.
