= Accessory deep peroneal nerve =

Neurological anomaly of the foot

- The accessory deep peroneal nerve is inherited in an autosomal dominant fashion.
- Specialty: Neurology, podiatry
- Diagnostic method: Surface electrodes, post death autopsy

The accessory deep peroneal nerve is an anomalous nerve in which the nerve splits off from the common peroneal nerve and sometimes innervates the extensor digitorum brevis muscle. By itself, the condition is harmless but in conjunction with other neurological and structural defects in the area, can make the condition more difficult. The anomaly is relatively common, estimated to occur in around 22-25% of people with equal distribution between women and men. It is inherited in an autosomal dominant fashion.

== Clinical significance ==
If the accessory deep peroneal nerve is damaged, it can cause inexplicable ankle pain. It can also cause more pain in cases of anterior tarsal tunnel syndrome and deep peroneal neuropathy.

== History ==
It was once believed that the extensor digitorum brevis muscle was only innervated by the deep peroneal nerve, as described in several German textbooks. However, with the use of surface electrodes and cadaver investigation, the secondary nerve was discovered.
