= Aniridia renal agenesis psychomotor retardation =

- Other names: Sommer-Rathbun-Battles syndrome

Aniridia ataxia renal agenesis psychomotor retardation is a rare genetic disorder characterized by missing irises of the eye, ataxia, psychomotor retardation and abnormal kidneys. It is detected via genetic test.
