= Anterior horn disease =

- Anterior horn(#1above) is affected in this condition
- Specialty: Neurology

Anterior horn disease is one of a number of medical disorders affecting the anterior horn of the spinal cord. Anterior horn diseases include spinal muscular atrophy, poliomyelitis and amyotrophic lateral sclerosis.
