= Fetal aortic stenosis =

- Specialty: Neonatology

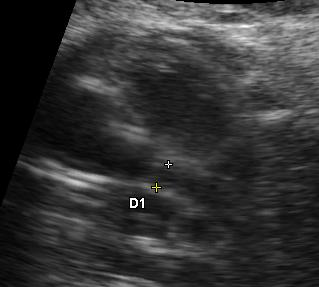
Aortic stenosis: Narrowed aorta 3mm (Fetus 26 weeks).

Fetal aortic stenosis is a disorder that occurs when the fetus’ aortic valve does not fully open during development. The aortic valve is a one way valve that is located between the left ventricle and the aorta, keeping blood from leaking back into the ventricle. It has three leaflets that separate when the ventricle contracts to allow blood to move from the ventricle to the aorta. These leaflets come together when the ventricle relaxes.

== Mechanism ==
Since the valve does not open properly in aortic stenosis, there is a decrease in the forward movement of blood into the aorta. Fetal aortic stenosis impairs left ventricular development, which can lead to hypoplastic left heart syndrome. If untreated, HLHS is lethal, as a result of the inability of the left heart to pump enough blood to sustain normal organ function. In fetal life, this is condition is manageable because the ductus arteriosus acts as a bypass, and supports the delivery of oxygenated blood to the systemic circulation. However, the ductus arteriosus closes during the first few days of life, resulting in systemic circulation failure in babies born with aortic valve stenosis.

== Diagnosis ==
Fetal aortic valve stenosis can be diagnosed by echocardiography before birth. The diagnostic features include a poorly contracting left ventricle, aortic valve thickening/restriction, a varying degree of left ventricular hypertrophy and abnormal Doppler flow characteristics in the left heart. There may be little or no detectable flow into or out of the left side of the heart.

There are two screening periods, one during the first trimester and the other during the second trimester. Fetal aortic stenosis is typically detected between 18 and 24 weeks gestation. This early detection is important because it allows for parents to be counseled in a timely and rational manner, allowing for discussion of prognosis and possible outcomes. Another reason for this crucial early detection is because it allows for postnatal management planning.

== Treatment ==
Intervention inutero may need to be done if there is concern that the aortic stenosis is severe enough to lead to the development of hypoplastic left heart syndrome. Management before birth is done by a fetal aortic valvuloplasty. In this procedure, fetal positioning is crucial. It is important that the left chest is located anteriorly, and that there are no limbs between the uterine wall and the apex of the left ventricle. The LV apex needs to be within 9 cm of the abdominal wall and the left ventricle outflow track has to be parallel to the intended cannula course in order for the wire to be blindly directed at the aortic valve. An 11.5 cm long, 19-gauge cannula and stylet needle passes through the mother's abdomen, uterine wall, and fetal chest wall into the left ventricle of the fetus. Then a 0.014 inch guide wire is passed across the stenosis aortic valve, where a balloon is inflated to stretch the aortic annulus.

Once born, critical or severe aortic stenosis is often treated through a less invasive catherization procedure knows as aortic valvuloplasty. Other options for newborns involve open heart surgery. Potential open heart surgeries may include aortic valve repair or the Ross procedure.

If the fetal aortic stenosis is critical it may lead to hypoplastic left heart syndrome. Hypoplastic Left Heart Syndrome (HLHS) it is treated with the Norwood procedure. This typically consists of three surgeries creating and removing shunts. The atrial septum is removed, the aortic arch is reconstructed to remove any hypoplasia, and then the main pulmonary artery is connected into this reconstructed arch, resulting in the right ventricle ejecting directly into systemic circulation. the result is the right ventricle pumping blood to both the body and to the lungs.

An alternative to the Norwood procedure is known as the hybrid procedure, was developed in 2008. In the hybrid procedure, bilateral pulmonary artery bands are positioned to limit pulmonary flow while, at the same time, placing a stent in the ductus arteriosus to hold it open. This maintains the connection between the aorta and the systemic circulation. A balloon atrial septostomy is also done. This ensures that there is enough of a connection between the two atria of the heart to provide open blood flow and mixing of oxygen rich and poor blood This procedure spares the baby from undergoing open heart surgery until they are older. They typically come back at 4–6 months of age when they are stronger for the open heart surgery.
