= Hereditary neurocutaneous angioma =

- Other names: Angioma hereditary neurocutaneous, Hemangiomatosis, disseminated, Hereditary neurocutaneous malformation spinal arterial, Venous malformations with cutaneous hemangiomas.
- Specialty: Medical genetics
- Usual onset: Birth
- Causes: Presumed genetic mutation
- Risk factors: Family history
- Frequency: rare
- Deaths: 3

Hereditary neurocutaneous angioma is a rare genetic disorder characterized by the appearance of angiomas on cutaneous and neurological areas of the body in multiple members of a single family.

== Presentation ==
Individuals with this condition typically have angiomatous lesions on the brain, spinal cord, (neuro) and skin (cutaneous). Of these angiomas, those which are present in the central nervous system tend to bleed more easily and often. These lesions typically vary in size, color and shape between people.

== Complications ==
Potential complications that people with this condition have a higher chance of suffering from are cerebral bleeding, arteriovenous malformation-associated seizures, paralysis, gastrointestinal bleeding, and hematuria. In rare cases, premature death might occur.

== Causes ==
No genetic cause for this condition has been identified, although it is known to be hereditary; most cases of hereditary neurocutaneous angioma reported in medical literature consisted of various affected members in multi-generational families.

== Diagnosis ==
A diagnosis can be made by examining family history, symptoms, MRIs, and cerebral angiographies.

== Treatment ==
Hemangiomas can be removed by surgical resection.

== Prevalence ==
According to OMIM, only 7 families around the world with hereditary neurocutaneous angioma have been described in medical literature.

== Cases ==
The following list comprises the list of most (if not all) cases of hereditary neurocutaneous angioma:

- 1964: Burke et al. describes 2 un-related American infants who had multiple small hemangiomatic lesions in various areas of the skin and the brain.
- 1976: Kaplan et al. describes a 3-generation Canadian family with hereditary neurocutaneous angioma. The proband was a 16-month-old infant girl who suffered from paraplegia as a result of an intraspinal AV malformation which was the consequence of cutaneomeningospinal angiomatosis. Family history examination found that cutaneous hemangiomas were quite common in her family, and they occurred in 3 generations of it. No instance of male-to-male transmission were observed in her family.
- 1979: Zaremba et al. describes 4 members of a 3-generation Polish family. One of these patients died at the age of 28 due to 'multiple dilated thin-walled vessels in the cerebral substance', said patient had a pink-colored hemangioma planum lesion of irregular shape located in the left shoulder, arm, and forearm which faded temporarily when it had pressure applied on it, the patient's younger brother developed a left hemiparesis aged 13 and died aged 19 due to complications from an attempted spinal angioma resection in the C6-T1 region. He had two angiomas, one in his left frontotemporal area and another one over his right mastoid process. The father of both of the brothers also developed left hemiparesis aged 58, alongside recurrent urinary and gastrointestinal hemorrhage. The presence of angiomas was noted on his chest and his left thigh. One of the daughters of the older brother (who later died aged 28 like her father) had 4 angiomas, 3 of which were present in her lumbosacral area, while the other one was present in her left palm.
- 1980: Foo et al. describes 7 affected members from a 3-generation American family. The proband was a 33-year-old man who had cervical anterior cord syndrome as a result of an arteriovenous malformation in his cervical endural space spontaneously bleeding. Family history examination found vascular malformations of the skin in 6 other members belonging to 3 generations of his family: his mother had 4 hemangiomas located in her back, face, neck, and right thigh removed, a maternal aunt had an hemangioma located in her left ankle removed when she was 20 years old, one of his brothers had an hemangioma located above his right ear removed at age 10 and one of his younger sisters had 2 angiomas removed at separate ages, one located in her right shoulder when she was 15 and the other located in her pelvis when she was 31, said sister went on to have 2 sons, of which one had an hemangioma located in his forehead removed when he was 2 and the other had an hemangioma located on the left side of his face removed when he was 3.
- 1988: Hurst and Baraitser describe 2 British families with hereditary neurocutaneous angioma. The first instance consisted of a father and son (2 members of a 2-generation family), the father had hemangiomas in his arm, nose, and trunk, while his son had an arteriovenous malformation in his temporal lobe. The second instance consisted of 5 affected members from a 4-generation family.

== See also ==
- Neurocutaneous syndrome
- Port-wine stain
