= Accessory pancreas =

Congenital disorder of digestive system

- Specialty: General surgery

Accessory pancreas is a rare condition in which small groups of pancreatic cells are separate from the pancreas. They may occur in the mesentery of the small intestine, the wall of the duodenum, the upper part of the jejunum, or more rarely, in the wall of the stomach, ileum, gallbladder or spleen. The condition was first described by Klob in 1859.

Accessory pancreas is a small cluster of pancreas cells detached from the pancreas and sometimes found in the wall of the stomach or intestines.

== Diagnosis ==
Pancreatic disorders are often accompanied by weakness and fatigue. The past Medical history may reveal previous disorders of the biliary tract or duodenum, abdominal trauma or surgery, and metabolic disorders such as diabetes mellitus. The medication history should be detailed and specifically include the use of thiazides, furosemide, estrogens, corticosteroids, sulfonamides, and opiates. Note a family history of pancreatic disorders. In the review of systems, obtain a complete description of any pain in the upper abdomen or epigastric area. Symptoms that may be important in relation to pancreatic disorders are pruritus, abdominal pain, dyspnea, nausea, and vomiting. The functional assessment includes data about the patient's dietary habits and use of alcohol.

Note any restlessness, flushing, or diaphoresis during the examination. Vital signs may disclose low-grade fever, tachypnea, tachycardia, and hypotension. Inspect the skin for jaundice. Assess the abdomen for distention, tenderness, discoloration, and diminished bowel sounds.

Tests and procedures used to diagnose pancreatic disorders include laboratory analyses of blood, urine, stool, and pancreatic fluid, and imaging studies. Specific blood studies used to assess pancreatic function include measurements of serum amylase, lipase, glucose, calcium, and triglyceride levels. Urine amylase and renal amylase clearance tests may also be ordered. Stool specimens may be analyzed for fat content. The secretin stimulation test measures the bicarbonate concentration of pancreatic fluid after secretin is given intravenously to stimulate the production of pancreatic fluid.

== Treatment ==
Treatment of accessory pancreas depends on the location and extent of the injured tissue. Surgery may be an option, or some physicians order prophylactic antibiotics.
