= ATR-16 syndrome =

- Other names: Alpha thalassemia-intellectual disability syndrome, deletion type, Alpha thalassemia-mental retardation syndrome
- Chromosome 16 is linked to this condition.

ATR-16 syndrome, also called alpha-thalassemia-intellectual disability syndrome, is a rare disease characterized by monosomy on part of chromosome 16.

== Signs and symptoms ==
ATR-16 syndrome affects the blood, development, and brain; symptoms vary based on the specific genes deleted on chromosome 16. Because it is so rare, it is difficult to determine the "core" symptoms of the disease. People with ATR-16 have alpha-thalassemia, a blood disorder where there is less normal hemoglobin in the blood than there should be, and the red blood cells are smaller than they should be (microcytic anemia). Affected children have various characteristic physical features, including clubfoot, "locked" little fingers, microcephaly (small head), hypertelorism (widely spaced eyes), broad, prominent nose bridge, downward-slanted palpebral fissures, small ears, retrognathia, and short neck. Children with ATR-16 syndrome also have mild to moderate intellectual disabilities, developmental delays/growth delays, and speech delays. Some children with ATR-16 have seizures, cryptorchidism (undescended testes), or hypospadias.

== Genetics ==
ATR-16 syndrome is caused by a deletion of part of chromosome 16, from p13.3 (a band on the short end of the chromosome) to the end of the chromosome. These can either be due to a balanced translocation or a de novo deletion. The genes affected include hemoglobin, alpha 1 (HBA1) and hemoglobin, alpha 2 (HBA2).

== Diagnosis ==
Though only definitively diagnosable by genetic sequence testing, including a G band analysis, ATR-16 syndrome may be diagnosed from its constellation of symptoms. It must be distinguished from ATR-X syndrome, a very similar disease caused by a mutation on the X chromosome, and cases of alpha-thalassemia that co-occur with intellectual disabilities with no underlying genetic relationship.

== Treatment ==
Treatments for ATR-16 syndrome depend on the symptoms experienced by any individual. Alpha thalassemia is usually self-limiting, but in some cases may require a blood transfusion or chelating treatment.

== Epidemiology ==
The incidence rate of ATR-16 syndrome is not easy to estimate and it is thought to be underdiagnosed. Scientists have described more than 20 cases as of 2013.
