= Rosenthal–Kloepfer syndrome =

- Other names: Familial pachydermoperiostosis
- Specialty: Dermatology

Rosenthal–Kloepfer syndrome is a cutaneous condition characterized by abnormal growth of bone and skin, coupled with clouding of the cornea. It was described in 1962. Another name for the condition is acromegaly-cutis verticis gyrata-corneal leukoma syndrome.

== Signs and symptoms ==
Presenting symptoms include unilateral or bilateral opacification of the cornea, which progressively involves the whole structure. Visual disturbance secondary to corneal opacification is often the presenting symptom. Other symptoms include furrowing of the scalp, enlargement of the bony portion of the eyebrows, and disproportionately large hands.

== Cause ==
No gene mutation as has been associated with this disorder. Inheritance follows an autosomal dominant pattern.

== Diagnosis ==
Radiographic imaging reveals thickening of bones, especially of the skull, and widening of the bones in the fingers.

== See also ==
- Amniotic band syndrome
- List of cutaneous conditions
