= Arrhinia =

Partial or complete absence of the nose at birth

- Other names: Nasal agenesis
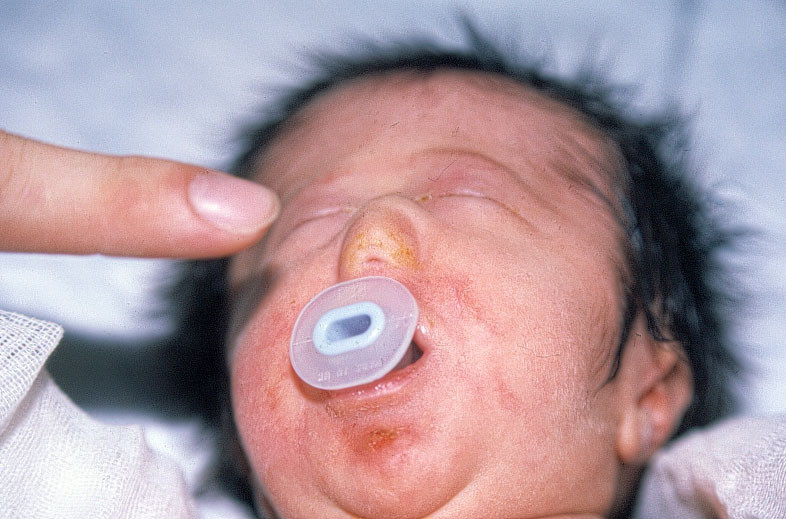
- Neonate with partial arrhinia.
- Pronunciation: /əˈrɪniə/ or /əˈraɪniə/
- Specialty: Medical genetics
- Frequency: 0.0001%

Arrhinia (alternatively spelled "arhinia") is the congenital partial or complete absence of the nose at birth. It is an extremely rare condition, with few reported cases in the history of modern medicine. It is generally classified as a craniofacial abnormality.

The cause of arrhinia is not known. One study of the literature found that all cases had presented a normal antenatal history.

== Conditions ==
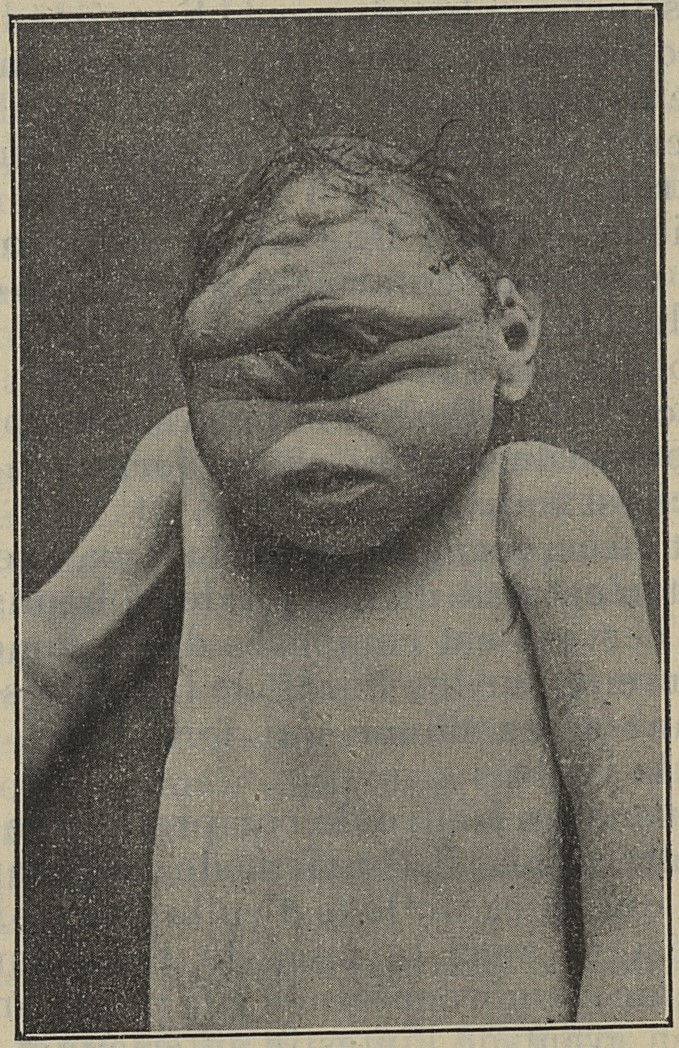
Infant with full Arrhinia in Cyclopia (c.1909)

Arrhinia is associated with the following conditions and syndromes:

- Arrhinia with choanal atresia and microphthalmia syndrome (Bosma arhinia microphthalmia syndrome)
- Holoprosencephaly 1
- Holoprosencephaly 13, X-linked
- Holoprosencephaly-radial heart renal anomalies syndrome

== History ==
The phenomenon of congenital arrhinia, which refers to the complete absence of the nose from birth, was initially documented in French literature during the 1800s. Over time, a few additional cases of individuals born with congenital arrhinia, some with accompanying eye defects and others without, were reported in medical literature from the early to mid-1900s.

Dr. James Bosma, a pediatrician and researcher associated with the National Institute of Dental Health, made a significant observation while studying these patients. He noted that individuals with congenital arrhinia often exhibited problems related to genital and reproductive hormones. In his comprehensive report in 1981, Dr. Bosma described two unrelated males initially reported by plastic surgeon Dr. George Gifford et al. in 1972. These patients presented with congenital arrhinia, eye defects, and genital abnormalities, such as a small penis and undescended testes at birth, with no spontaneous sexual maturation.

Every individual with congenital arrhinia appears to be the first and only one affected within their respective families. Nonetheless, there have been a few reports of multiple cases within the same family, with one of the earliest examples being described by Klaus Ruprecht and Frank Majewski in 1978. They reported on two German sisters who exhibited congenital arrhinia along with eye defects.

== Treatment ==
Treatment focuses on identifying the nature of the anomalies through various imaging methods, including MRI and CAT scan, and surgical correction to the extent possible.

In severe cases, temporary airway devices, such as tracheostomy tubes, may be utilized to facilitate breathing until surgical intervention is deemed appropriate.

Surgical procedures should only be carried out by a team of medical experts, including otolaryngologists, plastic surgeons, and prosthodontists. The arrhinia reconstruction process primarily involves two main parts: the reconstruction of the nasal cavity and the reconstruction of the external nose.

There are two methods for reconstructing the nasal cavity. In the first method, two separate nasal cavities are created using a dental drill, and then silicone tubes are used to keep the newly formed nasal passages open. The second method involves a Le Fort II maxillary osteotomy, which involves making an incision through the maxillozygomatic consoles and towards the medial end of the inferior orbital rim. A horizontal arm connects the two sides, and then the maxilla is carefully fractured, creating a wide median nasal cavity that extends to the upper portion of the rhinopharynx. If the maxillary height is sufficient, the patient may only need a Le-Fort II osteotomy. However, if it is not high enough, the patient will require a Le-Fort II osteotomy first, followed by an extension along the maxillary bone. External distraction devices may also be used to provide additional facial height and sufficient midfacial vertical length for nasal reconstruction. Lengthening the maxilla has two advantages: it provides enough height for nasal cavity reconstruction and achieves suitable aesthetic proportions.

Surgical treatment methods for arrhinia can involve either staged reconstruction or simultaneous reconstruction of the nasal passage and the external nose. Staged reconstruction, where the procedures are performed in separate stages, is more commonly reported than simultaneous reconstruction.
