= Anonychia =

Medical condition

- Specialty: Dermatology

Anonychia is the failure to form fingernails or toenails.

It is an anomaly which may be the result of a congenital ectodermal defect, ichthyosis, severe infection, severe allergic contact dermatitis, self-inflicted trauma, Raynaud phenomenon, lichen planus, epidermolysis bullosa, or severe exfoliative diseases.

== Cause ==
This is rare and is usually due to mutations in the R-spondin 4 (RSPO4) gene which is located on the short arm of chromosome 20 (20p13).

== See also ==
- List of cutaneous conditions
