= Aplasia cutis congenita =

Absence of skin at birth

- Aplasia cutis congenital is autosomal dominant
- Specialty: Dermatology, medical genetics
- Risk factors: Vanishing twin (Type V)

Aplasia cutis congenita (ACC) is a rare disorder characterized by congenital absence of skin. Ilona J. Frieden classified ACC in 1986 into 9 groups on the basis of location of the lesions and associated congenital anomalies. The scalp is the most commonly involved area with lesser involvement of trunk and extremities. Frieden classified ACC with fetus papyraceus as type 5. This type presents as truncal ACC with symmetrical absence of skin in stellate or butterfly pattern with or without involvement of proximal limbs. It is the most common congenital cicatricial alopecia, and is a congenital focal absence of epidermis with or without evidence of other layers of the skin.

The exact etiology of ACC is still unclear but intrauterine infection by varicella or herpes virus, drugs such as methimazole, misoprostol, valproate, cocaine, marijuana etc., fetus papyraceus, feto-fetal transfusion, vascular coagulation defects, amniotic membrane adherence, abnormal elastic fiber biomechanical forces and trauma are implicated. It can be associated with Johanson–Blizzard syndrome, Adams–Oliver syndrome, trisomy 13, and Wolf–Hirschhorn syndrome. It can also be seen with exposure to methimazole and carbimazole in utero. This dermatological manifestation has been linked to Peptidase D haploinsufficiency and a deletion in Chromosome 19.

== Genetics ==
This condition has been linked to mutations in the ribosomal GTPase BMS1 gene.

== Treatment ==
Skin grafting is a solution to fix aplasia cutis congenita.

== See also ==
- List of cutaneous conditions
- Aplasia cutis-myopia syndrome
