= List of diseases (L) =

This is a list of diseases starting with the letter "L".

== La ==
=== Lab–Lam ===
- Labrador lung
- Labyrinthitis
- Lachiewicz–Sibley syndrome
- Lacrimo-auriculo-dento-digital syndrome
- Lactate dehydrogenase deficiency type A
- Lactate dehydrogenase deficiency type B
- Lactate dehydrogenase deficiency type C
- Lactate dehydrogenase deficiency
- Lactic acidosis congenital infantile
- Lactose intolerance
- Ladda–Zonana–Ramer syndrome
- Lafora disease
- Lagophthalmia cleft lip palate
- Lambdoid synostosis familial
- Lambert syndrome
- Lambert–Eaton myasthenic syndrome (Lambert–Eaton paraneoplastic cerebellar degeneration)
- Lambert–Eaton syndrome
- Lamellar ichthyosis
- Lamellar recessive ichthyosis

=== Lan–Lap ===
- Landau–Kleffner syndrome
- Landouzy–Dejerine muscular dystrophy
- Landy–Donnai syndrome
- Langdon Down
- Langer–Nishino–Yamaguchi syndrome
- Langer–Giedion syndrome
- Langerhans cell granulomatosis
- Langerhans cell histiocytosis
- Laparoschisis
- Laplane–Fontaine–Lagardere syndrome

=== Lar–Lat ===
- Large B-cell diffuse lymphoma
- Laron-type dwarfism
- Larsen-like osseous dysplasia dwarfism
- Larsen-like syndrome lethal type
- Larsen syndrome craniosynostosis
- Larsen syndrome, dominant type
- Larsen syndrome, recessive type
- Larsen syndrome
- Laryngeal abductor paralysis mental retardation
- Laryngeal carcinoma
- Laryngeal cleft
- Laryngeal neoplasm
- Laryngeal papillomatosis
- Laryngeal web congenital heart disease short stature
- Laryngitis
- Laryngocele
- Laryngomalacia dominant congenital
- Laryngomalacia
- Larynx atresia
- Lassa fever
- Lassueur–Graham–Little syndrome
- Late onset dominant cone dystrophy
- Lateral body wall defect
- Laterality defects dominant
- Lattice corneal dystrophy type 2

=== Lau–Lax ===
- Launois–Bensaude adenolipomatosis
- Laurence–Prosser–Rocker syndrome
- Laurence–Moon–Bardet–Biedl syndrome
- Laurin–Sandrow syndrome
- Laxova–Brown–Hogan syndrome

== Lb–Lc ==
- LBWC - amniotic bands
- LBWD syndrome
- LCHAD deficiency

== Le ==
=== Lea–Leh ===
- Lead poisoning
- Leao Ribeiro Da Silva syndrome
- Learman syndrome
- Leber military aneurysm
- Leber optic atrophy
- Leber's disease
- Lecithin cholesterol acyltransferase deficiency
- Ledderhose disease
- Lee–Root–Fenske syndrome
- Left ventricle-aorta tunnel
- Left ventricular hypertrophy
- Leg absence deformity cataract
- Legg–Calvé–Perthes syndrome
- Legionellosis (Legionnaires' disease)
- Lehman syndrome

=== Lei–Ler ===
- Leichtman–Wood–Rohn syndrome
- Leifer–Lai–Buyse syndrome
- Leigh disease
- Leigh syndrome, French Canadian type
- Leiner disease
- Leiomyoma
- Leiomyomatosis familial
- Leiomyomatosis of oesophagus cataract hematuria
- Leiomyosarcoma
- Leipala–Kaitila syndrome
- Leishmaniasis
- Leisti–Hollister–Rimoin syndrome
- Lemierre's syndrome
- Lennox–Gastaut syndrome
- Lentiginosis in context of NF
- Lenz–Majewski hyperostotic dwarfism
- Lenz microphthalmia syndrome
- Leprechaunism
- Leprosy
- Leptomeningeal capillary - venous angiomatosis
- Leptospirosis
- Leri pleonosteosis
- Léri–Weill dyschondrosteosis

=== Les–Let ===
- Lesch–Nyhan syndrome
- Lethal chondrodysplasia Moerman type
- Lethal chondrodysplasia Seller type
- Lethal congenital contracture syndrome
- Letterer–Siwe disease

=== Leu–Lev ===
- Leucinosis
- Leukemia subleukemic
- Leukemia, B-Cell, chronic
- Leukemia, Myeloid
- Leukemia, T-Cell, chronic
- Leukemia
- Leukocyte adhesion deficiency syndrome
- Leukocyte adhesion deficiency type 2
- Leukocytoclastic angiitis
- Leukodystrophy reunion type
- Leukodystrophy, globoid cell
- Leukodystrophy, metachromatic
- Leukodystrophy, pseudometachromatic
- Leukodystrophy, Sudanophilic
- Leukodystrophy
- Leukoencephalopathy palmoplantar keratoderma
- Leukomalacia
- Leukomelanoderma mental retardation hypotrichosis
- Leukoplakia
- Levator syndrome
- Levic–Stefanovic–Nikolic syndrome
- Levine–Crichley syndrome

=== Lew–Ley ===
- Lewandowski–Kikolich syndrome
- Lewis–Pashayan syndrome
- Leydig cells hypoplasia

== Lg–Lh ==
- LGCR
- LGS
- Lhermitte–Duclos disease

== Li ==
=== Lic–Lin ===
- Lichen myxedematosus
- Lichen planus follicularis
- Lichen planus
- Lichen sclerosus et atrophicus
- Lichen spinulosus
- Lichstenstein syndrome
- Lida–Kannari syndrome
- Liddle syndrome
- Li–Fraumeni syndrome
- Light chain disease
- Ligyrophobia
- Limb deficiencies distal micrognathia
- Limb dystonia
- Limb reduction defect
- Limb scalp and skull defects
- Limb transversal defect cardiac anomaly
- Limb-body wall complex
- Limb-girdle muscular dystrophy
- Lindsay–Burn syndrome
- Lindstrom syndrome
- Linear hamartoma syndrome
- Linear nevus syndrome

=== Lip–Lis ===
- Lip lit syndrome
- Lipedema
- Lipid storage myopathy
- Lipidosis with triglyceride storage disease
- Lipoamide dehydrogenase deficiency
- Lipodystrophy Rieger anomaly diabetes
- Lipodystrophy
- Lipogranulomatosis
- Lipoid congenital adrenal hyperplasia
- Lipoid proteinosis of Urbach and Wiethe
- Lipomatosis central non-encapsulated
- Lipomatosis familial benign cervical
- Lipomucopolysaccharidosis
- Lipoprotein disorder
- Liposarcoma
- Lisker–Garcia–Ramos syndrome
- Lison–Kornbrut–Feinstein syndrome
- Lissencephaly immunodeficiency
- Lissencephaly syndrome type 1
- Lissencephaly syndrome type 2
- Lissencephaly, isolated
- Lissencephaly
- Listeria infection
- Listeriosis

=== Lit–Liv ===
- Livedoid dermatitis
- Liver cirrhosis
- Liver disease
- Liver neoplasms (liver cancer)

== Lo ==
=== Lob–Lou ===
- Lobar atrophy of brain
- Lobster hand
- Lobstein disease
- Localized epiphyseal dysplasia
- Locked-in syndrome
- Lockwood–Feingold syndrome
- Loffredo–Cennamo–Cecio syndrome
- Logic syndrome
- Loiasis
- Loin pain hematuria syndrome
- Long COVID
- Long QT Syndrome
  - Long QT syndrome type 1
  - Long QT syndrome type 2
  - Long QT syndrome type 3
- Loose anagen hair syndrome
- Loose anagen syndrome
- Lopes–Gorlin syndrome
- Lopes–Marques de Faria syndrome
- Lopez–Hernandez syndrome
- Lou Gehrig's disease
- Louis–Bar syndrome

=== Low ===
- Low birth weight dwarfism dysgammaglobulinemia
- Lowe–Kohn–Cohen syndrome
- Lowe oculocerebrorenal syndrome
- Lowe syndrome
- Lower limb anomaly ureteral obstruction
- Lower limb deficiency hypospadias
- Lower mesodermal defects
- Lowry–MacLean syndrome
- Lowry syndrome
- Lowry–Wood syndrome
- Lowry–Yong syndrome

== Ls–Lt ==
- LSA
- L-transposition and ccTGA

== Lu ==
- Lubani Al Saleh Teebi syndrome
- Lubinsky syndrome
- Lucey–Driscoll syndrome
- Lucky–Gelehrter syndrome
- Ludomania
- Lúes Congénita
- Lujan–Fryns syndrome
- Lumbar malsegmentation short stature
- Lumbar spinal stenosis
- Lundberg syndrome
- Lung agenesis heart defect thumb anomalies
- Lung cancer
- Lung herniation congenital defect of sternem
- Lung neoplasm
- Lupus anticoagulant, familial
- Lupus erythematosus
- Lurie–Kletsky syndrome
- Luteinizing hormone releasing hormone, deficiency of with ataxia
- Lutz–Richner–Landolt syndrome
- Lutz–Lewandowsky epidermodysplasia verruciformis

== Ly ==
=== Lye–Lyg ===
- Lyell's syndrome
- Lygophobia

=== Lym ===
==== Lyme ====
- Lyme disease

==== Lymp ====
===== Lymph =====
- Lymph node neoplasm

====== Lympha–Lymphe ======
- Lymphadenopathy, angioimmunoblastic with dysproteinemia
- Lymphangiectasies lymphoedema type Hennekam type
- Lymphangiectasis
- Lymphangioleiomyomatosis
- Lymphangiomatosis, pulmonary
- Lymphangiomyomatosis
- Lymphatic filariasis
- Lymphatic neoplasm
- Lymphedema distichiasis
- Lymphedema hereditary type 1
- Lymphedema hereditary type 2
- Lymphedema ptosis
- Lymphedema, congenital
- Lymphedema
- Lymphedema–distichiasis syndrome

====== Lympho ======
- Lymphoblastic lymphoma
- Lymphocytes reduced or absent
- Lymphocytic colitis
- Lymphocytic infiltrate of Jessner
- Lymphocytic vasculitis
- Lymphoid hamartoma
- Lymphoma, AIDS-related
- Lymphoma, gastric non-Hodgkin's type
- Lymphoma, large-cell, immunoblastic
- Lymphoma, large-cell
- Lymphoma, small cleaved-cell, diffuse
- Lymphoma, small cleaved-cell, follicular
- Lymphoma
- Lymphomatoid granulomatosis
- Lymphomatoid Papulosis (LyP)
- Lymphomatous thyroiditis
- Lymphosarcoma

=== Lyn–Lys ===
- Lynch–Lee–Murday syndrome
- Lynch–Bushby syndrome
- Lyngstadaas syndrome
- LyP (lymphomatoid papulosis)
- Lysine alpha-ketoglutarate reductase deficiency
- Lysinuric protein intolerance
- Lysosomal alpha-D-mannosidase deficiency
- Lysosomal beta-mannosidase deficiency
- Lysosomal glycogen storage disease with normal acid maltase activity
- Lysosomal storage disease
