= Stewart–Treves syndrome =

- Other names: Cutaneous angiosarcoma
- Complications: recurrent episodes of erysipelas, deep venous thromboses in areas of chronic lymphedema, recurrent infections, and malignancies.
- Frequency: Approximately 400 cases of Stewart-Treves syndrome have been reported.

Stewart–Treves syndrome is a lymphangiosarcoma, a rare disorder marked by the presence of an angiosarcoma (a malignant tumor of blood or lymph vessels) in a person with chronic (long-term) lymphedema. Although it most commonly refers to malignancies associated with chronic lymphedema resulting from mastectomy and/or radiotherapy for breast cancer, it may also describe lymphangiosarcomas that result from congenital and other causes of chronic secondary lymphedema. Lymphangiosarcoma arising from cancer-related lymphedema has become much less common with better surgical techniques, radiation therapy, and conservative treatment. The prognosis, even with wide surgical excision and subsequent radiotherapy, is poor.

== Signs and symptoms ==
Lymphangiosarcoma usually occurs many years following a mastectomy, usually between 5 and 15 years.

Cutaneous angiosarcoma can begin as a "spreading bruise" or a raised purple-red papule before progressing to tissue infiltration, edema, tumor fungation, ulceration, and even hemorrhage as tumor size increases. The second most frequent location is in a lymphedematous upper extremity secondary to radical mastectomy. This is known as the "Stewart Treves tumor". Lesions range in size from 3 to 6 cm on average, although untreated angiosarcomas can grow to 20 cm or more.

Severe persistent edema of an upper extremity is common in Stewart-Treves syndrome patients and is often the first sign. In patients who underwent a radical mastectomy, edema initially appears on the arm of the side operated on.

The edematous area spreads from the arm to the forearm and the dorsal side of the hand and fingers. Pain is initially absent, though skin distention may cause local discomfort. Recurrent erysipelas may occur in sites with long-standing chronic edema.

Stewart-Treves syndrome lesions often present as several reddish blue macules or nodules that may develop polypoid. Small satellite areas can form around these areas and become confluent, producing a growing lesion. A bullous component is occasionally visible.

As the angiosarcoma grows and spreads, the overlying atrophic epidermis may ulcerate, resulting in repeated episodes of bleeding and infection. Advanced cutaneous tumors may exhibit necrosis.

== Cause ==
Angiosarcoma is found to occur in 0.07% to 0.45% of people who survive at least 5 years after a radical mastectomy. Although the majority of Stewart-Treves syndrome-related angiosarcomas are caused by post-mastectomy lymphedema, angiosarcoma development has been linked to persistent lymphedema of any origin. The precise mechanism underlying persistent lymphedema and angiosarcoma remains unknown. Stewart and Treves proposed that a systemic carcinogenic component was to blame for this process. It has also been proposed that lymphedematous areas undergo neoplastic change with the establishment of collateral circulation. Other hypotheses include a malignant transformation caused by lymphatic drainage blockage and decreased antigen presentation, resulting in cancer evading immune monitoring at an "immunologically privileged site."

Although this syndrome was first described in patients following a radical mastectomy, it can also occur in the context of congenital or hereditary lymphatic malformations such as Turner syndrome, Noonan syndrome, Milroy disease, lymphedema praecox, and lymphedema tarda. Chronic infections, chronic venous stasis, morbid obesity, malignant obstruction, and surgical procedures that disrupt lymphatic flow.

== Diagnosis ==
Despite the fact that Stewart-Treves syndrome is also known as lymphangiosarcoma, ultrastructural and immunohistologic investigations demonstrate that this cancer is caused by blood arteries rather than lymphatic vessels. The immunohistologic and ultrastructural results listed below can be utilized to confirm that the tumor is derived from blood vessels:

- Antibodies against factor VIII-related antigen are endothelial cell markers.
- CD34 antigen is a vascular endothelial cell marker that does not react with lymphatic endothelial cells.
- Antikeratin antibodies reveal no evidence of keratin in this cancer, confirming that the tumor cells are not epithelial in origin.
- Positive staining for laminin, CD31, collagen IV, and vimentin can help identify angiosarcomas.

Magnetic resonance imaging is recommended to assess the local extent of angiosarcomas. In patients with chronic lymphedema, nodules identified by MRI within the lymphedema should be assessed for Stewart-Treves syndrome. In patients with chronic lymphedema, fluorodeoxyglucose (FDG) PET/CT scanning may show tumor spread, including metastases, and detect probable malignant change.

== Treatment ==
The treatment of choice is a large resection or amputation of the affected limb. Radiation therapy can precede or follow surgical treatment. Tumors that have advanced locally or have metastasized can be treated with mono or polychemotherapy, systemically or locally. However, chemotherapy and radiation therapy have not been shown to improve survivorship significantly. In cases of upper limbs, forequarter amputation (disarticulation of upperlimb along with clavicle and scapula) is preferred.

== Prognosis ==
Early detection is key. Prognosis is generally poor, and the 5 year survival rate of patients with lymphangiosarcoma is less than 5%.

== Incidence ==
In the 1960s, the incidence five years after a radical mastectomy varied from 0.07% to 0.45%. Today, it occurs in 0.03% of patients surviving 10 or more years after radical mastectomy.

== History ==
Stewart-Treves syndrome was first documented in 1948, when Drs. Fred Stewart and Norman Treves reported a case series detailing six patients with lymphangiosarcoma who had chronic lymphedema following a mastectomy.

== See also ==
- Angiosarcoma
- List of cutaneous conditions
- Lymphangiosarcoma
- Lymphedema
- Postcardiotomy syndrome
