= Primary lymphedema =

Primary lymphedema is a form of lymphedema which is not directly attributable to another medical condition.

It can be divided into three forms, depending upon age of onset: congenital lymphedema, lymphedema praecox, and lymphedema tarda. Congenital lymphedema presents at birth. Lymphedema praecox presents from ages 1 to 35. This type of lymphedema accounts for 77–94% of all cases of primary lymphedema. Lymphedema tarda presents after age 35. This type of lymphedema usually develops as a result of a developmental abnormality being precipitated by some insult such as trauma, illness, or physical immobility. Compared to secondary lymphedema, primary lymphedema is more likely to involve the face, conjunctiva, and genitalia in association with any limbs involved.

It can be familial.
