= Alexander von Winiwarter =

Austrian-Belgian surgeon (1848–1917)

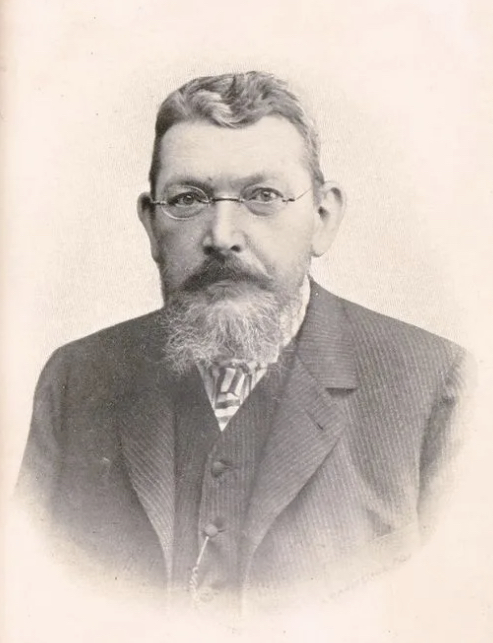
- Born: 22 April 1848
- Died: 31 October 1917 (aged 69)
- Occupation: surgeon

Alexander von Winiwarter (22 April 1848 – 31 October 1917) was an Austrian-Belgian surgeon who was a native of Vienna. He was the brother of physician Felix von Winiwarter (1852-1931).

Alexander Winiwarter obtained his medical doctorate in 1870 at the University of Vienna, and worked as a surgical assistant at the Vienna University Clinic under Theodor Billroth, a pioneer in the field of modern surgical practices. Later, he became head of the surgical department at the Kronprinz-Rudolf-Kinderspitals (Crown Prince Rudolf Children's Hospital), and in 1878 relocated to Belgium, where he became a professor of surgery at the University of Liège. Subsequently, he acquired Belgian citizenship.

In the latter part of the 19th century, Winiwarter introduced specialized massage and compression procedures to treat lymphedema, a disease that causes swollen arms and legs due to fluid retention in the lymphatic system. In 1932, Danish physiotherapist Emil Vodder refined and improved Winiwarter's technique to treat lymphedema. Vodder's treatment was to become known as manual lymphatic drainage.

== Selected writings ==
- Untersuchungen über die Gehörschnecke der Säugethiere (Studies on the cochlea in mammals), 1870.
- Zur pathologischen Anatomie der Leber (On the pathological anatomy of the liver), 1872.
- Das maligne Lymphom und das Lymphosarkom (Malignant lymphoma and lymphosarcoma) in Langenbeck's Archive, 1874.
- Beiträge zur Statistik der Carcinome (Contributions involving statistics of carcinoma), 1878.
- Zur Chirurgie der Gallenwege (On the surgery of bile ducts), Commemorative publication in honor of Billroth, 1892.
- Die chirurgischen Krankheiten der Haut und des Unterhautzellgewebes (Surgical diseases of the skin and subcutaneous tissue), 1893.
- Die Lehre von den chirurgischen Operationen und den chirurgischen Verbänden, 1895
