= Winiwarter =

Winiwarter is a German surname. Notable people with the surname include:

- Alexander von Winiwarter (1848-1917), Austrian-Belgian surgeon
- Felix Winiwarter (1930-2018), Austrian chess master
- Felix von Winiwarter (1852-1931), Austrian physician
- Verena Winiwarter (born 1961), Austrian environmental historian
