= Meige disease =

- Other names: Meige lymphedema, Late-onset lymphedema, Lymphedema hereditary type 2,

Meige disease, or Meige lymphedema is a genetic disorder in which lymphedema later develops. Meige disease is a primary lymphedema that is not caused by another condition; secondary lymphedema is a typical consequence of a mastectomy.

Another primary lymphedema is Milroy disease in which the lymphedema is present at birth. Lymphedema tarda occurs after the age of 35.

Meige disease has its onset around the time of puberty. It is an autosomal dominant disease. It has been linked to a mutations in the ‘forkhead’ family transcription factor (FOXC2) gene located on the long arm of chromosome 16 (16q24.3). It is the most common form of primary lymphedema, and about 2000 cases have been identified. Meige disease usually causes lymphedema of the legs, however, other areas of the body may be affected, including the arms, face and larynx.

== See also ==
- Aagenaes syndrome
- List of cutaneous conditions
- Lymphedema praecox
