= Postinflammatory lymphedema =

- Specialty: Dermatology

Postinflammatory lymphedema is a condition characterized by swelling of the soft tissues in which an excessive amount of lymph has accumulated, and is caused by repeated bacterial infections.

== See also ==
- Lymphedema
- Skin lesion
