= Factitial lymphedema =

- Other names: Hysterical edema
- Specialty: Dermatology

Factitial lymphedema, also known as hysterical edema, is a skin condition produced by wrapping an elastic bandage, cord, or shirt around an extremity, or holding the extremity in a position below the hear without moving it.

== See also ==
- Lymphedema
- Skin lesion
