= Lymphotherapy =

Therapy of the lymphatic system

Lymphotherapy (lymphatic physiotherapy) is a method by which pressure applied on specific lymph nodes alters lymphatic response. Proponents state it can be used for lymphedema and breast cancer.

== History ==
Lymphotherapy was first suggested in 1918 by Dr. S. Artault de Vevey in the Paris Therapeutic Society as a treatment for infectious diseases, though it had many fans as well as opponents. This treatment was popular in Italy in the 1960s and 1970s. Currently, lymphotherapy practice has been documented in complementary and alternative medicine.

== Effects ==
Complete decongestive lymphatic physiotherapy demands substantial time and effort from patients to maintain the benefits; treatments are not always well-accepted, and patients may suffer from a deterioration in quality of life or develop enhanced anxiety. Sudden loss of bowel control was reported, especially with lymphatic physiotherapy applied on the lymph nodes in the lower back.

== See also ==
- Manual lymphatic drainage
