= Bleil =

Bleil or BLEIL may refer to:

- Bilateral lower extremity inflammatory lymphedema (BLEIL), clinical entity
- Bill Bleil (born 1959), American college football coach
- Fred Bleil (1949–2011), American college football coach
