= Aagenaes syndrome =

- Other names: Aagenæs syndrome, Cholestasis-lymphedema syndrome
- Aagenaes syndrome is inherited in an autosomal recessive manner

Aagenaes syndrome is a syndrome characterised by congenital hypoplasia of lymph vessels, which causes lymphedema of the legs and recurrent cholestasis in infancy, and slow progress to hepatic cirrhosis and giant cell hepatitis with fibrosis of the portal tracts.

The genetic cause is due to point mutation (c.-98G>T) in the 5’-untranslated region of Unc-45 myosin chaperone A (UNC45A) and it is autosomal recessively inherited and the gene is located to chromosome 15q^{1,2}. The mutation leads to a loss of function of the protein, which in turn seem to lead to mislocalization of the hepatobiliary transport proteins BSEP (bile salt export pump) and MRP2 (multidrug resistance-associated protein 2).

A common feature of the condition is a generalised lymphoedema from birth or childhood caused by hypoplasia of the lymphatic vessels in origin^{1}. Approximately one hundred people with this disease are known. The condition is particularly frequent in southern Norway, where more than half the cases are reported, but it is found in patients in other parts of Europe and the United States. It is named after Øystein Aagenæs, a Norwegian paediatrician. It is also called cholestasis-lymphedema syndrome (CLS).

The first case of cholestasis usually improves spontaneously during preschool and early school age and returns at various intervals of two to six months. The severity of the disease varies in these patients, with some even experiencing complete liver failure. In these cases, liver transplantation is necessary. Untreated cholestasis is accompanied by jaundice, itching, malabsorption of fat and fat-soluble vitamins. This can lead to skeletal abnormalities and a higher susceptibility to bleeding. In early childhood and adolescence, lymphedema most often develops in all patients' lower limbs, but the upper limbs or chest are no exception. Untreated lymphedema can cause chronic tissue damage.

== Biochemical analysis ==
A biochemical analysis revealed a significant increase of bilirubin concentration in patients in the first months of life, with a later decrease. Around the age of 3 or 4, the value was optimized to normal limits.

In patients aged 10–20 years, serum concentrations of bilirubin, bile acids and transaminases (alanine aminotransferase, aspartate aminotransferase) reached normal or almost optimal values.

Patients without observed liver cirrhosis compared to the control group had elevated levels of ALP (alkaline phosphatase) and GGT (gamma-glutamyl transferase). There was no significant difference in serum bile acid concentrations between patients and control group. However, test patients had lower values for total protein, CRP, albumin and creatinine. Moreover, the value for fibrinogen was higher in patients with Aagenaes syndrome.

There was only a slight increase in mean cell hemoglobin (MCH) in terms of erythrocyte, leukocyte and platelet counts. Serum albumin concentrations decreased with age, but not in the control group.

== Treatment ==
Although no cure for this disease has been found, improvements in the course of the disease have been significantly seen after the administration of nutritional and vitamin supplements, especially in children. It is stated that if there is no remission by about 12 to 18 months of childhood, liver transplantation is necessary at a later age.

Neonatal cholestasis lasted no more than one year in some patients or lasted until the age of 6/7 years in some cases. In recent decades, cholestatic episodes have lasted a shorter time than before 1970. There has also been a decline in rickets, growth retardation, and neuropathy over time. The reasons for this are improved nutritional habits, vitamin and cholestyramine supplementation. Nevertheless, it is not yet possible to prevent serious liver disease.

== History ==
The first reported cases of Aagenaes syndrome were described in a study in 1968 from the southwest of Norway. Four out of five children born before 1939 died of bleeding in the first weeks of life. Vitamin K was introduced this year, after the birth of another four children after 1939. When these children received one dose of this vitamin, three of them died at the age of 5–9 months. The confirmed cause of death in one or two children in this group was bleeding. The remaining seven children, born in 1935 and in 1942–1966, who were part of a study published in 1968, were alive at the time.

== See also ==
- Lymphedema-distichiasis syndrome
- Lymphedema praecox
- Blueberry muffin baby
