= Fanny Mills =

Woman with Milroy's disease

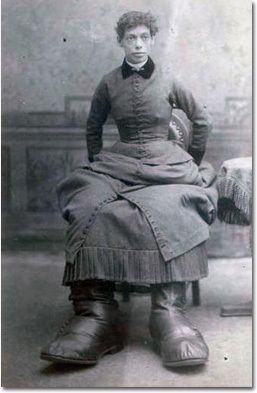
- Born: Fanny Mills; August 30, 1860; Sussex, England
- Died: May 3, 1899 (aged 38); Perkins, Erie, Ohio
- Resting place: Oakland Cemetery in Sandusky, Erie County, Ohio
- Other names: Fannie Mills Brown; Ohio Big Foot Girl
- Years active: 1885-1892
- Known for: Physical deformity due to Milroy's disease

Fanny Mills (August 30, 1860 – May 3, 1899), known under the stage name as the "Ohio Big Foot Girl", was a British-American woman who achieved fame as an entertainment attraction in dime museums throughout the 1880s. Mills suffered from the rare disease called Milroy's disease that caused her lower limbs to grow to enormous size.

== Early life and family ==
Fannie (née) Mills was born in Sussex, England to George and Sarah (née Ansel) Mills on August 30, 1860; although some sources state 1859. It was noted, however, in the 1861 census of England that Mills was "eight and one half months" old; having been born in the registration district of Thakeham in Sussex. The family immigrated to Sandusky, Ohio. Although her siblings were born without defect, Mills began to display symptoms associated with Milroy's disease at an early age. On June 5, 1880, the US census recorded Mills' first name as "Fanny"; with a note next to the listing for Mills, age 14, that read “deformed feet.” It was rumored that the family attributed her affliction to a story they told about how Mills' father forced her mother to wash the swelled leg of a horse (foal) while she was pregnant.

As a child, it was noted that Mills did not "walk" as much as "wobble". On account of this disability, she was recognized throughout the township and her appearance began to gain attention from the press. Various showmen offered the family to exhibit Mills to help contribute to the household income, but George Mills declined all invitations. Following his death in 1885, however, Mills decided to exhibit herself, against the family's wishes. With the help of a friend, Mary Brown, who assisted in helping her walk and change her shoes, Mills set out for the East coast at age 25.

== Career ==
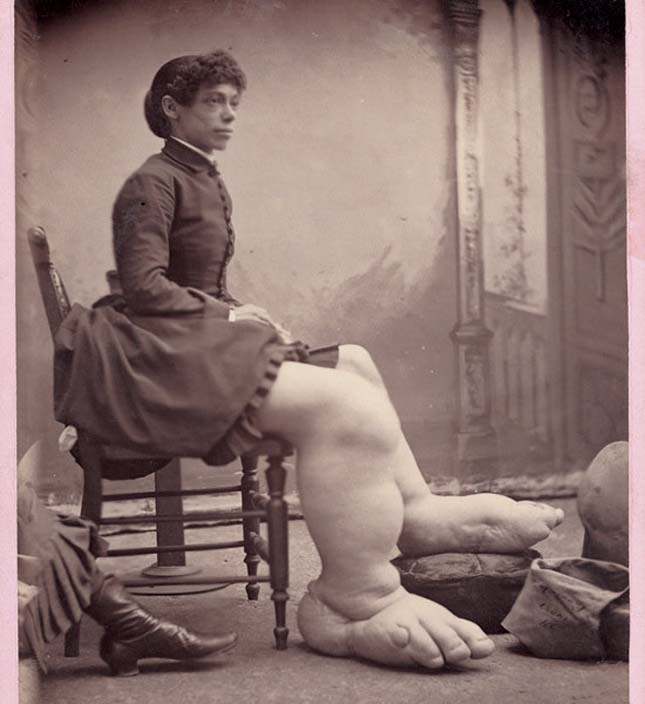
Fanny Mills Brown c. 1885

Most accounts record Mills' feet measured 19 inches long with a width of 7 inches. It was reported that she wore size 30 shoes made from three goats’ skins and socks fashioned from pillowcases; although an article in the July 26, 1885 New York Times reported that Fannie wore size 29 shoes. A reporter once described Mills' feet as "two immense hams. The toes are irregular, and the little toes are represented by two little knobs. There are no toenails, although the places where they should be are clearly defined." Her feet appeared much larger due in part to Mills' small stature. She weighed just a little over 100 pounds as an adult; approximately 115 pounds.

In 1885, Mills began to exhibit herself in New York at the Bowery Museum as "that girl from Ohio" with the "biggest feet on Earth". A column in the April 9, 1929 edition of the Sandusky Register reported that on April 9, 1886, Fannie Mills of Sandusky, the girl with big feet, was appearing in New York. As a promotional gimmick, a dowry of $5000 and a well-stocked farm was offered to any man willing to marry Mills. One attraction poster announced: "Don’t permit two big feet to stand between you and wedlock tinged with fortune!" Another advertisement stated: "The old woman that lived in a shoe would have rented out apartments if she had resided in one of Miss Mills'."

The promotion was merely a gimmick (although many potential suitors came forward), since Mills was already married; having wed William L. Brown (Mary's brother) in 1886. Brown secretly accompanied Mills while she toured both the United States and Europe. An ad in the September 27, 1886 issue of The Cincinnati Enquirer announced that Mills would be appearing for one more week before sailing for an appearance in Europe. The couple had one child in August 1887; but it was stillborn. At the height of her popularity, Mills was earning $150 a week (approximately $4000 today). Mills’ health began to decline in 1892 which forced her to retire.

Mills died on May 3, 1899 in Perkins, Erie, Ohio at age 39. The cause of death listed on her interment card was "abscess". Her death notice appeared in the May 4, 1899 issue of the Sandusky Star. She is buried in Oakland Cemetery in Sandusky, Ohio next to her husband, William, who died of cancer in 1904, age 69. The Follett House Museum in Sandusky, Ohio currently displays the lasts that were used to fashion Mills' shoes.
