= Lymphovenous anastomosis =

Medical technique

Lymphovenous anastomosis is a microsurgical procedure used to treat lymphedema and chylothoraces.

== Overview ==
Lymphedema is a chronic condition characterized by the abnormal accumulation of lymph fluid in the interstitial tissues, typically occurring in the limbs. It often results from congenital abnormalities, surgical procedures (especially those involving lymph node dissection), infections, or radiation therapy. Lymphovenous anastomosis aims to restore or improve lymphatic drainage by anastomosing (connecting) functioning lymphatic channels with adjacent small veins (venules). Advances in supermicrosurgical techniques—using high-powered microscopes and extremely fine sutures—have significantly enhanced the feasibility and outcomes of Lymphovenous anastomosis.

== Medical uses ==
Lymphovenous anastomosis is primarily employed in the management of:

- Primary lymphedema: Often resulting from congenital malformations of the lymphatic system.
- Secondary lymphedema: Commonly associated with cancer treatments, such as post-mastectomy lymphedema, or following infections like filariasis.

The procedure is most effective in patients with early-stage lymphedema or when there is still a measurable amount of functional lymphatic flow. It is frequently used in combination with conservative treatments such as compression therapy, manual lymphatic drainage, and exercise regimes as part of comprehensive lymphedema management.

== Surgical technique ==
=== Preoperative assessment ===
Patients considered for Lymphovenous anastomosis typically undergo detailed imaging studies. Techniques such as near-infrared fluorescence lymphography or indocyanine green (ICG) lymphography help in mapping functional lymphatic vessels and identifying suitable sites for anastomosis.

=== Operative procedure ===
During the procedure, performed under general or local anesthesia, the surgeon makes small incisions in the affected area. Under high magnification, functional lymphatic vessels (often less than 0.8 mm in diameter) and nearby venules are identified. Using supermicrosurgical instruments and sutures as fine as 11-0 or 12-0 nylon, the surgeon meticulously creates one or multiple anastomoses between the lymphatic vessels and the venous channels.

=== Postoperative care ===
After the surgery, patients are usually advised to continue conservative therapies such as compression garments and physiotherapy to maximize the benefits of the procedure. Regular follow-up appointments are critical to monitor limb volume reduction, assess lymphatic function, and detect any complications early.

== Outcomes and efficacy ==
Multiple studies have demonstrated that LVA can lead to:

- Reduction in limb volume.
- Improvement in lymphatic drainage.
- Decrease in the frequency of lymph-related infections (e.g., cellulitis).

The success of the procedure depends on several factors including the stage of lymphedema, the quality of the lymphatic vessels, and the surgeon's expertise. While many patients experience significant symptomatic relief and improved quality of life, outcomes may vary, and some individuals might require additional procedures or complementary treatments.

== Advantages and limitations ==
=== Advantages ===
- Minimally Invasive: LVA involves small incisions and causes minimal tissue disruption.
- Physiological Restoration: The procedure restores a natural drainage pathway, reducing reliance on external compression.
- Reduced Complications: When performed on appropriately selected patients, LVA is associated with a low complication rate.

=== Limitations ===
- Patient Selection: The efficacy of LVA is diminished in advanced lymphedema, where extensive fibrosis and impaired lymphatic function are present.
- Technical Demands: The procedure requires specialized microsurgical skills and equipment, limiting its availability to specialized centers.
- Variable Outcomes: Not all patients achieve optimal results, and some may require adjunctive procedures such as vascularized lymph node transfer (VLNT).

== History and evolution ==
The concept of surgically connecting lymphatic channels to the venous system dates back to 1970's. LVA has been first described by Gilbert (France) in 1976 and O'Brien (Australia) in 1977. It came into adoption in the 80's, when a handful of microsurgeons started applying this technique in their clinical practice. Most notably, Gong-Kang H (1981), Ho L.C.Y (Australia, 1983), Yamamoto Y(Japan, 1998), and Koshima I (Japan, 2000).

Early attempts were hampered by technical limitations. The advent of supermicrosurgery in the 1990s and 2000s—with improvements in optical magnification, instrument design, and suture materials—marked a turning point for LVA. Today, it is an established component of the surgical armamentarium for lymphedema management in many specialized centers worldwide.
