= Fred W. Stewart =

American surgical pathologist

Fred Waldorf Stewart (Binghamton, New York, 1894 – Sarasota, Florida, February 8, 1991) was an American surgical pathologist who was chief of pathology at Memorial Sloan Kettering Cancer Center.

Stewart was a friend of Cornelius P. Rhoads, who later became the director of Memorial Sloan-Kettering. Stewart, as "Ferdie," was the addressee of a controversial letter by Rhoads. Stewart also served as acting director of Memorial in 1944 while Rhoads was in the military. In 1947, while Rhoads was director of Memorial, Stewart received a grant of $30,000 for cancer pathology and other teaching. This was part of the largest aggregation of Federal cancer grants ever given to a single institution at that time, a total of $142,550.

In the 1940s, while at Memorial Hospital (which later merged with Sloan-Kettering), Stewart studied breast cancer with the distinguished Pathologist, Frank William Foote, Jr. (1911–1989).

Stewart–Treves syndrome, one of the classical sarcoma syndromes, was first described by Stewart and his fellow pathologist, Norman Tannenbaum Treves (1894–1964) in 1948, in the first issue of the Cancer Journal. Stewart was the editor of Cancer until 1961, when he was replaced by the Arizona-native pathologist, John W. Berg (1925–2007).

== Selected publications ==
- Tumors of the Breast, 1950
- "Lymphangiosarcoma in postmastectomy lymphedema. A report of six cases in elephantiasis chirurgica." Cancer, 1948
- "Occupational and Post-Traumatic Cancer," Bulletin of the New York Academy of Medicine, No. 23, 1947.
- "Lobular carcinoma in situ: a rare form of mammary cancer." The American Journal of Pathology, 1941
- The Fundamental Pathology of Infectious Myxomatosis. Am J Cancer 1931;15:2013-2028.
- "The Diagnosis of Tumors by Aspiration" Am J Pathol. 1933; 9(Suppl): 801–812.3.
- "RADIOSENSITIVITY OF TUMORS." December 1933 Arch Surg. 1933;27(6):979.
- The Production, Pathology, and Treatment of Typel Pneumococcal Meningitis in Dogs. Waverly Press, 1927
- Experimental Pneumoccoccal Meningitis in Rabbits. 1927
