= Angiosarcoma =

Cancer of the lining of the blood or lymphatic vessels

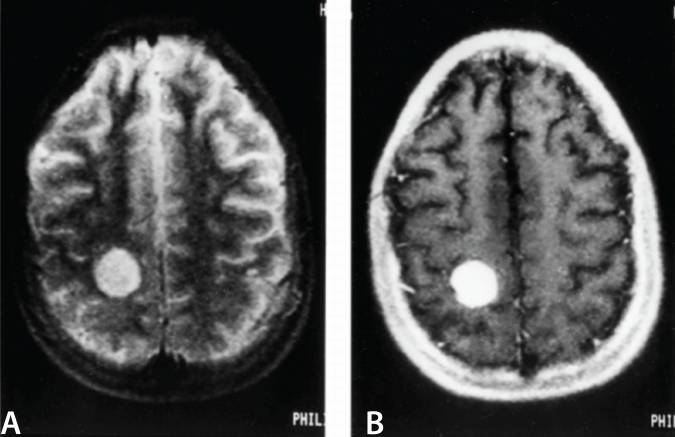
- MRI of a cardiac angiosarcoma that has metastasised to the brain.
- Specialty: Oncology
- Symptoms: Often asymptomatic, non-specific symptoms common
- Usual onset: Typically 60-70 however all age groups are affected
- Types: Hemangiosarcoma, lymphangiosarcoma, parenchymal angiosarcoma
- Causes: Unknown
- Risk factors: Lymphedema, radiation therapy, various chemicals
- Diagnostic method: Imaging, biopsy
- Treatment: Chemotherapy, radiation therapy, surgery
- Prognosis: Depends on type, overall five-year survival ~ 30-38%
- Frequency: 1 per million people (US)

Angiosarcoma is a rare and aggressive cancer that starts in the endothelial cells that line the walls of blood vessels or lymphatic vessels. Since they are made from vascular lining, they can appear anywhere and at any age, but older people are more commonly affected, and the skin is the most affected area, with approximately 60% of cases being cutaneous (skin). Specifically, the scalp makes up ~50% of angiosarcoma cases, but this is still <0.1% of all head and neck tumors. Since angiosarcoma is an umbrella term for many types of tumor that vary greatly in origin and location, many symptoms may occur, from completely asymptomatic to non-specific symptoms like skin lesions, ulceration, shortness of breath and abdominal pain. Multiple-organ involvement at time of diagnosis is common and makes it difficult to ascertain origin and how to treat it.

The cause of angiosarcoma is not known, though several risk factors are known, such as chronic lymphedema, radiation therapy and various chemicals such as arsenic and vinyl chloride. Angiosarcomas have been reported in association with long standing foreign bodies. Infrequently they have occurred in association with breast implants. Ultraviolet radiation and localized immunodeficiency may play a role in the pathogenesis of angiosarcoma. Angiosarcoma can be seen on MRI, CT and ultrasound scans, but it is usually difficult to discern it from other cancers, requiring confirmation of diagnosis by biopsy and immunohistochemical analysis.

Treatment includes surgery, chemotherapy and radiation therapy, usually all three combined. Because these cancers arise from the cells lining the blood or lymphatic vessels, they can easily metastasize to distant sites, particularly the liver and lungs. This makes them especially lethal, and an early diagnosis is usually necessary for survival. Even with treatment, prognosis is poor, with a five-year survival rate of 30–38%. This is even worse in cardiac angiosarcoma and angiosarcoma of the liver, where prognosis may be as low as three months.

Angiosarcomas make up 1–2% of soft tissue sarcomas, which in turn make up less than 1% of adult cancer. Due to this, no large studies have ever been published on the disease, with few exceeding even 100 patients; however, many case reports and small cohort studies have been published, and they cumulatively provide enough information to get a useful understanding of the disease. The rate of angiosarcoma is increasing in the US.

== Classification ==
The classification of angiosarcoma is based on both its origin and the underlying risk factors that may have contributed. This is not a comprehensive list and case reports often go into further depth.

=== Primary cutaneous angiosarcoma ===
Primary cutaneous angiosarcoma is angiosarcoma in the skin (usually the head or neck and specifically the scalp) with risk factors including lymphedema or radiation therapy, immunosuppression, and exposure to carcinogens like vinyl chloride and arsenic. They account for 50% of angiosarcoma cases.

=== Lymphedema associated angiosarcoma ===
Also called Stewart-Treves syndrome, it is a lymphangiosarcoma resulting from chronic lymphedema, swelling due to the build up of lymphatic fluid. It typically happens in the breast following a mastectomy that removes the lymph nodes of the breast. However it can happen anywhere.

=== Parenchymal angiosarcoma ===
Angiosarcoma in parenchymal organs such as the liver, breast or heart. These makes up about 40% of angiosarcoma.

==== Primary breast angiosarcoma ====
This refers to angiosarcoma of the breast without underlying causes such as radiation therapy or lymphedema. It is rare and makes up only 0.04% of breast tumors and 8% of breast sarcomas. It is very aggressive, usually presents in younger females and is often noticeable by a palpable mass. Prognosis is poor with a five-year survival between 8 and 50%.

==== Secondary breast angiosarcoma ====
These are angiosarcoma that arise in the breast from underlying causes such as lymphedema or radiation, usually from radiation therapy for breast cancer. The link between radiation therapy and angiosarcoma has been disputed by some who profess the angiosarcoma is caused by concurrent lymphedema. Secondary breast angiosarcoma tends to have a bad prognosis. Radiation-associated angiosarcoma has a five-year survival of 10 to 54%. Distant metastases are present in 27–42% of individuals and are associated with a far worse prognosis. Other prognostic factors include size of tumor, age and how much can be removed by surgery.

==== Primary brain angiosarcoma ====
Primary brain angiosarcoma are angiosarcoma that arise in the brain (i.e. not metastasised from elsewhere). They are exceedingly rare with only a few cases reported. Imaging is non specific and differential diagnosis includes most other brain tumors such as gliomas or cavernomas, requiring biopsy to confirm diagnosis, usually after surgery. Prognosis is generally poor with a median survival rate of eight months. However it varies greatly depending on whether or not the tumor has metastasised, some individuals may be rid of the disease following surgery, chemotherapy and radiation therapy.

==== Primary cardiac angiosarcoma ====
Primary cardiac angiosarcoma is an angiosarcoma that arises in the heart. Despite being very rare they are the most common malignant primary heart tumor with 10–25% of cases being angiosarcomas. Symptoms may include shortness of breath, chest pain (46%), hypotension and syncope. Superior vena cava syndrome is reportedly a complication of cardiac angiosarcoma. Due to the non-specificity of symptoms and rarity of the disease it is often missed by doctors and initial diagnosis may be delayed. A 2012 study reported that 56% of patients presented with pericardial effusion with or without cardiac tamponade. The most common finding on imaging is cardiomegaly. Prognosis is generally very poor with a mean survival rate of three months to four years following diagnosis. Metastasis at time of diagnosis is common.

==== Primary liver angiosarcoma ====
Primary angiosarcoma of the liver is the third most common type of liver cancer however it only makes up 0.1–2.0% of all liver cancers. It is rapidly fatal with most individuals dying within six months or a year even with surgical resection. Despite being associated with arsenic, vinyl chloride, thorotrast and other chemicals, 75% of liver angiosarcomas have no known cause. Men are more commonly affected in a ratio of 3–4:1 however in children girls are more often affected. If symptomatic it often presents with non-specific liver related symptoms such as abdominal pain, jaundice, fatigue, unintended weight loss and distension.

=== Deep soft tissue angiosarcoma ===
Angiosarcoma in the deep soft tissue such as adipose tissue, ligaments or muscles. These make up about 10% of angiosarcoma, and between 1-2% of all sarcomas.

== Signs and symptoms ==
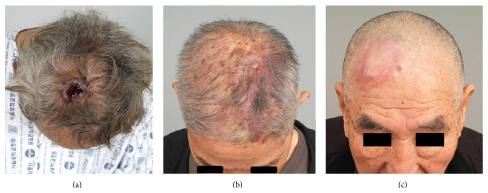
Three different types of scalp angiosarcoma. (a) ulcer type (b) bruise type (c) nodular type

Cutaneous angiosarcoma may initially look like a bruise or a purplish-red papule. It may look like a benign tumor which can delay correct diagnosis and treatment. Fungation, ulceration and bleeding may develop.

Cardiac angiosarcoma may present with shortness of breath, chest pain (46%), weight loss, anemia-like symptoms, low blood pressure and syncope.

Angiosarcomas principally metastasises through the blood with the most common site for metastasis being the lungs; this may present as pleural effusion, pneumothorax or other pleural disease. Other common sites of metastasis include the liver, bone and lymph nodes.

== Causes ==
Angiosarcoma develops when damage to the DNA of endothelial cells causes them to divide uncontrollably and prevents programmed death. This allows them to grow into a mass invading other parts of the body and consuming its resources. If part of the mass breaks off and enters the circulatory or lymphatic system (which is very common due to angiosarcomas arising from the lining of said systems) it allows them to lodge elsewhere in the body. This process is called metastasis and is a negative prognostic factor. The underlying causes of DNA damage is not understood but several risk factors are widely accepted.

Accepted risk factors include lymphedema, radiation therapy, neurofibromatosis, Maffucci syndrome, Klippel-Trenaunay syndrome and chemicals such as arsenic, thorotrast and vinyl chloride.

A 2020 study analyzing the genome of cutaneous angiosarcomas suggests that ultraviolet radiation may be a causative agent of angiosarcomas.

Immunosuppression may play a role in the pathogenesis of angiosarcoma. There have been reports of angiosarcoma in immunosuppressed individuals following kidney transplantation. The association between lymphedema and angiosarcoma may be due to localized immunodeficiency, however this hypothesis has not been confirmed. Some studies suggest a link between AIDS and angiosarcoma though this may be due to misdiagnosed Kaposi's sarcoma.

== Diagnosis ==
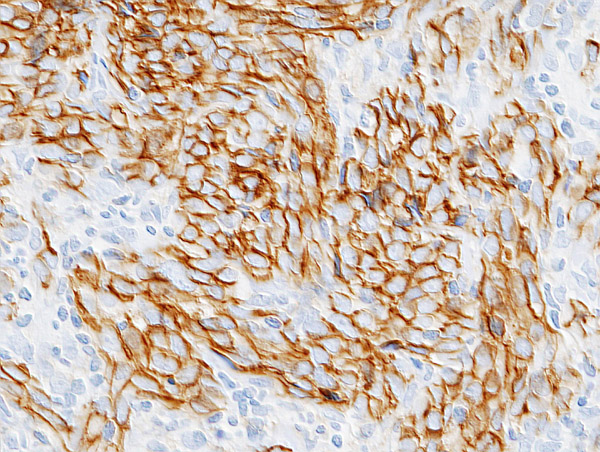
Immunostained CD31 in a cutaneous angiosarcoma

The diagnosis of angiosarcoma can be difficult due to its asymptomatic nature or non-specific symptoms. Initial diagnosis is typically done by MRI, CT or ultrasound scan, however it is typically difficult to discern if a mass is an angiosarcoma or other type of tumor such as a melanoma or carcinoma. This means that while the initial diagnosis is typically done via imaging, conclusive diagnosis has to be performed via biopsy and subsequent histological and immunohistochemical analysis.

The marker CD31 is often considered the gold standard for angiosarcoma diagnosis due to its high sensitivity and specificity. Other markers typically used include von Willebrand factor, CD34, and vascular endothelial growth factor. The absence of markers present in melanomas such as S100 and HMB-45 can help in differentiating angiosarcomas from melanomas.

== Epidemiology ==
Angiosarcomas are rare with one in a million people being diagnosed with it each year in the US. Older adults are more commonly affected and there is no gender bias, except in angiosarcoma of the liver where males are affected in a ratio of 3-4:1 and cutaneous angiosarcoma where males are again affected more commonly, particularly elderly white men.

== Other animals ==
In dogs, hemangiosarcoma is relatively common with the Golden Retriever, boxer and Labrador Retriever at higher risk of the disease than other breeds. It occurs primarily in the spleen, liver, heart, skin and subcutaneous layer of the skin. It is rapidly fatal and metastatic and can present with anything from nonspecific signs to imminent death from tumor rupture.

== See also ==
- Glomangiosarcoma
- List of cutaneous conditions
