= Lymphology Association of North America =

American lymphological organization

The Lymphology Association of North America, formerly known as the American Society of Lymphology, is a non-profit organization based in Kansas City, Missouri. The society provides current information and resources for professionals and patients interested in the healthy function and disorders of the lymphatic system, such as immune response, allergies, infectious disease and circulatory disorders lymphedema, relation to other systems of the body (integument, cardiac, venous, etc.), anatomical structures and functions, cancers, and integrative therapies. It organizes resources, conferences, and produces various publications.
