= Papillomatosis =

Lumpy skin texture due to uncontrolled cell proliferation

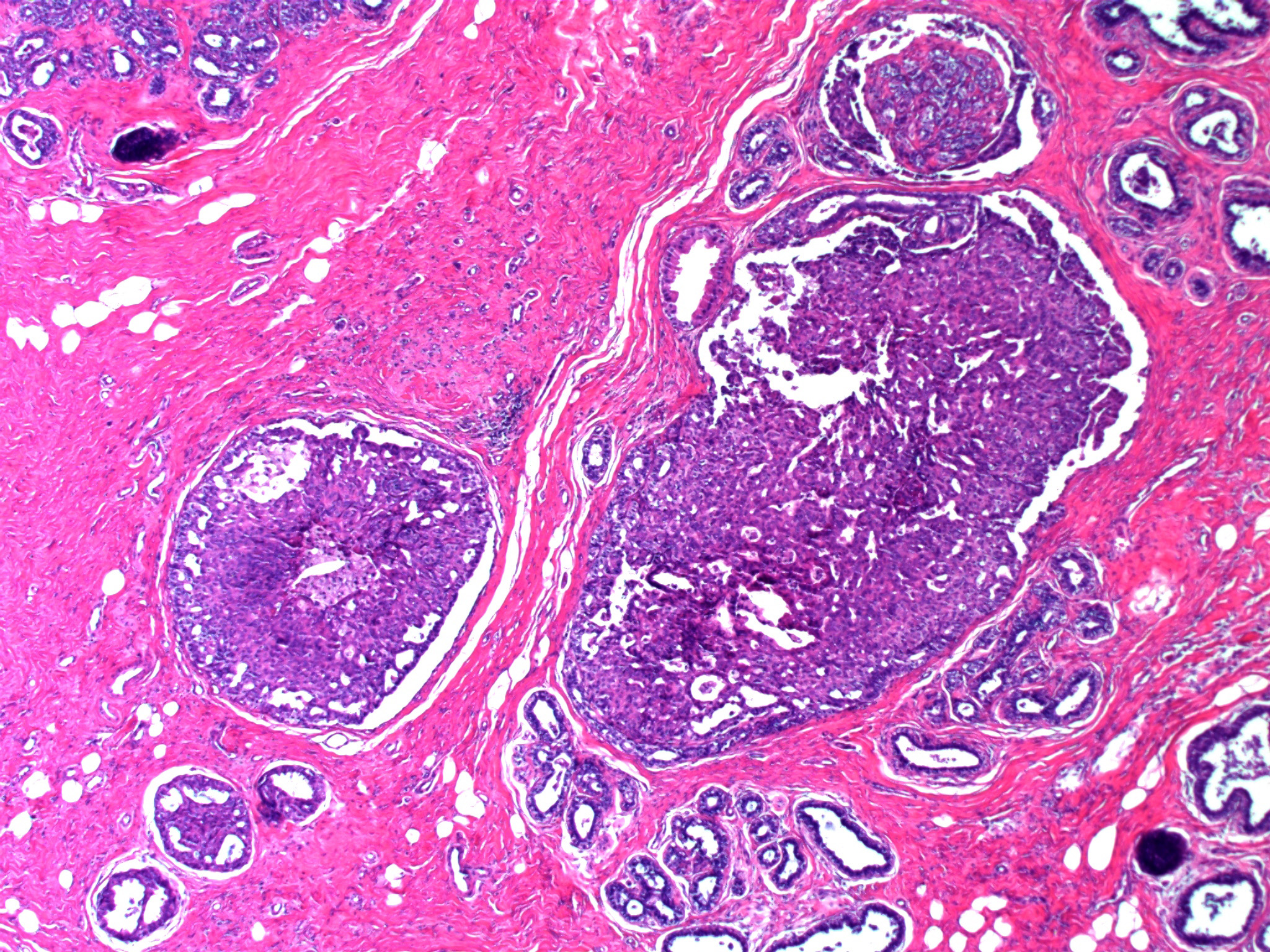
- Breast - Intraductal Papillomatosis - Low power
- Specialty: Dermatology

Papillomatosis is skin surface elevation caused by hyperplasia and enlargement of contiguous dermal papillae. These papillary projections of the epidermis form an undulating surface under microscopic examination.

== See also ==
- Skin lesion
- Skin disease
- List of skin diseases
- Papilloma
- Laryngeal papillomatosis
- Stasis papillomatosis
