= UNC45A =

Protein-coding gene in the species Homo sapiens

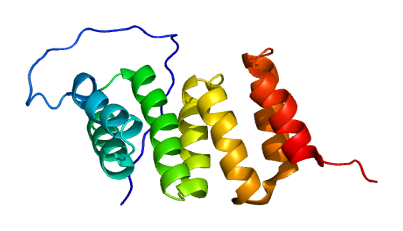

Identifiers
- Aliases: UNC45A, GC-UNC45, GCUNC-45, GCUNC45, IRO039700, SMAP-1, SMAP1, UNC-45A, unc-45 myosin chaperone A, OOHE
- External IDs: OMIM: 611219; MGI: 2142246; GeneCards: UNC45A
Available structures
PDB	Ortholog search: PDBe RCSB
PDB	List of PDB id codes 2DBA

Gene location (Human)
Chr.	Chromosome 15 (human)
Band	15q26.1	Start	90,930,180 bp
Band	15q26.1	End	90,954,093 bp

Gene location (Mouse)
Chr.	Chromosome 7 (mouse)
Band	7|7 D2	Start	79,975,040 bp
Band	7|7 D2	End	79,997,741 bp
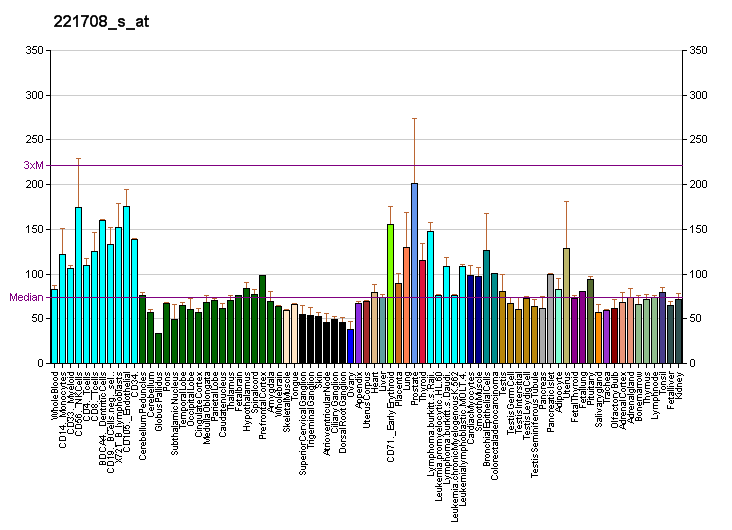
RNA expression pattern
Bgee	Human / Mouse (ortholog); Top expressed in: popliteal artery; tibial arteries; muscle layer of sigmoid colon; Descending thoracic aorta; ascending aorta; right hemisphere of cerebellum; body of uterus; skin of leg; gastric mucosa; stromal cell of endometrium / Top expressed in: external carotid artery; mucous cell of stomach; internal carotid artery; olfactory epithelium; lip; Rostral migratory stream; molar; neural layer of retina; tunica media of zone of aorta; paraventricular nucleus of hypothalamus; More reference expression data
BioGPS	More reference expression data
Gene ontology
Molecular function	Hsp90 protein binding; protein binding; cadherin binding
Cellular component	cytoplasm; perinuclear region of cytoplasm; nucleus; Golgi apparatus; cytosol; nuclear speck
Biological process	multicellular organism development; cell differentiation; muscle organ development; chaperone-mediated protein folding
Sources:Amigo / QuickGO
Orthologs
Databases	NCBI: entry; OMA: entry
Species	Human	Mouse
Entrez	55898	101869
Ensembl	ENSG00000140553	ENSMUSG00000030533
UniProt	Q9H3U1	Q99KD5
RefSeq (mRNA)	NM_001039675; NM_017979; NM_018671; NM_001323619; NM_001323620 NM_001323621	NM_133952
RefSeq (protein)	NP_001034764; NP_001310548; NP_001310549; NP_001310550; NP_061141	NP_598713
Location (UCSC)	Chr 15: 90.93 – 90.95 Mb	Chr 7: 79.98 – 80 Mb
PubMed search
- Wikidata
View/Edit Human	View/Edit Mouse

Protein unc-45 homolog A is a protein that in humans is encoded by the UNC45A gene.
