= Leigh syndrome, French Canadian type =

Mitochondrial disorder

Leigh syndrome, French Canadian type, also known as congenital lactic acidosis, Saguenay-Lac-Saint-Jean type, is a rare mitochondrial disorder which is characterized by regular metabolic acidosis, hypotonia, developmental delays and facial dysmorphy. It's associated with mutations in a gene in chromosome 2. Approximately 100 cases of this syndrome have been reported in medical literature.

== Presentation ==
People with the disorder often don't show any symptoms at birth, but instead start showing them by early infancy; babies with this condition usually start losing basic motor skills (such as walking, moving their head, etc.), they may also show intellectual disabilities, facial dysmorphy, irritability, changes in behavior, epilepsy, low blood sugar, vomiting, diarrhea, and constant fatigue.

The brain and cognitive/intellectual symptoms are mainly caused by a deterioration in the myelin sheath that protect the cells in the brainstem and/or midbrain.

The general health symptoms are mainly caused by accumulation of toxic substances in the blood. These symptoms generally affect vision, the heart, and breathing difficulties.

== Causes ==
This disorder is caused by an autosomal recessive mutation in the LRPPRC gene in chromosome 2p16. To be more specific, it is caused by a base pair substitution of 'C to T" 1119 base pairs into this gene. This transition results in a missense mutation that turns a highly conserved alanine into valine.

== Etiology ==
This condition is surprisingly common among Canadians of French descent in Saguenay-Lac-Saint-Jean, Quebec, Canada. In this area, this disorder occurs in 1 out of every 2,178 live births.

This disorder was first discovered in August 1993, when F Merante et al. described 34 children in the Saguenay-Lac-Saint-Jean area with a peculiar, never seen before variant of Leigh syndrome.
