= Tumor-like disorders of the lung pleura =

Tumor-like disorders of the lung pleura are a group of conditions that on initial radiological studies might be confused with malignant lesions. Radiologists must be aware of these conditions in order to avoid misdiagnosing patients. Examples of such lesions are: pleural plaques, thoracic splenosis, catamenial pneumothorax, pleural pseudotumor, diffuse pleural thickening, diffuse pulmonary lymphangiomatosis and Erdheim–Chester disease.

== Pleural Plaque ==
=== Pathophysiology ===
Exposure to asbestos fibers reach the pleura of the lungs through the lymphatic channels or blood stream. Historically, ship builders and insulation workers are at greater risk.

=== Symptoms ===
Affected persons are usually asymptomatic.

=== Diagnosis ===
On radiological studies, pleural plaques are visualized using conventional chest x-rays and computed tomography scans (CT scans). The locations of the lesions are mostly in the parietal pleura of the lungs, especially in the posterior/lateral regions of the thorax, diaphragmatic domes, and lung fissures. In some cases, calcifications are also evident, especially with CT scans.

=== Treatment ===
No treatment is required since pleural plaques are benign. However, studies have demonstrated that pleural plaques are an independent risk factor for developing bronchogenic carcinoma and/or mesothelioma.

== Thoracic Splenosis ==
Thoracic splenosis is splenosis that migrated to the thoracic cavity.

=== Pathophysiology ===
Following thoracoabdominal trauma, most commonly a penetrating injury, laceration of the diaphragm, and spleen allows ectopic splenic tissue to reach the pleural space of the lung.

=== Symptoms ===
Affected persons are usually asymptomatic. However, on rare occasions, thoracic splenosis can present with chest pain and/or hemoptysis.

=== Diagnosis ===
On radiological studies, thoracic splenic lesions are visualized using CT scans. Visualized lesions can be described as solitary or multiple nodules. The locations of the lesions are mostly in the lower left pleural space and/or splenic bed. Confirmation can be done using scintigraphy with 99mTc tagged heat-damaged red blood cells.

=== Treatment ===
No treatment is required since thoracic splenosis is a benign condition.

== Catamenial pneumothorax ==
=== Pathophysiology ===
Ectopic endometrial tissue reaches the pleural space of the lung or the right hemi-diaphragmatic region and erodes the visceral pleura, causing the formation of a spontaneous pneumothorax. The condition is often cyclical, due to its associations with the beginning of the menstrual cycle.

=== Symptoms ===
Affected persons usually present with recurrent spontaneous pneumothorax associated with the onset of the menstrual cycle. Additionally, chest/scapular pain and/or evidence of endometriosis in the abdominopelvic cavity are other manifestations.

=== Diagnosis ===
On radiological studies, pneumothorax is visualized using conventional chest x-rays and CT scans. In 90% of the cases, the pneumothorax is located on the right side. In some cases, small nodules can be seen in the pleura using CT scans. Confirmation can be done using video assisted thoracoscopic surgery (VATS).

=== Treatment ===
Treatment for the pneumothorax is with chest tube placement. As for the ectopic endometrial tissue, therapy with gonadotropin-releasing–hormone or resection of the lesions can improve symptoms.

== Pleural Pseudotumor ==
=== Pathophysiology ===
Initial formation of a pleural effusion causes retraction of the lung lobules and widening of the fissures. This widening of the fissures allows the accumulation of liquid and the formation of a well-defined lenticular lesion.

=== Symptoms ===
Affected persons usually present with signs of systemic fluid overload due to conditions such as congestive heart failure (CHF), cirrhosis or chronic kidney disease.

=== Diagnosis ===
On radiological studies, a pleural pseudotumor is visualized as a biconcave or lenticular lesion using conventional chest x-rays and CT scans. The lesion is most commonly located in the minor (horizontal) fissure of the lung. A pleural pseudotumor is also associated with the presence of dependent pleural effusions.

=== Treatment ===
Diuretics causes regression of the lesion.

== Diffuse Pleural Thickening ==
=== Pathophysiology ===
Inflammatory pleuritis causes fusion of the parietal and visceral pleura of the lungs. In most cases, initial formation of empyema or hemothorax is the triggering factor for this inflammatory reaction. However, it can also be associated with connective tissue disorders and exposure to asbestos.

=== Symptoms ===
Affected persons usually present with dyspnea.

=== Diagnosis ===
On radiological studies, thickening of the pleura can be visualized extending along various rib levels using conventional chest x-rays and CT scans. The lesion usually has calcification, poorly defined and irregular borders, and associated blunting of the costophrenic angles.

=== Treatment ===
No treatment is available.

== Diffuse Pulmonary Lymphangiomatosis ==
=== Pathophysiology ===
Congenital anomaly causes abnormal proliferation and dilation of lymphatic channels.

=== Symptoms ===
Affected persons are usually young adults that present with progressive dyspnea.

=== Diagnosis ===
On radiological studies, diffuse lesions are visualized throughout the thoracic cavity using CT scans. The location of the lesions is mostly in the upper lobes of the lungs, usually in a lymphatic distribution. Thickening of the pleura and interlobular septal is also evident. In addition, pleural/pericardial effusions and mediastinal fat infiltration is appreciated. Definitive diagnosis is achieved through tissue biopsy.

=== Treatment ===
Thoracentesis and pericardiocentesis are procedures performed to remove excess fluid in the pleural and pericardial spaces, respectively. There is evidence in the literature that chemotherapy and radiation therapy helps to improve symptoms.

== Erdheim–Chester Disease ==
See Erdheim–Chester disease
