= Bilateral lower extremity inflammatory lymphedema =

- Other names: BLEIL
- Specialty: Military medicine
- Symptoms: Swelling, pain, tenderness, erythema, limited range of motion in both ankles
- Usual onset: Acute
- Causes: Prolonged standing
- Differential diagnosis: Cellulitis
- Treatment: Rest and leg elevation

Bilateral lower extremity inflammatory lymphedema (BLEIL) is a distinct clinical entity characterized by acute lymphedema in both ankles and lower legs after being exposed to prolonged standing, such as during military basic training.

== Presentation ==
Patients present with an acute onset of swelling, pain, erythema, prominent tenderness, warmness and limited range of motion in both ankles. Lower legs and heels may also be involved, however the distal parts of feet and toes are usually spared. Patients may also experience high-graded fever, pitting edema and hypotension. The clinical presentation usually resembles cellulitis, however bilateral involvement is a differentiating feature.

== Cause ==
The pathophysiology is not yet well understood. Leukocytoclastic vasculitis is proposed to be the underlying cause resulting in reactive lymphedema. Prolonged standing with full knee extension and minimal movement for a prolonged period of time is postulated to induce a temporary failure in pumping the venous and lymphatic systems in the calf region leading to acute gravity-dependent venous congestion, deposition of immune complexes, thus leading to a deep dermal inflammatory vasculitis.

== Diagnosis ==
Marked elevation of inflammatory markers is seen, including white blood cells, erythrocyte sedimentation rate and C-reactive protein. Other laboratory tests are usually within the reference range. Imaging modalities, such as MRI, show extensive soft tissue edema, especially around medial and lateral malleoli.

== Treatment ==
Rest and leg elevation are the mainstay of the treatment bringing rapid relief. Compression stockings are also proposed to reduce the stasis and fasten the recovery, however there is no clinical study to prove their effectiveness in BLEIL.

== Epidemiology ==
Bilateral lower extremity inflammatory lymphedema is described in otherwise healthy young adults undergoing recruit training where they are exposed to prolonged standing. The condition manifests during the first few days of starting the training.

== History ==
The first cases reported in the literature are described in Air Force basic trainees in August 2011 at Lackland Air Force Base, Texas.
