= Emil Vodder =

Danish Dr. Emil Vodder (20 February 1896 – 17 February 1986) and his wife Dr. Estrid Vodder proposed the alternative medicine practice of "lymphology". While working on the French Riviera treating patients with chronic colds, they noticed these patients had swollen lymph nodes. In 1932, the Vodders began to study the lymph system, and developed careful hand movements to cause lymph movement. In 1936, after four years of research they introduced this technique to the world in Paris, France. They spent the rest of their lives demonstrating and teaching this method.

This careful hand movement that stretches and twists the skin to move the lymph is taught in its unaltered form today and remains standard practice for Manual lymphatic drainage, including in conventional medicine for those with dysfunctional lymphatic systems.
