= Lymphedema praecox =

- Other names: Meige disease Meige lymphedema
- Lymphedema praecox is inherited in an autosomal dominant manner
- Specialty: Medical genetics

Lymphedema praecox is a condition characterized by swelling of the soft tissues in which an excessive amount of lymph has accumulated, and generally develops in females between the ages of nine and twenty-five. This is the most common form of primary lymphedema, accounting for about 80% of the patients.

== See also ==
- Lymphedema
- Lymphedema-distichiasis syndrome
- Aagenaes syndrome
- List of cutaneous conditions
