= Felix von Winiwarter =

Austrian physician

Felix von Winiwarter (February 28, 1852 – July 10, 1931) was an Austrian physician who was a native of Vienna.

In 1876 he earned his doctorate at the University of Vienna, and remained in Vienna as an assistant in the clinic of Heinrich von Bamberger (1822–1888). Soon afterwards, he became a surgical apprentice to Theodor Billroth (1829–1894), and from 1878 to 1881 worked as a secondary physician under Leopold Ritter von Dittel (1815–1898). In 1881 he became hospital director at Landesklinikum Weinviertel in Hollabrunn. He was a younger brother to Alexander von Winiwarter (1848–1917), who also spent part of his career working with Theodor Billroth.

Winiwarter is credited for providing an early description of thromboangiitis obliterans. In 1879 he described a situation involving a 57-year-old male patient who had an unusual obliteration of the arteries and veins of the leg. He attributed this disorder to new growth of tissue from the intima, and proposed the name "endarteritis obliterans" for the disease. Winiwarter's discovery wasn't the first modern description of the condition, as three years earlier, bacteriologist Carl Friedländer (1847–1887) referred to it as "arteritis obliterans". In 1908, American surgeon Leo Buerger (1879–1943) further described the disease, and in 1924 published a monograph based on analyses taken from 500 patients. The disease was later referred to as "Winiwarter–Buerger syndrome", "Buerger's disease" or as "thromboangiitis obliterans".
