= Absence deformity of leg-cataract syndrome =

- Specialty: Medical genetics
- Complications: Vision impairment
- Causes: Genetic mutation
- Prevention: none
- Prognosis: Medium, nearing bad
- Frequency: very rare, only 2 cases have been described
- Deaths: -

Absence deformity of leg-cataract syndrome is a very rare genetic limb malformation which is characterized by unilateral absence deformity, progressive scoliosis, low stature, and optic nerve dysplasia-associated congenital cataract. It has been described in two distantly related kin of Amish descent.
