= Lymphangiosarcoma =

Cancer of blood/lymph vessel lining in swollen body parts

- Specialty: Oncology

Lymphangiosarcoma is a rare cancer which occurs in long-standing cases of primary or secondary lymphedema (swelling due to lymphatic system obstruction). It involves either the upper or lower lymphedematous extremities but is most common in upper extremities. Although its name implies lymphatic origin, it is believed to arise from endothelial cells and may be more accurately referred to as angiosarcoma.

== Signs and symptoms ==
Lymphangiosarcoma may present as a purple discoloration or a tender skin nodule in the extremity, typically on the anterior surface. It progresses to an ulcer with crusting to an extensive necrotic focus involving the skin and subcutaneous tissue. It metastasizes quickly. Lymphangiosarcoma mostly occurs in the upper arm, forearm, elbow, and anterior chest wall. Furthermore, in post-mastectomy patients, lymphangiosarcoma is associated with sarcomatous degeneration, especially in patients who have survived five or more years and who have severe lymphedema.

== Causes ==
It was previously a relatively common complication of the massive lymphedema of the arm which followed removal of axillary (arm pit) lymph nodes and lymphatic channels as part of the classical Halstedian radical mastectomy, as a treatment for breast cancer. The classical radical mastectomy was abandoned in most areas of the world in the late 1960s to early 1970s, being replaced by the much more conservative modified radical mastectomy and, more recently, by segmental breast tissue excision and radiation therapy. Because of this change in clinical practice lymphedema is now a rarity following breast cancer treatment—and post-mastectomy lymphangiosarcoma is now vanishingly rare. When it occurs following mastectomy it is known as Stewart–Treves syndrome. The pathogenesis of lymphangiosarcoma has not been resolved, however several vague mechanisms have been proposed. Stewart and Treves, proposed that a cancer causing agent is present in lymphedematous limbs. Schreiber et al. proposed that local immunodeficiency as a result of lymphedema results in a "immunologically privileged site" in which the sarcoma is able to develop.

== Treatment ==
The most successful treatment for lymphangiosarcoma is amputation of the affected limb if possible. Chemotherapy may be administered if there is evidence or suspicion of metastatic disease. Evidence supporting the effectiveness of chemotherapy is, in many cases, unclear due to a wide variety of prognostic factors and small sample size. However, there is some evidence to suggest that drugs such as paclitaxel, doxorubicin, ifosfamide, and gemcitabine exhibit antitumor activity.

== See also ==
- Angiosarcoma
- Hemangiosarcoma
- Lymphangioma
- Sarcoma
- Stewart–Treves syndrome
