= Manual lymphatic drainage =

Medical procedure

Manual lymphatic drainage (MLD) is a type of manual manipulation of the skin, not to be confused with massage, based on the hypothesis that it will encourage the natural drainage of the lymph, which carries waste products away from the tissues back toward the heart. The lymph system depends on intrinsic contractions of the smooth muscle cells in the walls of lymph vessels (peristalsis) and the movement of skeletal muscles to propel lymph through the vessels to lymph nodes and then to the lymph ducts, which return lymph to the cardiovascular system. Manual lymph drainage uses a specific amount of pressure (less than 9 oz per square inch or about 4 kPa), and rhythmic circular movements to stimulate lymph flow.

== Medical use ==
Studies show mixed results regarding the efficacy of the method in treating lymphedema, and further studies are needed. A 2013 systematic review of manual lymphatic drainage with regard to breast cancer–related lymphedema found no clear support for the effectiveness of the intervention in either preventing limb edema in at-risk women or treating women for the condition. A more recent study (2022) found that manual lymphatic drainage improved lymphedema by stimulating the formation of new collateral pathways, enhancing the overall flow and drainage of fluid out of congested areas.

== History ==
Manual lymphatic drainage was pioneered by the Danish doctors Emil Vodder and Estrid Vodder in the 1930s for the treatment of chronic sinusitis and other immune disorders. While working on the French Riviera treating patients with chronic colds, the Vodders noticed these patients had swollen lymph nodes. In 1932, at a time when the lymphatic system was poorly understood, they began to develop light rhythmic hand movements hoping to promote lymph movement. In 1936, they introduced this technique in Paris; following World War II, they returned to Copenhagen to teach other practitioners to use this therapy.

== See also ==
- Lymphotherapy
