= Limb body wall complex =

Syndrome of severe multiple congenital anomalies in the fetus

- Other names: Body stalk anomaly Cyllosomus and pleurosomus Congenital absence of umbilical cord
- Specialty: Neonatology
- Usual onset: Early fetal development
- Prognosis: Incompatible with life
- Frequency: 1 in 15,000 pregnancies

Limb body wall complex (LBWC) is a rare and severe syndrome of congenital malformations involving craniofacial and abdominal anomalies. LBWC emerges during early fetal development and is fatal. The cause of LBWC is unknown.

== Diagnosis and classification ==
Traditionally, LBWC is diagnosed by the presence of at least two of the three Van Allen criteria:

1. Exencephaly or encephalocele with facial clefts
2. Abdominal wall defects: thoracoschisis and/or abdominoschisis
3. Limb defects

As a component of the abdominal wall defect, the umbilical cord is shortened or absent with the fetus being directly attached to the placenta, a key feature in its prenatal diagnosis by ultrasound.

Several systems have been proposed to classify LBWC cases phenotypically. Russo et al. (1993) proposed two types distinguished by the presence or absence of craniofacial defects. Sahinoglu et al. (2007) proposed three types based on the anatomical location of defects:

- Type 1: Craniofacial defect and intact thoracoabdominal wall; rarely, placenta or umbilical cord attachment to cranial structures
- Type 2: Supraumbilical thoracoabdominal wall defect with abdominal organ eventration into the amniotic sac; defective umbilical cord
- Type 3: Infraumbilical abdominal wall defect with broad placenta attachment and abdominal organ eventration into the gestational sac; malformed or absent cloacal structures

In all types of LBWC, some of the fetus's organs develop outside of its body, and the placenta will adhere to the affected body structure (cranium, thorax, or abdomen). The umbilical cord is significantly shortened. As a consequence, the developing spine and limbs are contorted, leading to scoliosis and limb defects.

LBWC can be diagnosed by prenatal ultrasound as early as gestational week 11. Elevated alpha-fetoprotein levels in maternal serum may suggest the possibility of LBWC or another anomaly, motivating ultrasound follow-up. Due to LBWC's extremely poor prognosis, termination of the pregnancy is typically recommended.

== Prevalence ==
LBWC is estimated to occur in 1 in 15,000 pregnancies, with the majority of cases ending in intrauterine death. Its incidence at birth is estimated to be 0.32 in 100,000. Infants with LBWC which survive to term die during or shortly after birth.

== Causes ==
The etiology of LBWC is unknown. Several hypotheses have been proposed: defective blastodisc development, vascular disruption during early embryonic development, and early amniotic membrane rupture resulting in mechanical damage to the fetus. Case reports have reported associations between LBWC and placental trisomy 16, maternal uniparental disomy 16, mosaic trisomy 13, cocaine usage, and continued use of oral contraceptives during early gestation.
