= Stasis papillomatosis =

Skin lesions due to chronic blood pooling in a region of the body

Stasis papillomatosis is a disease characterized by chronic congestion of the extremities, with blood circulation interrupted in a specific area of the body. A consequence of this congestion and inflammation is long-term lymphatic obstruction (lymphedema). It is also typically characterized by the appearance of numerous papules. Injuries can range from small to large plates composed of brown or pink, smooth or hyperkeratotic papules. The most typical areas where injuries occur are the back of the feet, the toes, the legs, and the area around a venous ulcer formed in the extremities, although the latter is the rarest of all. These injuries include pachydermia (thickening of the skin), lymphedema (swelling due to lymph vessel blockage), lymphomastic verrucosis and elephantosis verrucosa. The disease can be either localized or generalized; the localized form makes up 78% of cases. Treatment includes surgical and pharmaceutical intervention; indications for partial removal include advanced fibrotic lymphedema and elephantiasis. Despite the existence of these treatments, chronic venous edema, which is a derivation of stasis papillomatosis, is only partially reversible. The skin is also affected and its partial removal may mean that the skin and the subcutaneous tissue are excised. A side effect of the procedure is the destruction of existing cutaneous lymphatic vessels. It also risks papillomatosis, skin necrosis and edema exacerbation.

All etiologies lead to local dermal lymphostasis pathogenesis. A maximum variation was observed after the resection of block subcutaneous tissue in patients with congenital lymphedema. Signals that the current condition are different, either in the dermis or in the subcutaneous area.

== Presentation ==
=== Complications ===
Chronic inflammation can cause long term lymphatic obstruction. Typically, patients have disorders that present local nodes, primary lymphedema and chronic venous insufficiency. Erysipelas and trauma are major risk factors. Lymphatic edema can be developed in many acral cases accompanied by a thickening of the folds of the skin, hyperkeratosis and papillomatosis. Chronic venous edema is only partially reversible and soon becomes hard, especially confirming tenderness. All structures of the skin are affected. Dilated dermal lymphatic vessels with consequent superior organization and fibrosis result in papillomatosis. As dermal lymphatic stasis progresses, these skin changes become more marked and known as elephantiasis. Occasionally, tissue fibrosis and thickening may become so marked in the later stages of lymphedema that pitting is absent. Recurrent cellulitis, erysipelas and dermato-LAM-adenitis are complications of chronic lymphedema.

== Causes ==
The reason for its occurrence is unknown. Investigations have suspected that obesity and preceding psoriatic lesions cause local lymphatic disturbances, followed by the development of stasis papillomatosis. On the other hand, genetic or environmental factors may play a role. Some investigators have speculated that it represents an allergic response to an epidermal protein antigen created through increased hydrostatic pressure, whereas others believe that the skin has been compromised and is more susceptible to irritation and trauma.

Age is an important factor because as some people get older the veins which carry blood from the legs back to the heart do not work as well as they use to. This causes fluid to settle in the lower legs.

The most important cause of this condition is insufficient lymphatic drainage, causing soft tissue swelling due to fluid accumulation. Obstruction of lymphatic tissue causes increased intravascular tissue protein; this will increase the production of fibroblasts and mast cells. Lymphatic obstruction due to any cause can increase the amount of proteins in the intravascular tissue, either by root osmotic pressure or because it absorbs a little liquid. The further roteins increase the vascular fluid, fibroblasts and promote the ploriferation of mast cells which produce the clinical symptoms of nonpitting edema. The epidermis may be hyperkeratotic and warty and this predisposes to tissue cracks and allows secondary infection.

== Diagnosis ==
Stasis Papillomatosis is similar to AGEP (Acute generalized exanthematous pustulosis) from pustular psoriasis; criteria for histopathologic distinction have been proposed: papillary edema, vasculitis, exocytosis of eosinophils and single-cell necrosis of keratinocytes in AGEP and acanthosis and papillomatosis in pustular psoriasis.

An example that illustrates the difference between SP and Stasis Papillomatosis and the histology diagnosis is: "a markedly obese, 41-year-old Japanese man who had suffered from psoriasis vulgaris for several years visited hospital with elephantiasis-like swelling of his lower legs of three months' duration. His right lower leg showed marked papillomatosis with thick scales, and the left lower leg was eroded and papillomatous. Although direct lymphography of his lower extremities showed no abnormality, indirect lymphography revealed local lymphatic damage in the involved skin". Histological examination showed hyperkeratosis, marked papillomatosis, proliferation of capillaries in the upper dermis, and lymphectasia in the lower dermis. It was suspected that obesity and the preceding psoriatic lesions caused local lymphatic disturbances, followed by the development of stasis papillomatosis.

== Treatment ==
This disease is caused by problems in the circulatory system; thus, the legs should be elevated as much as possible to help the return of the blood. At night it is advisable to sleep with a pillow under the lower legs. In the evening, it is not unusual for legs to be swollen. The volume of the lower leg can increase to up to 100ml after a long working day or up to 200ml after a long-haul flight without moving.

In the example of the 41-year-old Japanese man the lesions were much improved by washing and topical use of corticosteroids for two months, also oral antibiotics like cephalexin are used if cellulitis is present. Moist exudative inflammation and moist ulcers respond to tepid wet compresses of Burow's solution or just saline or water for 30 to 60 minutes several times a day. But in worse cases, edema that does not disappear spontaneously within a few hours or after a walk, is described as pathological, so it needs to have a special treatment. It is very important to say that Papillamitosis, bilateral and marked edema with few symptoms are mostly caused by the systemic circulation (heart, kidneys, liver).

Papillamitosis is associated with symptoms and/or clinical signs such as dilated superficial veins, varicose veins and changes in the skin. Edema and its complication Papillamitosis are only partially reversible and soon becomes hard, which is mainly confirmed on palpation. All skin structures are affected and this is characterized by the term. Lymphoedema may develop in many cases accompanied by acral thickening of the skin folds, hyperkeratosis and papillomatosis.
