= Lymphedema–distichiasis syndrome =

- Other names: Lymphedema with distichiasis
- Lymphedema–distichiasis syndrome is inherited in an autosomal dominant manner

Lymphedema–distichiasis syndrome is a medical condition associated with the FOXC2 gene. People with this hereditary condition have a double row of eyelashes, which is called distichiasis, and a risk of swollen limbs due to problems in the lymphatic system.

== Genetics ==
Lymphedema-distichiasis is inherited in an autosomal dominant fashion. It is estimated that only 1/4 of diagnosed individuals did not inherit the condition but rather acquired the syndrome via a de novo mutation. Symptoms emerge between the life stages of puberty to early adulthood (around 30 years old). This is the result of a mutation in the FOXC2 gene.

== Mutations ==
p.Y41F, a missense mutation, is also located in FOXC2 AD-1. p.Y41F is one of eleven mutations found in the FOXC2 gene. It was determined that of these 11 mutations, one was nonsense, six were missense, and four were frameshift mutations.

== Symptoms ==
The main symptoms of lymphedema-distichiasis are limb swelling and a double row of eyelashes. Symptoms that have been noted in some but not all cases include cysts, light sensitivity, cardiac defects, cleft palate, and eye problems such as astigmatism and cornea scarring.

== Syndrome diagnosis and management ==
Currently, the most accurate test to determine if an individual is affected by lymphedema-distichiasis syndrome is done via Sanger sequencing, which includes whole genome analysis and single gene and multigene testing. Sequenced DNA that exhibits mutations in the FOXC2 gene are considered confirmed clinical diagnoses. In addition to Sanger sequencing, Multiplex Ligation Probe Amplification (MLPA) can be used to determine if duplications and deletions in FOXC2 are present in an individual, making it a practical testing mechanism. Lastly, diagnosis is sometimes determined without genome testing. If an individual exhibits multiple symptoms of lymphedema-distichiasis and has a medical history consistent with known lymphedema-distichiasis symptoms, then their diagnosis is confirmed via clinical evaluation.

Lymphedema-distichiasis is a rare genetic disease, it is unknown how many individuals are affected and what the frequency of the condition is. As a result, there are few syndrome management techniques: Symptoms of distichiasis can be minimized via eyelash plucking, electrolysis and other various treatments. Limb swelling can be reduced using compression clothing and bandages. Lastly, rapid treatment of broken skin and cellulitis lessens severity of symptoms.

== See also ==
- Lymphedema
- Aagenaes syndrome
- List of cutaneous conditions
