= Fungating lesion =

Type of skin lesion

A fungating lesion is a skin lesion that fungates, that is, becomes like a fungus in its appearance or growth rate. It is marked by ulcerations (breaks on the skin or surface of an organ) and necrosis (death of living tissue) and usually presents a foul odor. This kind of lesion may occur in many types of cancer, including breast cancer, melanoma, and squamous cell carcinoma, and especially in advanced disease. The characteristic malodorous smell is caused by dimethyl trisulfide. It is usually not a fungal infection but rather a neoplastic growth with necrosing portions.

There is weak evidence, from one study, that 6% miltefosine solution applied topically on superficial fungating breast lesions of less than 1 cm in size, on patients who received previous radiotherapy, surgery, hormonal therapy or chemotherapy for their breast cancer, may slow the disease progression.
