= FOXC2 =

Protein-coding gene in the species Homo sapiens

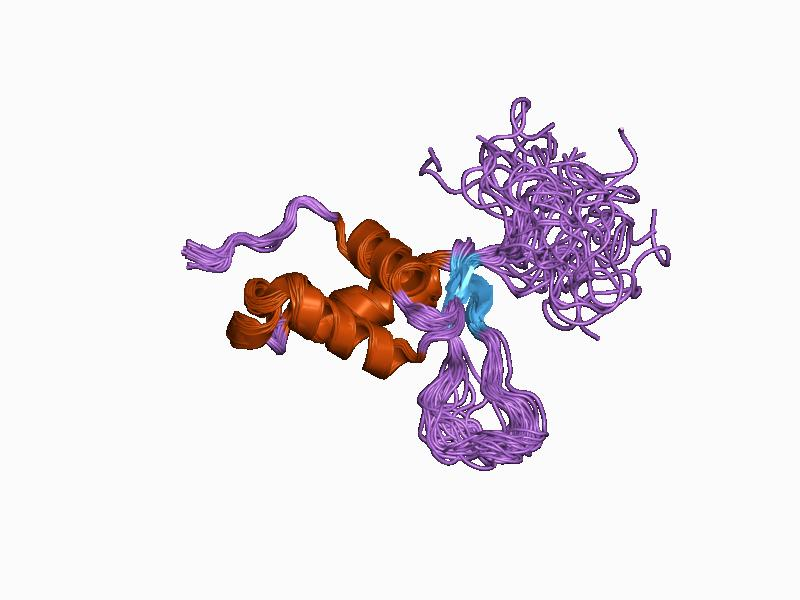

Identifiers
- Aliases: FOXC2, FKHL14, LD, MFH-1, MFH1, forkhead box C2
- External IDs: OMIM: 602402; MGI: 1347481; GeneCards: FOXC2
Available structures
PDB	Ortholog search: PDBe RCSB
PDB	List of PDB id codes 1D5V

Gene location (Human)
Chr.	Chromosome 16 (human)
Band	16q24.1	Start	86,566,829 bp
Band	16q24.1	End	86,569,728 bp

Gene location (Mouse)
Chr.	Chromosome 8 (mouse)
Band	8 E1|8 70.33 cM	Start	121,842,910 bp
Band	8 E1|8 70.33 cM	End	121,845,634 bp
RNA expression pattern
Bgee	Human / Mouse (ortholog); Top expressed in: vena cava; palpebral conjunctiva; popliteal artery; trigeminal ganglion; tibial arteries; urethra; ascending aorta; spinal ganglia; Descending thoracic aorta; cardiac muscle tissue of right atrium / Top expressed in: aortic arches; ascending aorta; fifth metatarsal bone; renal corpuscle; optic nerve; aortic valve; fourth metatarsal bone; somite; sclerotome; lumbar spinal ganglion; More reference expression data
BioGPS	n/a
Gene ontology
Molecular function	sequence-specific DNA binding; DNA binding; DNA-binding transcription factor activity; DNA-binding transcription activator activity, RNA polymerase II-specific; protein binding; identical protein binding; transcription factor activity, RNA polymerase II distal enhancer sequence-specific binding; chromatin DNA binding; promoter-specific chromatin binding; DNA-binding transcription factor activity, RNA polymerase II-specific; RNA polymerase II transcription regulatory region sequence-specific DNA binding; RNA polymerase II cis-regulatory region sequence-specific DNA binding
Cellular component	nucleus; nucleoplasm; nuclear body
Biological process	Notch signaling pathway; somitogenesis; embryonic skeletal system morphogenesis; skeletal system development; insulin receptor signaling pathway; ureteric bud development; regulation of transcription, DNA-templated; positive regulation of cell migration involved in sprouting angiogenesis; neural crest cell development; paraxial mesoderm formation; paraxial mesodermal cell fate commitment; ossification; lymphangiogenesis; collagen fibril organization; kidney development; glomerular mesangial cell development; heart morphogenesis; negative regulation of transcription by RNA polymerase II; cardiac muscle cell proliferation; lymph vessel development; transcription, DNA-templated; embryonic heart tube development; positive regulation of endothelial cell migration; positive regulation of transcription, DNA-templated; multicellular organism development; ventricular cardiac muscle tissue morphogenesis; development of the heart; blood vessel remodeling; vascular endothelial growth factor receptor signaling pathway; blood vessel development; positive regulation of vascular wound healing; artery morphogenesis; branching involved in blood vessel morphogenesis; glomerular visceral epithelial cell differentiation; response to hormone; embryonic viscerocranium morphogenesis; embryonic cranial skeleton morphogenesis; camera-type eye development; glomerular endothelium development; positive regulation of cell adhesion mediated by integrin; mesoderm development; regulation of organ growth; metanephros development; cell population proliferation; positive regulation of transcription by RNA polymerase II; negative regulation of apoptotic process involved in outflow tract morphogenesis; transcription by RNA polymerase II; cell differentiation; regulation of transcription by RNA polymerase II; anatomical structure morphogenesis; negative regulation of cold-induced thermogenesis
Sources:Amigo / QuickGO
Orthologs
Databases	NCBI: entry; OMA: entry
Species	Human	Mouse
Entrez	2303	14234
Ensembl	ENSG00000176692	ENSMUSG00000046714
UniProt	Q99958	Q61850
RefSeq (mRNA)	NM_005251	NM_013519
RefSeq (protein)	NP_005242	NP_038547
Location (UCSC)	Chr 16: 86.57 – 86.57 Mb	Chr 8: 121.84 – 121.85 Mb
PubMed search
- Wikidata
View/Edit Human	View/Edit Mouse

Forkhead box protein C2 (FOXC2) also known as forkhead-related protein FKHL14 (FKHL14), transcription factor FKH-14, or mesenchyme fork head protein 1 (MFH1) is a protein that in humans is encoded by the FOXC2 gene. FOXC2 is a member of the fork head box (FOX) family of transcription factors.

== Structure and function ==
The protein is 501 amino acids in length. The gene has no introns; the single exon is approximately 1.5kb in size.

FOX transcription factors are expressed during development and are associated with a number of cellular and developmental differentiation processes. FOXC2 is required during early development of the kidneys, including differentiation of podocytes and maturation of the glomerular basement membrane. It is also involved in the early development of the heart.

An increased expression of FOXC2 in adipocytes can increase the amount of brown adipose tissue leading to lower weight and an increased sensitivity to insulin.

== Role in disease ==
Absence of FOXC2 has been shown to lead to the failure of lymphatic valves to form and problems with lymphatic remodelling. A number of mutations in the FOXC2 gene have been associated with Lymphedema–distichiasis syndrome, It has also been suggested that there may be a link between polymorphisms in FOXC2 and varicose veins.

FOXC2 is also involved in cancer metastases. In particular, expression of FOXC2 is induced when epithelial cells undergo an epithelial-mesenchymal transition (EMT) and become mesenchymal looking cells. EMT can be induced by a number of genes including Snail, Twist, Goosecoid, and TGF-beta 1. Overexpression of FOXC2 has been noted in subtypes of breast cancer which are highly metastatic. Suppression of FOXC2 expression using shRNA in a highly metastatic breast cancer model blocks their metastatic ability.
