= Lymphedema =

Swelling due to a compromised lymphatic system

- Other names: Lymphatic obstruction, lymphatic insufficiency
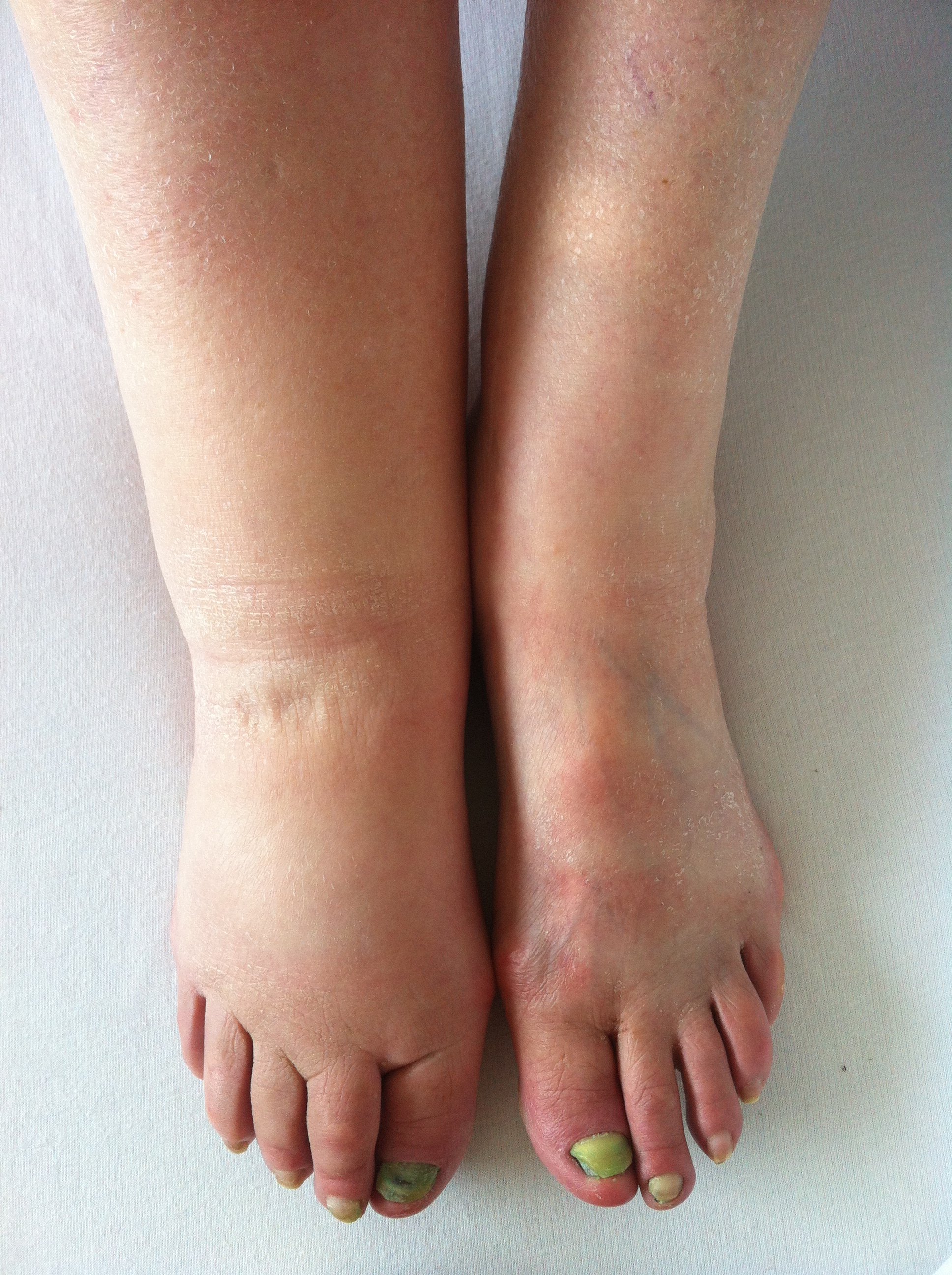
- Lower extremity lymphedema
- Specialty: Vascular medicine, Rheumatology, Physical medicine and rehabilitation, General surgery, Plastic surgery
- Diagnostic method: Based on symptoms
- Differential diagnosis: Lipodystrophy, venous insufficiency

Lymphedema (USA), lymphoedema (UK) also known as lymphatic edema (US)/oedema (UK), is a condition of localized swelling caused by a compromised lymphatic system. The lymphatic system functions as a critical portion of the body's immune system and returns interstitial fluid to the bloodstream.

Lymphedema is most frequently a complication of cancer treatment or parasitic infections, but it can also be seen in a number of genetic disorders. Tissues with lymphedema are at high risk of infection because the lymphatic system has been compromised.

Though incurable and progressive, a number of treatments may improve symptoms. This commonly includes compression therapy, good skin care, exercise, and manual lymphatic drainage (MLD), which together are known as combined decongestive therapy. Diuretics are not useful.

== Signs and symptoms ==
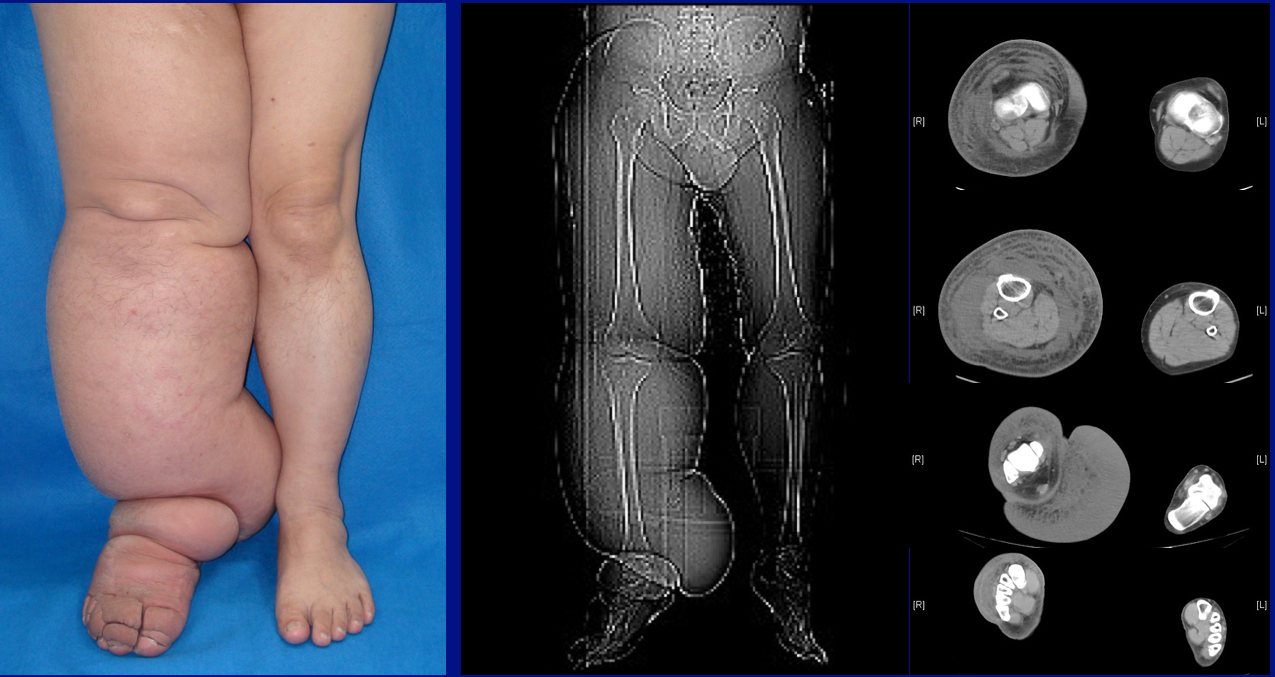
Lymphedema seen on CT scan

The most common manifestation of lymphedema is soft tissue swelling (edema). As the disorder progresses, worsening edema and skin changes including discoloration, verrucous (wart-like) hyperplasia, hyperkeratosis, papillomatosis, dermal thickening, and ulcers may be seen. Additionally, there is increased risk of infection of the skin, known as erysipelas.

=== Complications ===
When lymphatic impairment becomes so great that the collected lymph fluid exceeds the lymphatic system's ability to transport it, an abnormal amount of protein-rich fluid collects in the tissues. Left untreated, this stagnant, protein-rich fluid causes tissue channels to increase in size and number, reducing oxygen availability. This interferes with wound healing and provides a rich medium for bacterial growth which can result in skin infections, lymphangitis, lymphadenitis, stasis papillomatosis and, in severe cases, skin ulcers. It is vital for lymphedema patients to be aware of the symptoms of infection and to seek immediate treatment, since recurrent infections or cellulitis, in addition to their inherent danger, further damage the lymphatic system and set up a vicious circle.

In rare cases, lymphedema may lead to a form of cancer called lymphangiosarcoma, although the mechanism of carcinogenesis is not understood. Lymphedema-associated lymphangiosarcoma is called Stewart–Treves syndrome. Lymphangiosarcoma most frequently occurs in cases of long-standing lymphedema. The incidence of angiosarcoma five years after radical mastectomy is estimated to be 0.45% in surviving patients. Lymphedema is also associated with a low grade form of cancer called retiform hemangioendothelioma (a low grade angiosarcoma).

Lymphedema can be disfiguring, and may result in a poor body image and psychological distress. Complications of lymphedema can cause difficulties in activities of daily living.

== Causes and risk factors ==
Lymphedema may be inherited (primary) or caused by injury to the lymphatic vessels (secondary). There are also risk factors that may increase one's risk of developing lymphedema such as old age, being overweight or obese, and having rheumatic or psoriatic arthritis. A body mass index (BMI) >30 increases the risk of lymphedema almost 3-fold when radiation therapy is included with breast-conserving mastectomy.

=== Lymph node damage ===
Lymphedema is most commonly seen after lymph node dissection, surgery or radiation therapy (RT) for the treatment of cancer, most notably breast cancer. RT's immediate consequence is minimal, lymphatic vessel impact appearing later as its irradiated surrounding tissue develops fibrotic scarring, becoming dense and fibrous, proximal pressure increasing, ultimately restricting lymphatic flow. Lymphedema may also be associated with injury or certain diseases or conditions that may inhibit the lymphatic system from functioning properly. It can also be caused by damage to the lymphatic system from infections such as cellulitis. In tropical areas of the world where parasitic filarial worms are endemic, a common cause of secondary lymphedema is filariasis.

Primary lymphedema may be congenital or may arise sporadically. Multiple syndromes are associated with primary lymphedema, including Turner syndrome, Milroy's disease, and Klippel–Trénaunay syndrome. In these syndromes it may occur as a result of absent or malformed lymph nodes or lymphatic channels. Lymphedema can be present at birth, develop at the onset of puberty (praecox), or not become apparent for many years into adulthood (tarda). In men, lower-limb primary lymphedema is most common, occurring in one or both legs. Some cases of lymphedema may be associated with other vascular abnormalities.

Secondary lymphedema affects both men and women, and, in Western countries, is most commonly due to cancer treatment. In women, it is most prevalent in an upper limb after breast cancer surgery, especially axillary lymph node dissection, and occurs on the same side of the body as the surgery. Breast and trunk lymphedema can also occur but go unrecognised as there is swelling in the area after surgery, and its symptoms (peau d'orange and an inverted nipple) can be confused with post surgery fat necrosis. Between 38 and 89% of breast cancer patients have lymphedema due to axillary lymph node dissection or radiation. Unilateral lower limb lymphedema was observed in up to 41% of patients in a 1994 gynecological cancer study. A 2020 study compared contraindications between the two then-favored radiation delivery modalities for gynecological cancer. Vaginal brachytherapy, able to target gynecological malignancies while minimizing radiation to nearby organs and lymph nodes, was estimated to have a 11% lymphedema risk. Pelvic external beam radiation, provided as intensity modulated RT (IMRT), targets the malignancy but its wider radiation field traverses more of the lymphatic system, raising lymphedema risk to 71%. For men treated for prostate cancer, a 5–66% incidence has been reported, with the rate depending on the extent of staging conducted (biopsy only, limited diagnostic dissection, or radical removal of lymph glands) prior to radiotherapy.

Head and neck lymphedema can be caused by surgery or radiation therapy for tongue or throat cancer. It may also occur in the lower limbs or groin after surgery for colon, ovarian or uterine cancer, if removal of lymph nodes or radiation therapy is required. Surgery or RT for prostate, colon and testicular cancers may result in secondary lymphedema, particularly when lymph nodes were impacted. Lymph nodes have a high propensity to transform into fibrous tissue if previously invaded by regional metastasis, compounding post-RT fibrotic mechanical insufficiency issues.

The onset of secondary lymphedema in patients who have had cancer surgery has also been linked to aircraft flight (likely due to decreased cabin pressure or relative immobility). For cancer survivors wearing a prescribed and properly fitted compression garment may help decrease swelling during air travel.

Some cases of lower-limb lymphedema have been associated with the use of tamoxifen, due to blood clots and deep vein thrombosis (DVT) associated with this medication. Resolution of the blood clots or DVT is needed before lymphedema treatment can be initiated.

=== At birth ===
Hereditary lymphedema is a primary lymphedema – swelling that results from abnormalities in the lymphatic system that are present from birth. Swelling may be present in a single limb, several limbs, genitalia, or the face. It is sometimes diagnosed prenatally by a nuchal scan or postnatally by lymphoscintigraphy.

The most common cause is Meige disease which usually presents at puberty. Another form of hereditary lymphedema is Milroy's disease, caused by mutations in the VEGFR3 gene. Hereditary lymphedema is frequently syndromic and is associated with Turner syndrome, lymphedema–distichiasis syndrome, yellow nail syndrome, and Klippel–Trénaunay syndrome.

One defined genetic cause for hereditary lymphedema is GATA2 deficiency. This deficiency is a grouping of several disorders caused by a single defect: familial or sporadic inactivating mutations in one of the two parental GATA2 genes. These autosomal dominant mutations cause a reduction, i.e. a haploinsufficiency, in the cellular levels of the gene's product, GATA2. The GATA2 protein is a transcription factor critical for the development, maintenance, and functionality of blood-forming, lymphatic-forming, and other tissue-forming stem cells. Due to these mutations cellular levels of GATA2 are deficient and over time individuals develop hematological, immunological, lymphatic, and other disorders. GATA2 deficiency-induced defects in the lymphatic vessels and valves underlies the development of lymphedema, primarily in the lower extremities but may also occur in places such as the face or testes. This form of the deficiency, when coupled with sensorineural hearing loss, which may also be due to faulty development of the lymphatic system, is sometimes termed Emberger syndrome.

Primary lymphedema occurs in approximately one to three births out of every 10,000 births, with a female to male ratio of 3.5:1. In North America, the incidence of primary lymphedema is approximately 1.15 births out of every 100,000 births. Compared to secondary lymphedema, primary lymphedema is relatively rare.

=== Inflammatory lymphedema ===
Bilateral lower extremity inflammatory lymphedema (BLEIL) is a distinct type of lymphedema occurring in a setting of acute and prolonged standing, such as in new recruits during basic training. Possible underlying mechanisms may include venous congestion and inflammatory vasculitis.

== Physiology ==
Lymph is formed from the fluid that filters out of blood and contains proteins, cellular debris, bacteria, etc. This fluid is collected by the initial lymph collectors that are blind-ended endothelial-lined vessels with fenestrated openings that allow fluids and particles as large as cells to enter. Once inside the lumen of the lymphatic vessels, the fluid is guided along increasingly larger vessels, first with rudimentary valves to prevent backflow, later with complete valves similar to the venous valve. Once the lymph enters the fully valved lymphatic vessels, it is pumped by a rhythmic peristaltic-like action by smooth muscle cells within the lymphatic vessel walls. This peristaltic action is the primary driving force moving lymph within its vessel walls. The sympathetic nervous system regulates the frequency and power of the contractions. Lymph movement can be influenced by the pressure of nearby muscle contraction, arterial pulse pressure and the vacuum created in the chest cavity during respiration, but these passive forces contribute only a minor percentage of lymph transport. The fluids collected are pumped into continually larger vessels and through lymph nodes, which remove debris and police the fluid for dangerous microbes. The lymph ends its journey in the thoracic duct or right lymphatic duct, which drain into the blood circulation.

Several research groups have hypothesized that chronic inflammation is a key regulator in the development of lymphedema. Th cells, particularly Th2 differentiation, play a crucial role in the pathophysiology of lymphedema. Research has shown that increased expression of Th2-inducing cytokines in the epidermal cells of the lymphoedematous limb. Treatment with QBX258 has been found to decrease hyperkeratosis and fibrosis, reduce the number of CD4+ cells, and normalize the expression of Th2-inducing cytokines and IL13R by keratinocytes. These findings suggest that epidermal cells may initiate or coordinate chronic Th2 responses in lymphedema.

=== Role of T-cell inflammation and Th2 response ===
Lymphedema involves a complex interplay of inflammatory processes. Recent research has shed light on the role of T-cell inflammation and the Th2 immune response in the initiation of lymphedema.

==== T-cell inflammation and fibrosis ====
Studies have revealed that sustained lymphatic stasis results in the infiltration of CD4+ T-cells, leading to inflammation and fibrosis within affected tissues.

== Diagnosis ==
Diagnosis is generally based on signs and symptoms, with testing used to rule out other potential causes. An accurate diagnosis and staging may help with management. A swollen limb can result from different conditions that require different treatments. Diagnosis of lymphedema is currently based on history, physical exam, and limb measurements. Imaging studies such as lymphoscintigraphy and indocyanine green lymphography are only required when surgery is being considered. However, the ideal method of staging to guide treatment is controversial because of several different proposed protocols.

Lymphedema can occur in both the upper and lower extremities, and in some cases, the head and neck. Assessment of the extremities first begins with a visual inspection; color, presence of hair, visible veins, size and any sores or ulcerations are noted. Lack of hair may indicate an arterial circulation problem. In cases of swelling, the extremities' circumference is measured over time for reference. In early stages of lymphedema, elevating the limb may reduce or eliminate the swelling. Palpation of the wrist or ankle can determine the degree of swelling; assessment includes a check of the pulses. The axillary or inguinal lymph nodes may be enlarged due to the swelling. Enlargement of the nodes lasting more than three weeks may indicate infection or other illnesses (such as sequela from breast cancer surgery) requiring further medical attention.

Diagnosis or early detection of lymphedema is difficult. The first signs may be subjective observations such as a feeling of heaviness in the affected extremity. These may be symptomatic of early-stage lymphedema where accumulation of lymph is mild and not detectable by changes in volume or circumference. As lymphedema progresses, definitive diagnosis is commonly based upon an objective measurement of differences between the affected or at-risk limb and the opposite unaffected limb, e.g. in volume or circumference. No generally accepted criterion is definitively diagnostic, although a volume difference of 200 ml between limbs or a 4 cm (1.6 in) difference (at a single measurement site or set intervals along the limb) is often used. Bioimpedance measurement (which measures the amount of fluid in a limb) offers greater sensitivity than other methods. Devices like SOZO utilize Bioimpedence Analysis (BIA) by sending a current through the body and measuring the resultant impedance. Another approach involves Tissue Dielectric Constant (TDC) measurement, used by devices such as Delfin Technology's MoistureMeterD and LymphScanner, which employ microwaves to detect changes in the dielectric properties of tissue. These innovative techniques have become integral to official protocols for lymphedema detection.

Chronic venous stasis changes can mimic early lymphedema, but are more often bilateral and symmetric. Lipedema can also mimic lymphedema, however lipedema characteristically spares the feet beginning abruptly at the malleolus (ankle). As a part of the initial work-up before diagnosing lymphedema, it may be necessary to exclude other potential causes of lower extremity swelling such as kidney failure, hypoalbuminemia, congestive heart-failure, protein-losing kidney disease, pulmonary hypertension, obesity, pregnancy and drug-induced edema.

=== Classification ===
==== International Society of Lymphology ====
The International Society of Lymphology (ISL) states that most of its members rely on a three-stage scale for classification of a lymphedematous limb, with recognition of stage 0, a latent stage. They note that "a limb may exhibit more than one stage, which may reflect alterations in different lymphatic territories".

- Stage 0: A latent or subclinical condition where swelling is not yet evident despite impaired lymph transport, subtle alterations in tissue fluid/composition, and changes in subjective symptoms. It can be transitory and may exist months or years before overt edema occurs.
- Stage I: Early accumulation of fluid relatively high in protein content (e.g., in comparison with "venous" edema) which subsides with limb elevation. Pitting may occur. An increase in various types of proliferating cells may also be seen.
- Stage II: Permanent accumulation of pathologic solids such as fat and proteins. Limb elevation alone rarely reduces tissue swelling. Pitting is manifest. Later in stage II, the limb may not pit as excess subcutaneous fat and fibrosis develop.
- Stage III: Encompasses lymphostatic elephantiasis where pitting can be absent and trophic skin changes such as acanthosis, alterations in skin character and thickness, further deposition of fat and fibrosis, and warty overgrowths have developed.

==== Cheng's Lymphedema Grading ====
Imaging modalities have been suggested as useful adjuncts to the ISL staging system to clarify the diagnosis, such as Cheng's Lymphedema Grading tool, which assesses the severity of extremity lymphedema based on objective limb measurements and provides appropriate options for management.

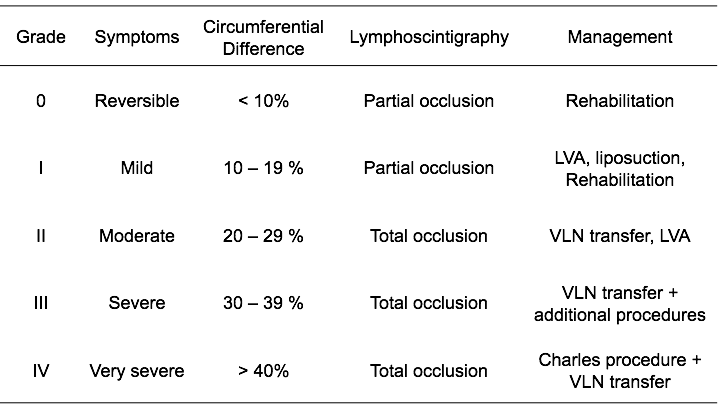
Cheng's Lymphedema Grading

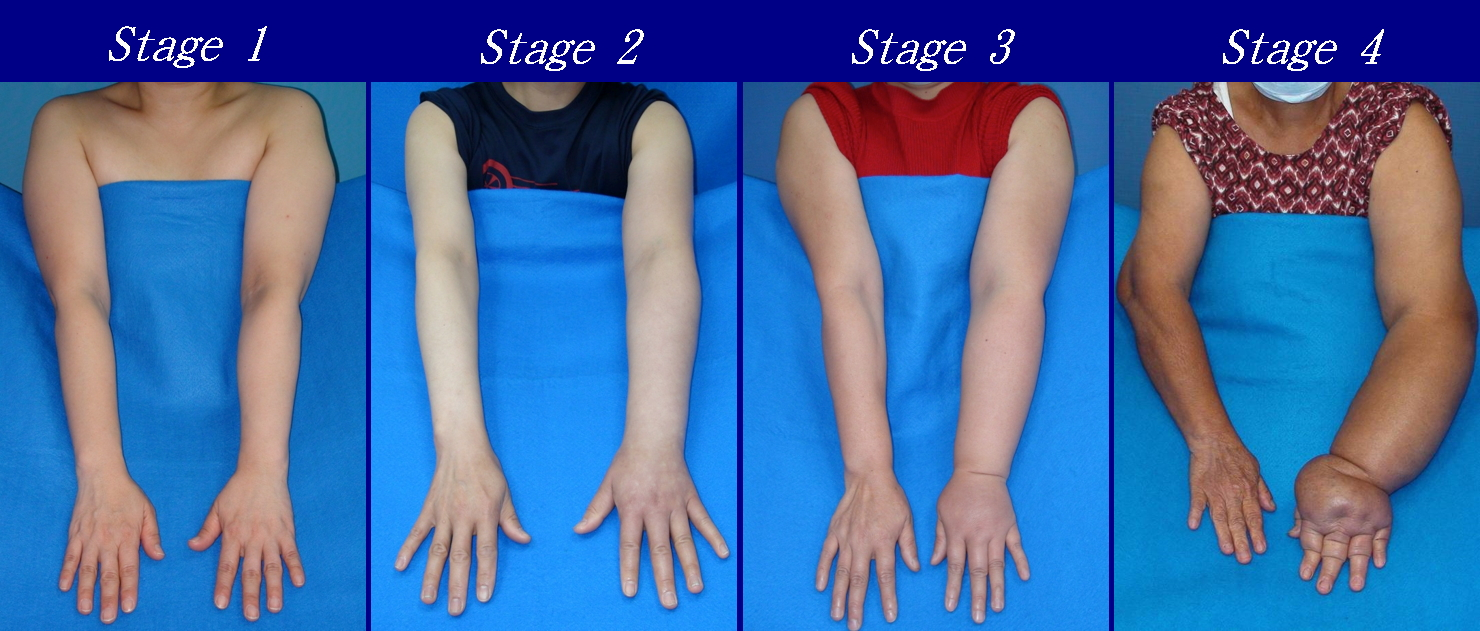
Severity of upper extremity lymphedema in different stages

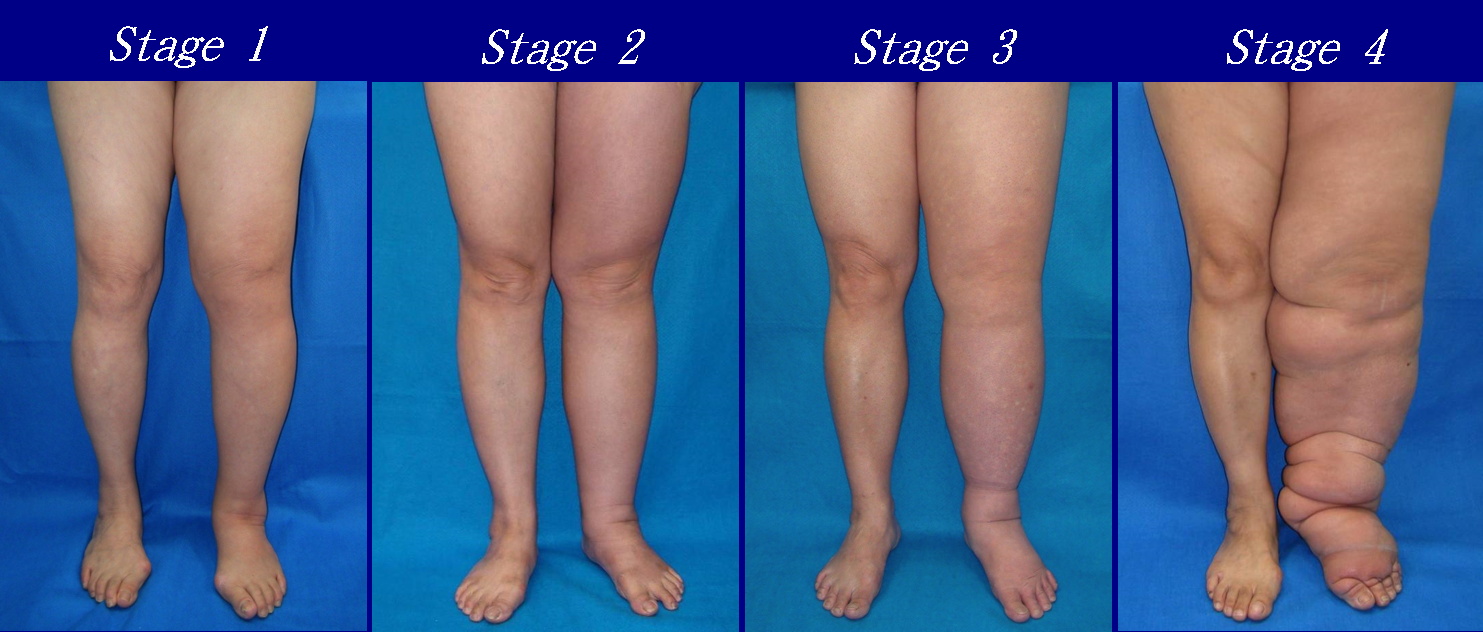
Severity of lower extremity lymphedema in different stages

==== WHO filariasis staging ====
As described by the Fifth WHO Expert Committee on Filariasis, and endorsed by the American Society of Lymphology, the staging system helps to identify the severity of lymphedema. With the assistance of medical imaging, such as MRI or CT, staging can be established by the physician, and therapeutic or medical interventions may be applied:

- Stage 0: The lymphatic vessels have sustained some damage that is not yet apparent. Transport capacity is sufficient for the amount of lymph being removed. Lymphedema is not present.
- Stage 1: Swelling increases during the day and disappears overnight as the patient lies flat in bed. Tissue is still at the pitting stage: when pressed by the fingertips, the affected area indents and reverses with elevation. Usually, upon waking in the morning, the limb or affected area is normal or almost normal in size. Treatment is not necessarily required at this point.
- Stage 2: Swelling is not reversible overnight, and does not disappear without proper management. The tissue now has a spongy consistency and is considered non-pitting: when pressed by the fingertips, the affected area bounces back without indentation. Fibrosis found in Stage 2 lymphedema marks the beginning of the hardening of the limbs and increasing size.
- Stage 3: Swelling is irreversible and usually the limb(s) or affected area becomes increasingly large. The tissue is hard (fibrotic) and unresponsive; some patients consider undergoing reconstructive surgery, called "debulking". This remains controversial, however, since the risks may outweigh the benefits and further damage done to the lymphatic system may make the lymphedema worse.
- Stage 4: The size and circumference of the affected limb(s) become noticeably larger. Bumps, lumps, or protrusions (also called knobs) on the skin begin to appear.
- Stage 5: The affected limb(s) become grossly large; one or more deep skin folds is present.
- Stage 6: Knobs of small elongated or rounded sizes cluster together, giving mossy-like shapes on the limb. Mobility of the patient becomes increasingly impaired.
- Stage 7: The person becomes "handicapped", and is unable to independently perform daily routine activities such as walking, bathing and cooking. Assistance from the family and health care system is needed.

=== Differential ===
Lymphedema should not be confused with edema arising from chronic venous insufficiency, which is caused by compromise of venous drainage rather than lymphatic drainage. However, untreated venous insufficiency can progress into a combined venous/lymphatic disorder known as phlebetic lymphedema (or phlebolymphedema).

== Treatment ==
=== Curative treatment ===
Curative treatment for lymphedema is surgical and relies on supermicrosurgery, which involves performing a lymph node transplant from a healthy donor site to the diseased area.

In simpler cases, a lymphatic-venous shunt allows excess lymph to be drained into adjacent superficial veins.

These treatments are performed by surgeons specializing in microsurgery and result in improvement in 98% of cases.

Complementary treatment may improve outcomes. This commonly include compression therapy, good skin care, exercise, manual lymphatic drainage (MLD) and the use of an intermittent pneumatic compression pump, which together is known as combined decongestive therapy. MLD is most effective in mild to moderate disease. In breast cancer-related lymphedema, MLD is safe and may offer added benefit to compression bandages for reducing swelling. Most people with lymphedema can be medically managed with conservative treatment. Diuretics are not useful. Surgery is generally only used if symptoms are not improved by other measures.

=== Compression ===
==== Garments ====
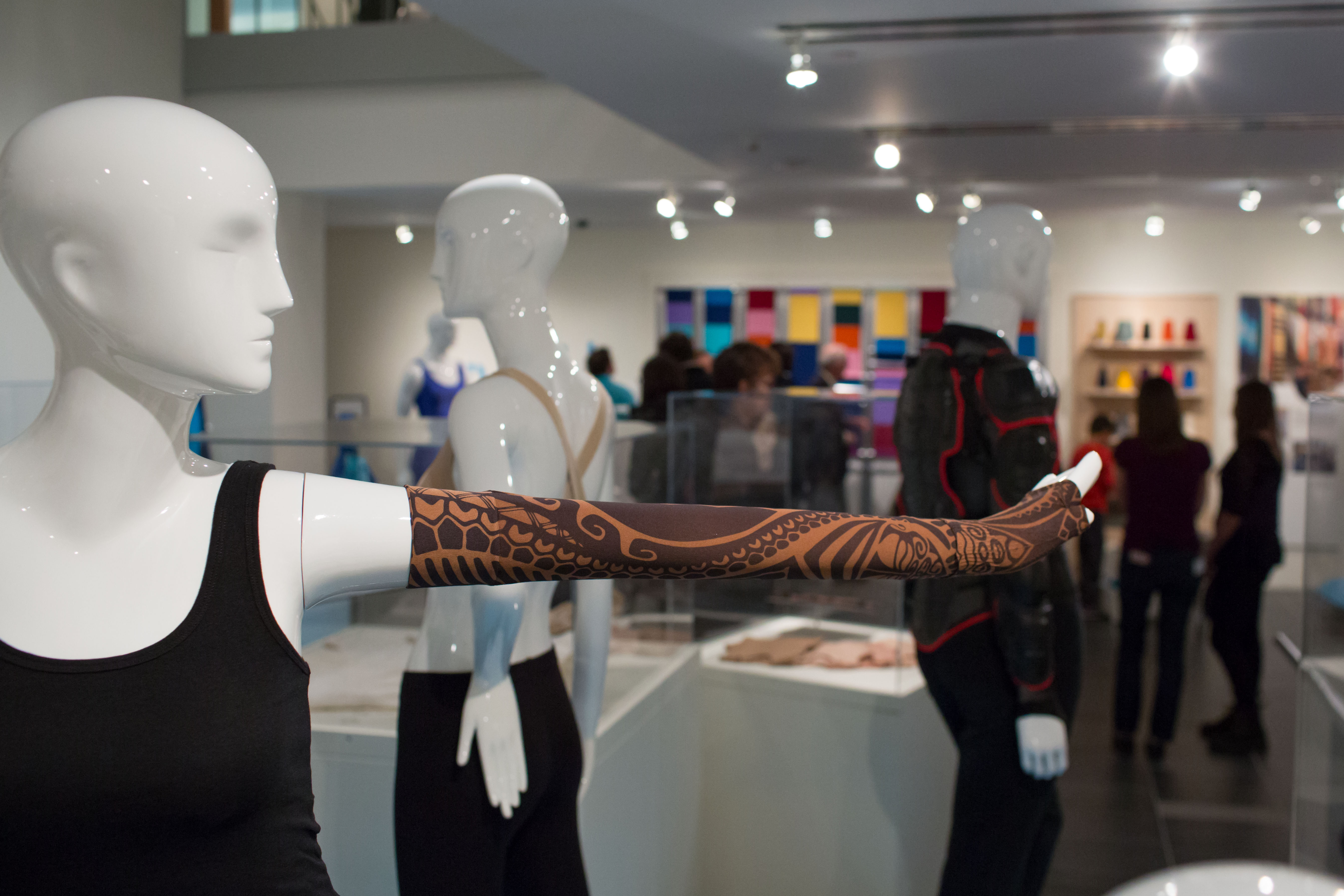
Lymphedema compression sleeve on a mannequin

Once a person is diagnosed with lymphedema, compression becomes imperative in the management of the condition. Garments are often intended to be worn all day but may be taken off for sleep, unless otherwise prescribed. Elastic compression garments are worn on the affected limb following complete de-congestive therapy to maintain edema reduction. Inelastic garments provide containment and reduction. Available styles, options, and prices vary widely. A professional garment fitter or certified lymphedema therapist can help determine the best option for the patient.

==== Bandaging ====
Compression bandaging, also called wrapping, is the application of layers of padding and short-stretch bandages to the involved areas. Short-stretch bandages are preferred over long-stretch bandages (such as those normally used to treat sprains), as the long-stretch bandages cannot produce the proper therapeutic tension necessary to safely reduce lymphedema and may produce a tourniquet effect. Compression bandages provide resistance that assists in pumping fluid out of the affected area during exercise. This counter-force results in increased lymphatic drainage and therefore a decrease in size of the swollen area.

==== Intermittent pneumatic compression therapy ====
Intermittent pneumatic compression therapy (IPC) utilizes a multi-chambered pneumatic sleeve with overlapping cells to promote movement of lymph fluid. Pump therapy should only be used in addition to other treatments such as compression bandaging and manual lymph drainage. Pump therapy has been used in the past to help with controlling lymphedema. In some cases, pump therapy helps soften fibrotic tissue and therefore potentially enable more efficient lymphatic drainage. However, reports link pump therapy to increased incidence of edema proximal to the affected limb, such as genital edema arising after pump therapy in the lower limb. Current literature has suggested the use of IPC treatment in conjunction with an elastic therapeutic tape is more effective in the overall reduction of lymphedema as well as increasing shoulder range of motion than the traditional treatment of IPC paired with complete decongestive therapy. The tape is an elastic cotton strip with an acrylic adhesive that is commonly used to relieve the discomfort and disability associated with sports injuries, but in the context of lymphedema, this increases the space between the dermis and the muscle which increases the opportunity for lymphatic fluid to flow out naturally. The use of IPC treatments with tape, as well as subsequent lymphatic drainage, has proven to significantly reduce the circumference of lymphatic limbs in patients experiencing lymphedema secondary to breast cancer post-mastectomy.

=== Exercise ===
In those with lymphedema or at risk of developing lymphedema, such as following breast cancer treatment, resistance training did not increase swelling and led to decreases in some, in addition to other potential beneficial effects on cardiovascular health. Moreover, resistance training and other forms of exercise were not associated with an increased risk of developing lymphedema in people who previously received breast cancer-related treatment. Compression garments should be worn during exercise.

Physical therapy for patients with lymphedema may include trigger point release, soft tissue massage, postural improvement, patient education on condition management, strengthening, and stretching exercises. Exercises may increase in intensity and difficulty over time, beginning with passive movements to increase range of motion and progressing towards using external weights and resistance in various postures.

=== Surgery ===
The treatment of lymphedema is usually conservative, however the use of surgery is proposed for some cases.

Suction assisted lipectomy (SAL), also known as liposuction for lymphedema, may help improve chronic non pitting edema. The procedure removes fat and protein and is done alongside continued compression therapy. Lymphovenous anastomosis is another similar surgery.

Vascularized lymph node transfers (VLNT) and lymphovenous bypass are supported by tentative evidence as of 2017 but are associated with a number of complications.

=== Laser therapy ===
Low-level laser therapy (LLLT) was cleared by the US Food and Drug Administration (FDA) for the treatment of lymphedema in November 2006. According to the US National Cancer Institute, LLLT may be effective in reducing lymphedema in some women. Two cycles of laser treatment were found to reduce the volume of the affected arm in approximately one-third of people with post-mastectomy lymphedema at three months post-treatment.

=== Pharmaceuticals ===
A new therapeutic approach involving the drug QBX258 has shown promising results in the treatment of lymphedema. Although it did not reach statistical significance, QBX258 treatment modestly decreased periostin expression and the number of CD4+ and CD4+IL4+ cells in lymphoedematous skin. Notably, QBX258 significantly reduced the expression of Th2-inducing cytokines, improving physical and social quality-of-life measures for patients. However, psychological improvements were not observed.

== Epidemiology ==
Lymphedema affects approximately 200 million people worldwide.
