= List of diseases (M) =

This is a list of diseases starting with the letter "M".

== Ma ==
=== Mac ===
- Mac Dermot Patton Williams syndrome
- Mac Dermot Winter syndrome

==== Maci–Macr ====
- Macias–Flores–Garcia–Cruz–Rivera syndrome
- Mackay–Shek–Carr syndrome
- Macrocephaly cutis marmorata telangiectatica
- Macrocephaly dominant type
- Macrocephaly mental retardation facial dysmorphism
- Macrocephaly mesodermal hamartoma spectrum
- Macrocephaly pigmentation large hands feet
- Macrocephaly short stature paraplegia
- Macrodactyly of the foot
- Macrodactyly of the hand
- Macroepiphyseal dysplasia Mcalister Coe type
- Macroglobulinemia
- Macroglossia dominant
- Macroglossia exomphalos gigantism
- Macrogyria pseudobulbar palsy
- Macrophagic myofasciitis
- Macrosomia microphthalmia cleft palate
- Macrothrombocytopenia progressive deafness
- Macrothrombocytopenia with leukocyte inclusions

==== Macu ====
- Macular corneal dystrophy
- Macular degeneration
  - Macular degeneration juvenile
  - Macular degeneration, age-related
  - Macular degeneration, polymorphic
- Macular dystrophy, vitelliform
- Macules hereditary congenital hypopigmented and hyperpigmented

=== Mad–Mak ===
- Mad cow disease
- Madelung's disease
- Madokoro–Ohdo–Sonoda syndrome
- Maffucci syndrome
- Magnesium defect in renal tubular transport of
- Magnesium wasting renal
- Major depressive disorder

=== Mal ===
- Mal de debarquement

==== Mala–Mall ====
- Malakoplakia
- Malaria
- Male pseudohermaphroditism due to 17-beta-hydroxysteroid dehydrogenase deficiency
- Male pseudohermaphroditism due to 5-alpha-reductase 2 deficiency
- Male pseudohermaphroditism due to defective LH molecule
- Malformations in neuronal migration
- Malignant astrocytoma
- Malignant fibrous histiocytoma
- Malignant germ cell tumor
- Malignant hyperthermia arthrogryposis torticollis
- Malignant hyperthermia

- Malignant hyperthermia susceptibility type 1
- Malignant hyperthermia susceptibility type 2
- Malignant hyperthermia susceptibility type 3
- Malignant hyperthermia susceptibility type 4
- Malignant hyperthermia susceptibility type 5
- Malignant hyperthermia susceptibility type 6

- Malignant mesenchymal tumor
- Malignant mixed Müllerian tumor
- Malignant paroxysmal ventricular tachycardia
- Mallory–Weiss syndrome
- Malnutrition

==== Malo–Malp ====
- Malonic aciduria
- Malonyl-CoA decarboxylase deficiency
- Malouf syndrome
- Malpuech facial clefting syndrome

=== Man ===
- Mandibuloacral dysplasia
- Mandibulofacial dysostosis-microcephaly syndrome
- Manic Depression, Bipolar
- Manic-depressive psychosis, genetic types
- Mannosidosis
- Manouvrier syndrome
- Mansonelliasis
- Mantle cell lymphoma

=== Mar ===
==== Mara–Marg ====
- Marburg fever
- Marchiafava–Bignami disease
- Marchiafava–Micheli disease
- Marcus Gunn phenomenon
- Marden–Walker syndrome
- Marek disease
- Marfan syndrome
  - Marfan Syndrome type II
  - Marfan Syndrome type III
  - Marfan Syndrome type IV
  - Marfan Syndrome type V
- Marfan-like syndrome, Boileau type
- Marfan-like syndrome
- Marfanoid craniosynostosis syndrome
- Marfanoid hypermobility
- Marfanoid mental retardation syndrome autosomal
- Marginal glioneuronal heterotopia

==== Mari–Mart ====
- Marie type ataxia
- Marie–Unna congenital hypotrichosis
- Marinesco–Sjögren syndrome
- Markel–Vikkula–Mulliken syndrome
- Marker chromosome 15 syndrome
- Maroteaux–Cohen–Solal–Bonaventure syndrome
- Maroteaux–Fonfria syndrome
- Maroteaux–Stanescu–Cousin syndrome
- Maroteaux–Lamy syndrome
- Marphanoid syndrome type De Silva
- Marsden–Nyhan–Sakati syndrome
- Marsden syndrome
- Marshall syndrome
- Marshall–Smith syndrome
- Martinez–Monasterio–Pinheiro syndrome
- Martsolf syndrome

=== Mas–May ===
- MASA syndrome
- Mass psychogenic illness
- MASS syndrome
- Massa–Casaer–Ceulemans syndrome
- Mast cell disease
- Mastocytosis, short stature, hearing loss
- Mastocytosis
- Mastoiditis
- Mastroiacovo–De Rosa–Satta syndrome
- Mastroiacovo–Gambi–Segni syndrome
- MAT deficiency
- Maternal hyperphenylalaninemia
- Maternally inherited diabetes and deafness
- Mathieu–De Broca–Bony syndrome
- Matsoukas–Liarikos–Giannika syndrome
- Matthew–Wood syndrome
- Maturity onset diabetes of the young
- Maumenee syndrome
- Maxillary double lip
- Maxillofacial dysostosis
- Maxillonasal dysplasia, Binder type
- Mayer–Rokitanski–Kuster syndrome
- May–Hegglin anomaly

== Mc ==
- McAlister–Crane syndrome
- McArdle disease
- McCallum–Macadam–Johnston syndrome
- McCune–Albright syndrome
- McDonough syndrome
- McDowall syndrome
- McGillivray syndrome
- McKusick–Kaufman syndrome
- McKusick type metaphyseal chondrodysplasia
- McLain–Debakian syndrome
- McPherson–Clemens syndrome
- McPherson–Robertson–Cammarano syndrome

== Me ==
=== Mea–Med ===
- Meacham–Winn–Culler syndrome
- Meadows syndrome, names for:
  - Munchausen syndrome by proxy
  - Peripartum cardiomyopathy
- Measles
- Meckel like syndrome
- Meckel syndrome
- Medeira Dennis Donnai syndrome
- Median cleft lip corpus callosum lipoma skin polyps
- Median nodule of the upper lip
- Mediastinal endodermal sinus tumors
- Mediastinal syndrome
- Mediterranean fever
- Medium-chain Acyl-CoA dehydrogenase deficiency
- Medrano Roldan syndrome
- Medullary cystic disease
- Medullary thyroid carcinoma
- Medulloblastoma

=== Meg–Mei ===
- Megacystis microcolon intestinal hypoperistalsis syndrome
- Megaduodenum
- Mega-epiphyseal dwarfism
- Megalencephalic leukodystrophy
- Megalencephaly-cystic leukodystrophy
- Megaloblastic anemia
- Megalocornea mental retardation syndrome
- Megalocytic interstitial nephritis
- Mehes syndrome
- Mehta–Lewis–Patton syndrome
- Meier–Blumberg–Imahorn syndrome
- Meier–Rotschild syndrome
- Meige syndrome
- Meigel disease
- Meinecke–Pepper syndrome
- Meinecke syndrome

=== Mel–Mem ===
- Melanoma type 1
- Melanoma type 2
- Melanoma, familial
- Melanoma, malignant
- Melanoma-astrocytoma syndrome
- Melanosis neurocutaneous
- MELAS
- Meleda disease
- Melhem–Fahl syndrome
- Melioidosis
- Melkersson–Rosenthal syndrome
- Melnick–Needles osteodysplasty
- Melnick–Needles syndrome
- Membranoproliferative glomerulonephritis (type II)

=== Men ===
==== Mend–Meno ====
- Mendelian susceptibility to atypical mycobacteria
- Menetrier's disease
- Mengel–Konigsmark syndrome
- Ménière's disease
- Meningeal angiomatosis cleft hypoplastic left heart
- Meningioma 1
- Meningioma
- Meningitis, meningococcal
- Meningitis
- Meningocele
- Meningococcemia
- Meningoencephalocele
- Meningoencephalocele-arthrogryposis-hypoplastic thumb
- Meningomyelocele
- Menopause

==== Ment ====
===== Menta =====
====== Mental ======
Mental d – Mental m

- Mental deficiency-epilepsy-endocrine disorders
- Mental mixed retardation deafness clubbed digits

Mental r

- Mental retardation

Mental retardation a – Mental retardation m

- Mental retardation anophthalmia craniosynostosis
- Mental retardation arachnodactyly hypotonia telangiectasia
- Mental retardation athetosis microphthalmia
- Mental retardation blepharophimosis obesity web neck
- Mental retardation Buenos Aires type
- Mental retardation cataracts calcified pinnae myopathy
- Mental retardation coloboma slimness
- Mental retardation contractural arachnodactyly
- Mental retardation dysmorphism hypogonadism diabetes
- Mental retardation epilepsy bulbous nose
- Mental retardation epilepsy
- Mental retardation gynecomastia obesity X linked
- Mental retardation hip luxation G6PD variant
- Mental retardation hypocupremia hypobetalipoproteinemia
- Mental retardation hypotonia skin hyperpigmentation
- Mental retardation macrocephaly coarse facies hypotonia
- Mental retardation microcephaly phalangeal facial
- Mental retardation microcephaly unusual facies
- Mental retardation Mietens–Weber type
- Mental retardation multiple nevi
- Mental retardation myopathy short stature endocrine defect
- Mental retardation nasal hypoplasia obesity genital hypoplasia

Mental retardation n – Mental retardation s

- Mental retardation nasal papillomata
- Mental retardation osteosclerosis
- Mental retardation progressive spasticity
- Mental retardation psychosis macroorchidism
- Mental retardation short broad thumbs
- Mental retardation short stature absent phalanges
- Mental retardation short stature Bombay phenotype
- Mental retardation short stature cleft palate unusual facies
- Mental retardation short stature deafness genital
- Mental retardation short stature hand contractures genital anomalies
- Mental retardation short stature heart and skeletal anomalies
- Mental retardation short stature hypertelorism
- Mental retardation short stature microcephaly eye
- Mental retardation short stature ocular and articular anomalies
- Mental retardation short stature scoliosis
- Mental retardation short stature unusual facies
- Mental retardation short stature wedge shaped epiphyses
- Mental retardation skeletal dysplasia abducens palsy
- Mental retardation Smith–Fineman–Myers type
- Mental retardation spasticity ectrodactyly

Mental retardation u – Mental retardation x

- Mental retardation unusual facies Ampola type
- Mental retardation unusual facies Davis–Lafer type
- Mental retardation unusual facies talipes hand anomalies
- Mental retardation unusual facies
- Mental retardation Wolff type
- Mental retardation X linked Atkin type
- Mental retardation X linked borderline Maoa metabolism anomaly
- Mental retardation X linked Brunner type
- Mental retardation X linked dysmorphism
- Mental retardation X linked dystonia dysarthria
- Mental retardation X linked severe Gustavson type
- Mental retardation X linked short stature obesity
- Mental retardation X linked Tranebjaerg type seizures psoriasis
- Mental retardation, unexplained
- Mental retardation, X linked, Marfanoid habitus
- Mental retardation, X linked, nonspecific
- Mental retardation, X-linked 14
- Mental retardation-polydactyly-uncombable hair

=== Mer–Mes ===
- Mercury poisoning (Mercurialism)
- Meretoja syndrome
- Merkle tumors
- Merlob–Grunebaum–Reisner syndrome
- Merlob syndrome
- Mesangial sclerosis, diffuse
- Mesenteric ischemia
- Mesenteric panniculitis
- Mesodermal defects lower type
- Mesomelia synostoses
- Mesomelia
- Mesomelic dwarfism cleft palate camptodactyly
- Mesomelic dwarfism Langer type
- Mesomelic dwarfism Nievergelt type
- Mesomelic dwarfism Reinhardt–Pfeiffer type
- Mesomelic dysplasia skin dimples
- Mesomelic dysplasia Thai type
- Mesomelic syndrome Pfeiffer type
- Mesothelioma

=== Met ===
==== Meta ====
- Metabolic acidosis
- Metabolic disorder
- Metabolic syndrome X
- Metacarpals 4 and 5 fusion
- Metachondromatosis
- Metageria
- Metaphyseal anadysplasia
- Metaphyseal chondrodysplasia Schmid type
- Metaphyseal chondrodysplasia Spahr type
- Metaphyseal chondrodysplasia, others
- Metaphyseal dysostosis mental retardation conductive deafness
- Metaphyseal dysplasia maxillary hypoplasia brachydactyly
- Metaphyseal dysplasia Pyle type
- Metastatic Insulinoma
- Metatarsus adductus
- Metatropic dwarfism
- Metatropic dysplasia

==== Meth ====
- Methimazole antenatal infection
- Methionine adenosyltransferase deficiency
- Methyl mercury antenatal infection
- Methylcobalamin deficiency cbl G type
- Methylcobalamin deficiency, cbl E complementation type
- Methylenetetrahydrofolate reductase deficiency
- Methylmalonic acidemia with homocystinuria
- Methylmalonic acidemia
- Methylmalonic aciduria microcephaly cataract
- Methylmalonicacidemia with homocystinuria, cbl D
- Methylmalonicaciduria with homocystinuria, cbl F
- Methylmalonicaciduria, vitamin B12 unresponsive, mut-0
- Methylmalonyl-Coenzyme A mutase deficiency
- Methemoglobinemia

=== Mev–Mey ===
- Mevalonate kinase deficiency
- Mevalonicaciduria
- Meyenburg–Altherr–Uehlinger syndrome

== Mi ==
=== Mib ===
- Mibies syndrome

=== Mic ===
==== Mich–Mick ====
- Michelin tire baby syndrome
- Michels Caskey syndrome
- Michels syndrome
- Mickleson syndrome

==== Micr ====
===== Mircre =====
- Micrencephaly corpus callosum agenesis
- Micrencephaly olivopontocerebellar hypoplasia

===== Micro =====
- Micro syndrome

====== Microb ======
- Microbrachycephaly ptosis cleft lip

====== Microc ======
Microcephalic

- Microcephalic osteodysplastic primordial dwarfism
- Microcephalic primordial dwarfism Toriello type
- Microcephalic primordial dwarfism

Microcephaly

- Microcephaly

Microcephaly a – Microcephaly l

- Microcephaly albinism digital anomalies syndrome
- Microcephaly autosomal dominant
- Microcephaly brachydactyly kyphoscoliosis
- Microcephaly brain defect spasticity hypernatremia
- Microcephaly cardiac defect lung malsegmentation
- Microcephaly cardiomyopathy
- Microcephaly cervical spine fusion anomalies
- Microcephaly chorioretinopathy recessive form
- Microcephaly cleft palate autosomal dominant
- Microcephaly deafness syndrome
- Microcephaly developmental delay pancytopenia
- Microcephaly facial clefting preaxial polydactyly
- Microcephaly glomerulonephritis Marfanoid habitus
- Microcephaly hiatus hernia nephrotic syndrome
- Microcephaly hypergonadotropic hypogonadism short stature
- Microcephaly immunodeficiency lymphoreticuloma
- Microcephaly intracranial calcification
- Microcephaly lymphoedema chorioretinal dysplasia
- Microcephaly lymphoedema syndrome

Microcephaly m – Microcephaly w

- Microcephaly mental retardation retinopathy
- Microcephaly mental retardation spasticity epilepsy
- Microcephaly mesobrachyphalangy tracheoesophageal fistula syndrome
- Microcephaly microcornea syndrome Seemanova type
- Microcephaly micropenis convulsions
- Microcephaly microphthalmos blindness
- Microcephaly nonsyndromal
- Microcephaly pontocerebellar hypoplasia dyskinesia
- Microcephaly seizures mental retardation heart disorders
- Microcephaly sparse hair mental retardation seizures
- Microcephaly syndactyly brachymesophalangy
- Microcephaly with chorioretinopathy, autosomal dominant form
- Microcephaly with normal intelligence, immunodeficiency
- Microcephaly with spastic qriplegia
- Microcephaly, holoprosencephaly, and intrauterine growth retardation
- Microcephaly, primary autosomal recessive

Microco

- Microcoria, congenital
- Microcornea correctopia macular hypoplasia
- Microcornea glaucoma absent frontal sinuses

====== Microd – Microv ======
- Microdontia hypodontia short stature
- Microencephaly
- Microgastria limb reduction defect
- Microgastria short stature diabetes
- Microinfarct
- Micromelic dwarfism Fryns type
- Micromelic dysplasia dislocation of radius
- Microphtalmos bilateral colobomatous orbital cyst
- Microphthalmia
- Microphthalmia, Lentz type
- Microphthalmia camptodactyly mental retardation
- Microphthalmia cataract
- Microphthalmia diaphragmatic hernia Fallot
- Microphthalmia mental deficiency
- Microphthalmia microtia fetal akinesia
- Microphthalmia with limb anomalies
- Microphthalmos, microcornea, and sclerocornea
- Microscopic polyangiitis
- Microsomia hemifacial radial defects
- Microspherophakia metaphyseal dysplasia
- Microsporidiosis
- Microtia, meatal atresia and conductive deafness
- Microvillus inclusion disease

==== Micu ====
- Miculicz syndrome

=== Mid–Mir ===
- MIDAS syndrome
- Midline cleft of lower lip
- Midline defects autosomal type
- Midline defects recessive type
- Midline developmental field defects
- Midline field defects
- Midline lethal granuloma
- Mietens syndrome
- Mievis–Verellen–Dumoulin syndrome
- Migraine
- Mikulicz syndrome
- Mild cognitive impairment
- Miller Fisher syndrome
- Miller–Dieker syndrome
- Milner–Khallouf–Gibson syndrome
- MILS syndrome
- Minamata disease
- Minkowski–Chauffard syndrome
- Minoxidil antenatal infection
- Miosis, congenital
- Mirhosseini–Holmes–Walton syndrome
- Mirror hands feet nasal defects
- Mirror polydactyly segmentation and limbs defects

=== Mis–Mix ===
- Miscarriage
- Mitochondrial cytopathy (generic term)
- Mitochondrial diseases of nuclear origin
- Mitochondrial diseases, clinically undefinite
- Mitochondrial disease
- Mitochondrial encephalomyopathy aminoacidopathy
- Mitochondrial genetic disorders
- Mitochondrial myopathy lactic acidosis
- Mitochondrial myopathy-encephalopathy-lactic acidosis
- Mitochondrial PEPCK deficiency
- Mitochondrial trifunctional protein deficiency
- Mitral atresia
- Mitral regurgitation deafness skeletal anomalies
- Mitral valve prolapse, familial, autosomal dominant
- Mitral valve prolapse, familial, X linked
- Mitral valve prolapse
- Miura syndrome
- Mixed connective tissue disease
- Mixed Müllerian tumor
- Mixed receptive-expressive language disorder
- Mixed sclerosing bone dystrophy

== Ml–Mn ==
- MLS syndrome
- MMEP syndrome
- MMT syndrome
- MN1
- MNGIE syndrome

== Mo ==
=== Mob–Mom ===
- Möbius syndrome
- MODY syndrome
- Möbius axonal neuropathy hypogonadism
- Moerman Van den berghe Fryns syndrome
- Moeschler–Clarren syndrome
- Mohr syndrome
- Mohr–Tranebjærg syndrome
- Mollica–Pavone–Antener syndrome
- Molluscum contagiosum
- Moloney syndrome
- Molybdenum cofactor deficiency
- MOMO syndrome

=== Mon–Moo ===
- Mondini dysplasia
- Mondor's disease
- Monge's disease
- Monilethrix
- Monoamine oxidase A deficiency
- Monoclonal gammopathy of undetermined significance
- Monodactyly tetramelic
- Mononen–Karnes–Senac syndrome
- Mononeuritis multiplex
- Monosomy 8q12 21
- Monosomy 8q21 q22
- Monosomy X
- Montefiore syndrome
- Moore–Federman syndrome
- Moore–Smith–Weaver syndrome

=== Mor–Moy ===
- Morel's ear
- Moreno–Zachai–Kaufman syndrome
- Morgani–Turner–Albright syndrome
- Morillo–Cucci–Passarge syndrome
- Morphea scleroderma
- Morphea, generalized
- Morquio disease, type A
- Morquio disease, type B
- Morquio syndrome
- Morrison–Young syndrome
- Morse–Rawnsley–Sargent syndrome
- Motor neuron disease
- Motor neuro-ophthalmic disorders
- Motor neuropathy peripheral dysautonomia
- Motor neuropathy
- Motor sensory neuropathy type 1 aplasia cutis congenita
- Mounier-Kuhn syndrome
- Mount–Reback syndrome
- Mousa Al din Al Nassar syndrome
- Mouth cancer
- Mouth ulcer
- Moyamoya disease

== Mp–Mt ==
- MPO deficiency
- MPS III-A
- MPS III-B
- MPS III-C
- MPS III-D
- MPS VI
- MRKH Syndrome (Müllerian agenesis)
- MSBD syndrome
- MTHFR deficiency

== Mu ==
=== Muc–Mue ===
- Mucha–Habermann disease
- Muckle–Wells syndrome
- Mucoepithelial dysplasia
- Mucolipidosis type 1
- Mucolipidosis type 3
- Mucolipidosis type 4
- Mucopolysaccharidosis type 3
- Mucopolysaccharidosis type 4
- Mucopolysaccharidosis type I Hurler syndrome
- Mucopolysaccharidosis type I Hurler/Scheie syndrome
- Mucopolysaccharidosis type I Scheie syndrome
- Mucopolysaccharidosis type II Hunter syndrome- mild form
- Mucopolysaccharidosis type II Hunter syndrome- severe form
- Mucopolysaccharidosis type IV-A Morquio syndrome
- Mucopolysaccharidosis type IV-B
- Mucopolysaccharidosis type V
- Mucopolysaccharidosis type VI Maroteaux-Lamy - severe, intermediate
- Mucopolysaccharidosis type VII Sly syndrome
- Mucopolysaccharidosis
- Mucormycosis
- Mucosulfatidosis
- Muenke syndrome

=== Mul ===
==== Muli–Mull ====
- Mulibrey nanism
- Müller–Barth–Menger syndrome
- Müllerian agenesis
- Müllerian aplasia
- Müllerian derivatives lymphangiectasia polydactyly
- Müllerian derivatives, persistent
- Müllerian duct abnormalities galactosemia
- Mulliez–Roux–Loterman syndrome

==== Mult ====
===== Multi =====
====== Multic–Multin ======
- Multicentric osteolysis nephropathy
- Multicentric reticulohistiocytosis
- Multifocal heterotopia
- Multifocal motor neuropathy
- Multifocal ventricular premature beats
- Multi-infarct dementia
- Multinodular goiter cystic kidney polydactyly

====== Multip ======
Multiple a – Multiple p

- Multiple acyl-CoA deficiency
- Multiple carboxylase deficiency, biotin responsive
- Multiple carboxylase deficiency, late onset
- Multiple carboxylase deficiency, propionic acidemia
- Multiple chemical sensitivity
- Multiple congenital anomalies mental retardation, growth failure and cleft lip palate
- Multiple congenital contractures
- Multiple contracture syndrome Finnish type
- Multiple endocrine neoplasia type 1
- Multiple endocrine neoplasia, type 2
- Multiple fibrofolliculoma familial
- Multiple hereditary exostoses
- Multiple joint dislocations metaphyseal dysplasia
- Multiple myeloma
- Multiple organ failure
- Multiple pterygium syndrome lethal type
- Multiple pterygium syndrome

Multiple s – Multiple v

- Multiple sclerosis ichthyosis factor VIII deficiency
- Multiple sclerosis
- Multiple subcutaneous angiolipomas
- Multiple sulfatase deficiency
- Multiple synostoses syndrome 1
- Multiple system atrophy
- Multiple vertebral anomalies unusual facies

=== Mum–Mut ===
- Mumps
- Münchausen syndrome
- Münchausen syndrome by proxy
- Muscle-eye-brain syndrome
- Muscular atrophy ataxia retinitis pigmentosa diabetes mellitus
- Muscular dystrophy congenital infantile cataract hypogonadism
- Muscular dystrophy congenital, merosin negative
- Muscular dystrophy, facioscapulohumeral
- Muscular dystrophy Hutterite type
- Muscular dystrophy limb girdle type 2A, Erb type
- Muscular dystrophy limb-girdle autosomal dominant
- Muscular dystrophy limb-girdle type 2B, Myoshi type
- Muscular dystrophy limb-girdle with beta-sarcoglycan deficiency
- Muscular dystrophy limb-girdle with delta-sarcoglyan deficiency
- Muscular dystrophy white matter spongiosis
- Muscular dystrophy, congenital, merosin-positive
- Muscular dystrophy, Duchenne and Becker type
- Muscular dystrophy
- Muscular fibrosis multifocal obstructed vessels
- Muscular phosphorylase kinase deficiency
- Mutations in estradiol receptor

== My ==
=== Mya–Myc ===
- Myalgia eosinophilia associated with tryptophan
- Myalgic encephalomyelitis
- Myasthenia gravis congenital
- Myasthenia gravis
- Myasthenia, familial
- Mycobacterium avium complex infection
- Mycoplasmal pneumonia
- Mycosis fungoides lymphoma
- Mycosis fungoides, familial
- Mycosis fungoides
- Mycositis fungoides

=== Mye–Myi ===
- Myelinopathy
- Myelitis
- Myelocerebellar disorder
- Myelodysplasia
- Myelodysplastic syndromes
- Myelofibrosis, idiopathic
- Myelofibrosis
- Myelofibrosis-osteosclerosis
- Myeloperoxidase deficiency
- Myhre–Ruvalcaba–Graham syndrome
- Myhre–Ruvalcaba–Kelley syndrome
- Myhre syndrome
- Myiasis

=== Myo ===
==== Myoa–Myon ====
- Myoadenylate deaminase deficiency
- Myocarditis
- Myocardium disorder
- Myoclonic dystonia
- Myoclonic epilepsy
- Myoclonic epilepsy with ragged red fibres (MERRF syndrome)
- Myoclonic progressive familial epilepsy
- Myoclonus ataxia
- Myoclonus epilepsy partial seizure
- Myoclonus hereditary progressive distal muscular atrophy
- Myoclonus progressive epilepsy of Unverricht and Lundborg
- Myoclonus
- Myofibrillar lysis
- Myofibrillar myopathy
- Myofibroblastic tumors
- Myoglobinuria dominant form
- Myoglobinuria recurrent
- Myoglobinuria
- Myokymia
- Myoneurogastrointestinal encephalopathy syndrome

==== Myop ====
- Myopathy and diabetes mellitus
- Myopathy congenital multicore with external ophthalmoplegia
- Myopathy growth and mental retardation hypospadias
- Myopathy Hutterite type
- Myopathy mitochondrial cataract
- Myopathy Moebius Robin syndrome
- Myopathy ophthalmoplegia hypoacousia areflexia
- Myopathy tubular aggregates
- Myopathy with lactic acidosis and sideroblastic anemia
- Myopathy, centronuclear
- Myopathy, desmin storage
- Myopathy, McArdle type
- Myopathy, myotubular
- Myopathy, X-linked, with excessive autophagy
- Myopathy
- Myophosphorylase deficiency
- Myopia
- Myopia, infantile severe
- Myopia, severe

==== Myor–Myot ====
- Myorhythmia
- Myositis ossificans post-traumatic
- Myositis ossificans progressiva
- Myositis ossificans
- Myositis, inclusion body
- Myositis
- Myotonia atrophica
- Myotonia mental retardation skeletal anomalies
- Myotubular myopathy

=== Myx ===
- Myxedema
- Myxoid liposarcoma
- Myxoma-spotty pigmentation-endocrine overactivity
- Myxomatous peritonitis
- Myxozoa
