= Madelung's deformity =

Type of malformation of the wrist bones

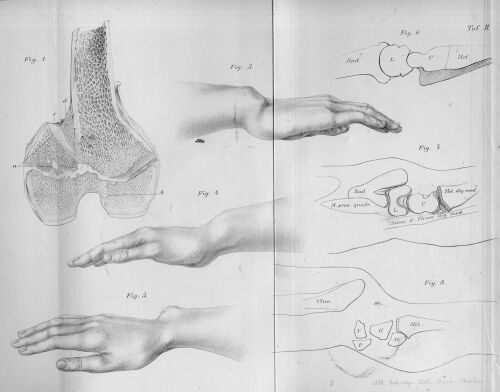
- Madelung deformation, a type of bone malformation associated with both SHOX and SHOXY genes mutations.
- Specialty: Medical genetics

Madelung's deformity is usually characterized by malformed wrists and wrist bones and is often associated with Léri-Weill dyschondrosteosis. It can be bilateral (in both wrists) or just in the one wrist. It has only been recognized within the past hundred years. Named after Otto Wilhelm Madelung (1846–1926), a German surgeon, who described it in detail, it was noted by others. Guillaume Dupuytren mentioned it in 1834, Auguste Nélaton in 1847, and Joseph-François Malgaigne in 1855.

== Signs and symptoms ==
It is a congenital subluxation or dislocation of the ulna's distal end, due to malformation of the bones. Sometimes, minor abnormalities of other bone structures, often caused by disease or injury, such as a fracture of the distal end of the radius with upward displacement of the distal fragment. The deformity varies in degree from a slight protrusion of the lower end of the ulna, to complete dislocation of the inferior radio-ulnar joint with marked ulnar deviation of the hand. Severe deformities are associated with congenital absence or hypoplasia of the radius.

The male:female rate of this disorder is 1:4. The incidence is unknown, and there is no described racial predominance. Even though Madelung's Deformity is considered a congenital disorder, symptoms sometimes aren't seen until adulthood. In most cases, symptoms find their onset during midchildhood. At this age, the relatively slower growth of the ulnar and palmar part of the radius, leads to an increasingly progressive deformity. Pain and deformity are the main symptoms patients present with. Typical clinical presentation consists of a short forearm, anterior-ulnar bow of the radius and a forward subluxation of the hand on the forearm. As mentioned before, the severity of the disorder varies greatly, which also leads to a spectrum of presentation.

== Genetics ==
Leri-Weill dyschondrosteosis is a pseudoautosomal dominant disorder which occurs more frequently in females and is due to a mutation, deletion or duplication of the SHOX gene. The SHOX gene plays a particularly important role in the growth and maturation of bones in the arms and legs. The SHOX gene is located within band Xp22.3 of the pseudoautosomal region of the X chromosome, which escapes X-inactivation. Homozygous SHOX gene mutations result in Langer mesomelic dysplasia.

== Pathogenesis ==
Madelung deformity of the wrist is caused by a growth disturbance in the inferior volar part of the epiphysial growth plate in the distal radius, resulting in a volar placed slope of the lunate facet and scaphoid facet. This produces volar translation of the hand and wrist. The ulna continues growing straight, resulting in a dorsally prominent distal ulna. It occurs predominantly in adolescent females, who present with pain, decreased range of motion, and deformity. It often has a genetic cause and is associated with mesomelic dwarfism and a mutation on the X chromosome. Attempts can be made to treat the deformity surgically by addressing the deforming bone and fibrous bands called "Vickers ligament". This is an abnormal ligament formed between the lunate bone of the wrist and the radius and is found in 91% of cases of Madelung's deformity.

== Diagnosis ==
Diagnosis is normally confirmed by X-rays.

== Treatment ==
=== Non-surgical ===
First options for treatment are conservative, using hot or cold packs, rest and NSAID's at first. If no improvement is made, a splint or brace can be used to keep the deviated arm straight. When none of the conservative treatments work surgical intervention is designated.

=== Surgical ===
==== Pediatrics ====
Physiolysis

Purpose of the treatment is the removal of the epiphysis that causes the abnormal growth of the wrist. This is done by making a small incision at the volar-radial side. This approach passes the Flexor pollicis longus and Palmaris longus and leaves the Median nerve and Radial artery protected. Then the Pronator quadratus muscle is found and detached from the radius. Here a cut into the bone will find the abnormal epiphysis. When the epiphysis is clearly defined more bone is removed so the radius is in its normal position and prevents a new bone bar from forming. This is the end of the physiolisis. This is always combined with a Vickers Ligament release.

Dome osteotomy

The purpose of this treatment option is to straighten the abnormal radius. To do this, an 8 cm incision is made from the wrist crease at the palmar radial side. The approach is made passing the Flexor carpi radialis with detachment of the Pronator quadratus muscle from the radius. Now the Vickers ligament release is done. After this the periosteum is elevated and a crescent-shaped osteotomy, concave at the end, is marked on the bone. Now the radius is cut dome shaped and straightened. The distal end of the radius stays attached to the ulna. The dome shape of the osteotomy allows adequate bony contact for stability and a subperiosteal void for rapid healing.

Vickers Ligament Release

This ligament causes the wrist to deform even more. The purpose of this release is to release the tension and leave the wrist straight in further growth. In both physiolysis and dome osteotomy there should be a clear view of the abnormal.

==== Adults ====
Ulna reduction

Adults with Madelung’s deformity may suffer from ulnar-sided wrist pain. Madelung's Deformity is usually treated by treating the distal radial deformity. However, if patients have a positive ulnar variance and focal wrist pathology, it’s possible to treat with an isolated ulnar-shortening osteotomy. In these patients the radial deformity is not treated.

The ulna is approached from the subcutaneous border. A plate is attached to the distal end of the ulna, to plan the osteotomy. An oblique segment is removed from the ulna, after which the distal radial-ulnar joint is freed, making sure structures stay attached to the styloid process. After this, the freed distal end is reattached to the proximal ulna with the formerly mentioned plate.

Total DRUJ replacement

An alternative treatment for patients with ulnar-sided wristpain is a total replacement of the distal radial-ulnar joint. There are many surgical treatments of the condition, but most of these only improve the alignment and function of the radiocarpal joint. A persistent problem in these treatments has been the stiff DRUJ. However, a prosthesis helps in managing the pain, and might also improve the range of motion of the wrist.

The procedure consists of making a hockey-stick shaped incision along the ulnar border. This incision is made between the fifth and sixth dorsal compartment. Being careful not to harm any essential structures, like the posterior interosseous nerve, the incision is continued between the extensor carpi ulnaris and the extensor digiti quinti, until the ulna is found. The ulnar head is then removed. A guide wire is then inserted in the medullary canal of the ulna, allowing centralization for a cannulated drill bit. A poly-ethylene ball, which will serve as the prosthesis, is then placed over the distal peg. After confirming full range of motion, the skin will be closed.

Dome Osteotomy

In case of Madelung's Deformity in conjunction with radial pain, a dome osteotomy may be conducted. For more information about this procedure, please refer to the treatment of Madelung's Deformity in children.

== Eponym ==
It is named for Otto Wilhelm Madelung.
