= Leri =

Leri may refer to:

== People ==
=== Given name ===
Leri is a common given name in Georgia (country) (Georgian: ლერი)

- Leri Abuladze (born 1999), Georgian wrestler
- Leri Gogoladze (born 1938), Georgian water polo player, mathematics professor
- Leri Kenchadze (born 1986), Georgian figure skater and coach
- Leri Khabelov (born 1964), Georgian wrestler and politician

=== Surname ===
- André Léri (1875–1930), French neurologist
- Annarosa Leri, doctor and scientist at Harvard who fabricated research

== Other meanings ==
- Afon Leri, a river in Wales

== See also ==
- Léri–Weill dyschondrosteosis, rare genetic disorder resulting in short limbs etc.
- Leri pleonosteosis, rare rheumatic condition (unusual facial features, hand/feet abnormalities, or other malformations)
- Léry (disambiguation)
