= Corneal-cerebellar syndrome =

- Other names: Der Kaloustian-Jarudi-Khoury syndrome, corneal dystrophy with spinocebellar degeneration and spinocerebellar degeneration-corneal dystrophy syndrome
- Corneal-cerebellar syndrome is inherited in an autosomal recessive manner

Corneal-cerebellar syndrome (also known as Der Kaloustian-Jarudi-Khoury syndrome) is an autosomally recessive disease that was first described in 1985. Three cases are known: all are sisters in the same family.

== Symptoms and signs ==
The age of onset is in a child's infancy. Bilateral corneal opacification started in the second year of life and led to severe visual impairment. However, cornea surgery and replacement resulted in better vision.

Symptoms include a combination of spinocerebellar degeneration and corneal dystrophy. Intellectual disability and slowly progressive cerebellar abnormalities were also diagnosed in patients. Other symptoms include corneal edema, thickening of Descemet membrane, and degenerative pannus. Abnormalities were found in muscle and sural nerves.

== Diagnosis ==
=== Differential diagnosis ===
It was concluded by Mousa-Al et al. that the disease is different from a disease known as spastic ataxia-corneal dystrophy syndrome that had been found a year later in 1986 in an inbred Bedouin family. Corneal-cerebellar syndrome differs from the spastic ataxia-corneal dystrophy syndrome by causing intellectual disability. Corneal dystrophy is also epithelian instead of being stromal.

== See also ==
- Rare disease
