= McDonough syndrome =

- Other names: Mental retardation, peculiar facies, kyphoscoliosis, diastasis recti, cryptorchidism, and congenital heart defect
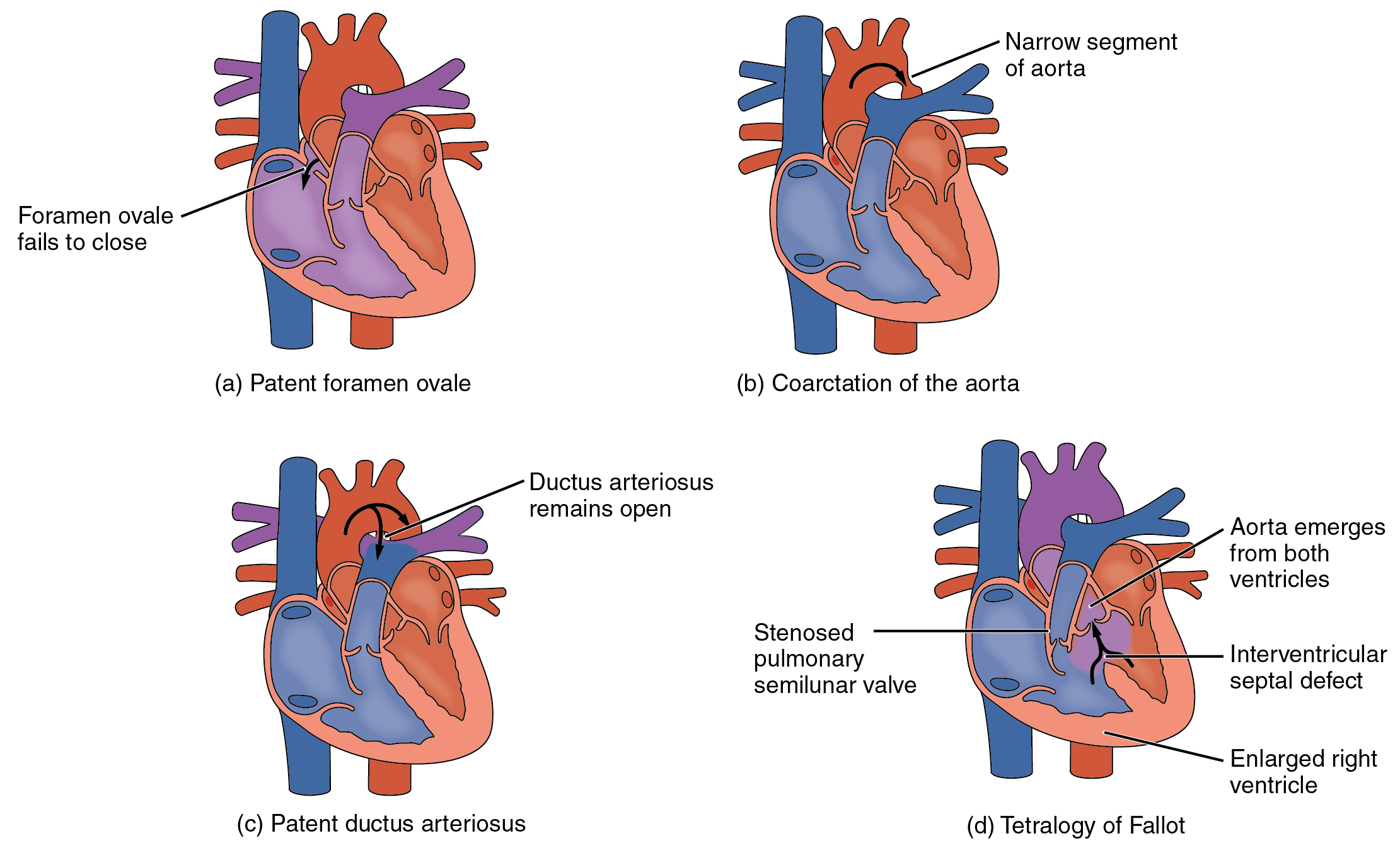
- Specialty: Medical genetics
- Symptoms: facial dysmorphisms, psychomotor delays, intellectual disabilities, and congenital heart defects
- Usual onset: Conception
- Duration: Lifelong
- Prevention: none
- Prognosis: Ok
- Frequency: very rare, only 6 cases from three families in the U.S., Spain and India have been described in medical literature
- Deaths: -

McDonough syndrome, also known as Intellectual disability, peculiar facies, kyphoscoliosis, diastasis recti, cryptorchidism, and congenital heart defect is a very rare multi-systemic genetic disorder which is characterized by facial dysmorphisms, psychomotor delays, intellectual disabilities, and congenital heart defects. Additional findings include either pectus excavatum or pectus carinatum, kyphoscoliosis, diastasis recti and cryptorchidism.

== Signs and symptoms ==
The following is a list of the symptoms individuals with this disorder usually exhibit:

- Superciliary arc prominence
- Unibrow (clinically known as synophrys)
- Strabismus
- Large ears with anteversion
- Large nose
- Teeth malocclusion
- Psychomotor delay
- Intellectual disabilities
- Pulmonic stenosis
- Patent ductus arteriosus
- Atrial septal defect

Less common symptoms include chest defects, kyphoscoliosis, diastasis recti ane cryptorchidism

== Cases ==
6 cases have been reported in medical literature:

- Gerhard Neuhäuser and John M. Opitz describes 3 out of 5 siblings from a 2-generation non-consanguineous family from Wisconsin with the symptoms mentioned above. These kids had IQs ranging from 47 to 67, which is considered clinical mental retardation. The youngest affected sibling had two X chromosomes and one Y chromosome and his father had te mosaic version of said disorder (46,XY/47,XXY). 1975
- Garcia-Sagredo et al. describes 2 out of 3 siblings from a Spanish family. They had both the symptoms and the additional findings listed above in the article. One (male) of the children and his unaffected mother carried a balanced translocation on the 20th chromosome and the X chromosome. 1984
- Parul Jain, Ritu Arora, Abhilasha Sanoria, Akshay K Singh described 1 out of 3 siblings from a 2-generation family from New Delhi, India: an 11 year old boy with the symptoms mentioned above and blepharoptosis with low visual acuity. 2022
