= Robinow syndrome =

Rare genetic disorder

- An infant exhibiting the facial features of Robinow syndrome.
- Specialty: Medical genetics

Robinow syndrome is an extremely rare genetic disorder characterized by short-limbed dwarfism, abnormalities in the head, face, and external genitalia, and vertebral segmentation. The disorder was first described in 1969 by human geneticist Meinhard Robinow, along with physicians Frederic N. Silverman and Hugo D. Smith, in the American Journal of Diseases of Children. By 2002, over 100 cases had been documented and introduced into medical literature.

Two forms of the disorder exist, dominant and recessive, of which the former is more common. Patients with the dominant version are often moderately affected by the aforementioned symptoms. Recessive cases, on the other hand, are usually more physically marked, and individuals may exhibit more skeletal abnormalities. The recessive form is particularly frequent in Turkey. However, this can likely be explained by a common ancestor, as these patients' families can be traced to a single town in Eastern Turkey. Clusters of the autosomal recessive form have also been documented in Oman and Czechoslovakia.

The syndrome is also known as Robinow-Silverman-Smith syndrome, Robinow dwarfism, fetal face, fetal face syndrome, fetal facies syndrome, acral dysostosis with facial and genital abnormalities, or mesomelic dwarfism-small genitalia syndrome. The recessive form was previously known as Covesdem syndrome.

== Signs and symptoms ==
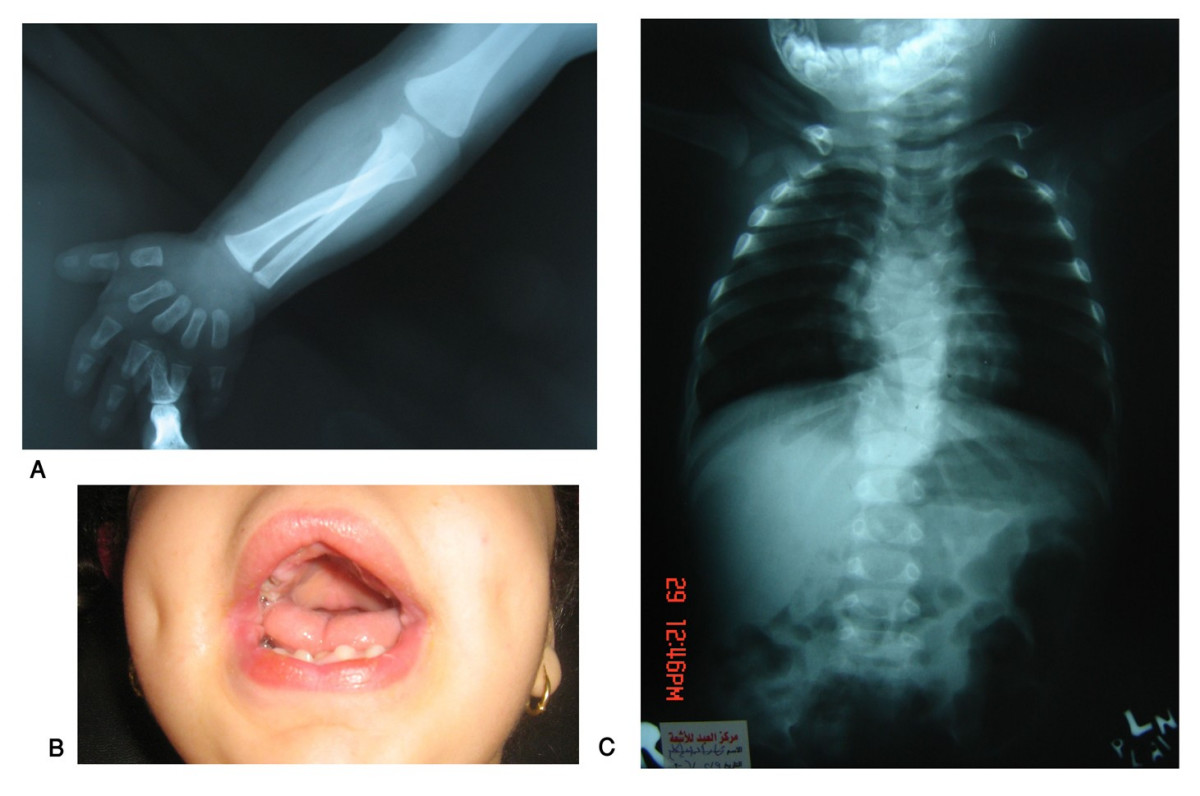
X-ray upper limbs and hands showing mesomelic shortening and brachydactyly (A), and X-ray vertebrae showing hemivertebrae and vertebral fusion.

Robinow noted the resemblance of affected patients' faces to that of a fetus, using the term "fetal facies" to describe the appearance of a small face and widely spaced eyes. Clinical features also may include a short, upturned nose, a prominent forehead, and a flat nasal bridge. The upper lip may be "tented", exposing dental crowding, "tongue tie", or gum hypertrophy.

Though the eyes do not protrude, abnormalities in the lower eyelid may give that impression. Surgery may be necessary if the eyes cannot close fully. In addition, the ears may be set low on the head or have a deformed pinna.

Patients present with dwarfism, short lower arms, small feet, and small hands. Fingers and toes may also be abnormally short and laterally or medially bent. The thumb may be displaced and some patients, notably in Turkey, experience ectrodactyly. All patients often have vertebral segmentation abnormalities. Those with the dominant variant have, at most, a single butterfly vertebra. Those with the recessive form, however, may have hemivertebrae, vertebral fusion, and rib anomalies. Some cases resemble Jarcho-Levin syndrome or spondylocostal dysostosis.

Genital defects characteristically seen in males include a micropenis with a normally developed scrotum and testes. Sometimes, testicles may be undescended, or the patient may have hypospadias. Female genital defects may include a reduced size clitoris and underdeveloped labia minora. Infrequently, the labia majora may also be underdeveloped. Some research has shown that females may experience vaginal atresia or haematocolpos.

The autosomal recessive form of the disorder tends to be much more severe. Examples of differences are summarized in the following table:

Characteristic	Autosomal recessive	Autosomal dominant
Stature	Shorter stature – 2 SD or less	Short or normal
Arms	Very short	Slightly short
Elbow	Radial head dislocation	No radial head dislocation
Upper lip	Tented upper lip	Normal upper lip
Mortality rate	10% mortality	No excess mortality

=== Associated conditions ===
Medical conditions include frequent ear infection, hearing loss, hypotonia, developmental problems, respiratory problems, eating difficulties, light sensitivity, and esophageal reflux.

Data on fertility and the development of secondary sex characteristics is relatively sparse. It has been reported that both male and female patients have had children. Males who have reproduced have all had the autosomal dominant form of the disorder; the fertility of those with the recessive variant is unknown.

Researchers have also reported abnormalities in the renal tract of affected patients. Hydronephrosis is a relatively common condition, and researchers have theorized that this may lead to urinary tract infections. In addition, a number of patients have been affected by cystic dysplasia of the kidney.

A number of other conditions are often associated with Robinow syndrome. About 15% of reported patients have congenital heart defects. Though there is no clear pattern, the most common conditions include pulmonary stenosis and atresia. In addition, though intelligence is generally normal, around 15% of patients show developmental delays.

== Genetics ==
Genetic studies have linked the autosomal recessive form of the disorder to the ROR2 gene on position 9 of the long arm of chromosome 9. The gene is responsible for aspects of bone and cartilage growth. This same gene is involved in causing autosomal dominant brachydactyly B.

The autosomal dominant form has been linked to three genes – WNT5A, Segment polarity protein dishevelled homolog DVL-1 (DVL1) and Segment polarity protein dishevelled homolog DVL-3 (DVL3). This form is often caused by new mutations and is generally less severe than the recessive form. Two further genes have been linked to this disorder – Frizzled-2 (FZD2) and Nucleoredoxin. All of these genes belong to the WNT signalling pathway.

A fetal ultrasound can offer prenatal diagnosis 19 weeks into pregnancy. However, the characteristics of a fetus affected by the milder dominant form may not always be easy to differentiate from a more serious recessive case. Genetic counseling is an option given the availability of a family history.

== Diagnosis ==
Robinow syndrome is suspected by clinical findings and family history and confirmed by detecting pathogenic variants in the aforementioned genes by molecular genetics methods such as whole exome sequencing

== Treatment ==
Treatment of the various manifestations will usually be addressed by a multidisciplinary team.

== History ==
The disorder was first described in 1969 by the German–American human geneticist Meinhard Robinow (1909–1997), along with physicians Frederic N. Silverman and Hugo D. Smith, in the American Journal of Diseases of Children. By 2002, over 100 cases had been documented and introduced into medical literature.
