= Léry =

Léry may refer to:

== People ==
- Jean de Léry (1536–1613), French explorer and writer
- François-Joseph Chaussegros de Léry (1754-1824), Canadian-born military engineer
- Gaspard-Joseph Chaussegros de Léry (1721–1797), Quebec-born military engineer and politician
- Gaspard-Joseph Chaussegros de Léry (1682–1756), French-born Chief Engineer of New France
- Louis-René Chaussegros de Léry (1762–1832), soldier and politician in Lower Canada

== Places ==
- Léry, Côte-d'Or, a commune in the Côte-d'Or department in France
- Léry, Eure, a commune in the Eure department in France
- Léry, Quebec, Canada, a small town
- Saint-Léry, a commune in the Morbihan department in France

== See also ==
- Leri (disambiguation)
- Lhéry, commune in the Marne department in France
