= SNRNP40 =

Protein-coding gene in humans

Identifiers
- Aliases: SNRNP40, 40K, HPRP8BP, PRP8BP, PRPF8BP, SPF38, WDR57, small nuclear ribonucleoprotein U5 subunit 40
- External IDs: OMIM: 607797; MGI: 1913835; GeneCards: SNRNP40
Available structures
PDB	Ortholog search: PDBe RCSB
PDB	List of PDB id codes 3JCR

Gene location (Human)
Chr.	Chromosome 1 (human)
Band	1p35.2	Start	31,259,568 bp
Band	1p35.2	End	31,296,788 bp

Gene location (Mouse)
Chr.	Chromosome 4 (mouse)
Band	4|4 D2.2	Start	130,253,925 bp
Band	4|4 D2.2	End	130,283,819 bp
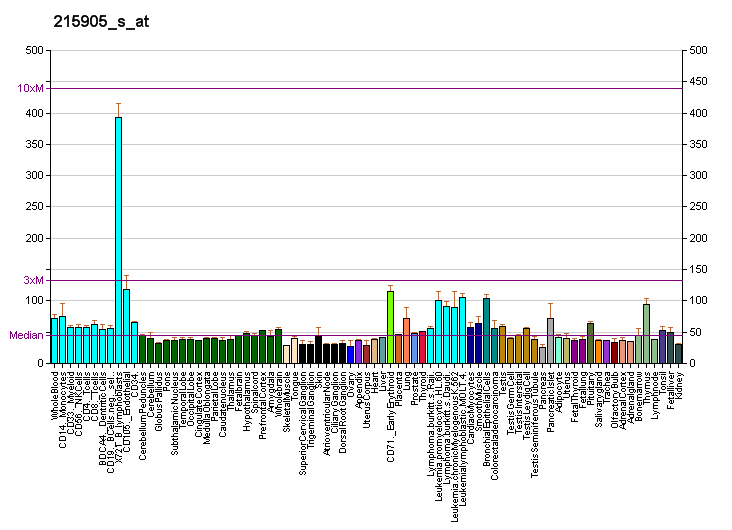
RNA expression pattern
Bgee	Human / Mouse (ortholog); Top expressed in: ganglionic eminence; ventricular zone; mucosa of transverse colon; cerebellar hemisphere; C1 segment; anterior pituitary; right hemisphere of cerebellum; ectocervix; right ovary; tibial nerve / Top expressed in: epiblast; ventricular zone; genital tubercle; tail of embryo; ganglionic eminence; embryo; embryo; neural tube; mesencephalon; bone marrow; More reference expression data
BioGPS	More reference expression data
Gene ontology
Molecular function	protein binding; RNA binding
Cellular component	sno(s)RNA-containing ribonucleoprotein complex; U5 snRNP; catalytic step 2 spliceosome; spliceosomal complex; precatalytic spliceosome; nucleus; nucleoplasm; cytosol; nuclear speck; U2-type catalytic step 2 spliceosome
Biological process	RNA splicing, via transesterification reactions; mRNA splicing, via spliceosome; mRNA processing; RNA processing; RNA splicing
Sources:Amigo / QuickGO
Orthologs
Databases	NCBI: entry; OMA: entry
Species	Human	Mouse
Entrez	9410	66585
Ensembl	ENSG00000060688	ENSMUSG00000074088
UniProt	Q96DI7	Q6PE01
RefSeq (mRNA)	NM_004814	NM_025645
RefSeq (protein)	NP_004805	NP_079921
Location (UCSC)	Chr 1: 31.26 – 31.3 Mb	Chr 4: 130.25 – 130.28 Mb
PubMed search
- Wikidata
View/Edit Human	View/Edit Mouse

U5 small nuclear ribonucleoprotein 40 kDa protein (or U5-40K) is a protein that in humans is encoded by the gene SNRNP40 (previously WDR57). This gene is found in many organisms, including, but not limited to Homo sapiens, Gallus gallus, Pan troglodytes, Canus familiaris, Bos taurus, Mus musculus, and Rattus norvegicus.

== Function ==
U5-40K is a component of the U5 small nuclear ribonucleoprotein (snRNP) particle. The U5 snRNP is part of the spliceosome, a multiprotein complex that catalyzes the removal of introns from pre-messenger RNAs.

== Interactions ==
U5-40K has been shown to interact with PRPF8 and EFTUD2.
