= Reardon-Hall-Slaney syndrome =

- Other names: mesomelic dysplasia with cleft palate and camptodactyly syndrome, mesomelic limb shortening and bowing, mesomelic dwarfism cleft palate camptodactyly
- Specialty: Medical genetics
- Symptoms: dwarfism due to limb shortening, camptodactyly and a cleft palate
- Usual onset: Birth
- Duration: Life-long
- Causes: Autosomal recessive genetic mutation
- Differential diagnosis: Idiopathic cleft palate, idiopathic short stature, dismelia
- Prevention: none
- Prognosis: good
- Frequency: very rare, only 2 cases have been recorded in medical literature

Reardon-Hall-Slaney syndrome, also known as mesomelic dwarfism-cleft palate-camptodactyly, is a rare genetic disorder which is characterized by mesomelic limb shortening and bowing, finger camptodactyly, skin dimpling, retrognathia and mandibular hypoplasia. Only 2 cases of this syndrome have been described in medical literature, both of those cases being a brother and sister who were born to consanguineous parents. This disorder is inherited in an autosomal recessive fashion.
