= EFTUD2 =

Protein-coding gene in humans

Identifiers
- Aliases: EFTUD2, MFDGA, MFDM, SNRNP116, Snrp116, Snu114, U5-116KD, elongation factor Tu GTP binding domain containing 2
- External IDs: OMIM: 603892; MGI: 1336880; GeneCards: EFTUD2
Available structures
PDB	Ortholog search: PDBe RCSB
PDB	List of PDB id codes 3JCR

Gene location (Human)
Chr.	Chromosome 17 (human)
Band	17q21.31	Start	44,849,948 bp
Band	17q21.31	End	44,899,445 bp

Gene location (Mouse)
Chr.	Chromosome 11 (mouse)
Band	11|11 E1	Start	102,729,299 bp
Band	11|11 E1	End	102,771,811 bp
RNA expression pattern
Bgee	Human / Mouse (ortholog); Top expressed in: bone marrow cell; tibialis anterior muscle; ventricular zone; monocyte; mucosa of ileum; ganglionic eminence; skin of arm; gastrocnemius muscle; stromal cell of endometrium; islet of Langerhans / Top expressed in: maxillary prominence; mandibular prominence; tail of embryo; abdominal wall; somite; dermis; epiblast; internal carotid artery; external carotid artery; primitive streak; More reference expression data
BioGPS	n/a
Gene ontology
Molecular function	nucleotide binding; GTP binding; protein binding; GTPase activity; RNA binding; U5 snRNA binding
Cellular component	Cajal body; nuclear speck; catalytic step 2 spliceosome; spliceosomal complex; membrane; nucleus; nucleoplasm; extracellular matrix; cytosol; U4/U6 x U5 tri-snRNP complex; U2-type catalytic step 2 spliceosome; ribonucleoprotein complex; U2-type precatalytic spliceosome
Biological process	mRNA splicing, via spliceosome; mRNA processing; RNA splicing; response to cocaine
Sources:Amigo / QuickGO
Orthologs
Databases	NCBI: entry; OMA: entry
Species	Human	Mouse
Entrez	9343	20624
Ensembl	ENSG00000108883	ENSMUSG00000020929
UniProt	Q15029	O08810
RefSeq (mRNA)	NM_001142605; NM_001258353; NM_001258354; NM_004247	NM_001109995; NM_011431
RefSeq (protein)	NP_001136077; NP_001245282; NP_001245283; NP_004238	NP_001103465; NP_035561
Location (UCSC)	Chr 17: 44.85 – 44.9 Mb	Chr 11: 102.73 – 102.77 Mb
PubMed search
- Wikidata
View/Edit Human	View/Edit Mouse

116 kDa U5 small nuclear ribonucleoprotein component is a protein that in humans is encoded by the EFTUD2 gene.

== Disease associations ==
Heterozygous loss-of-function mutations in EFTUD2 cause Mandibulofacial Dysostosis with Microcephaly (MFDM; OMIM #610536), a multiple malformation syndrome comprising progressive microcephaly (present in all affected individuals), craniofacial skeletal anomalies, cleft palate, deafness, choanal atresia, small stature, and/or cardiac and thumb anomalies.

== Interactions ==
EFTUD2 has been shown to interact with WDR57 and PRPF8.
