= PRPF8 =

Protein-coding gene in the species Homo sapiens

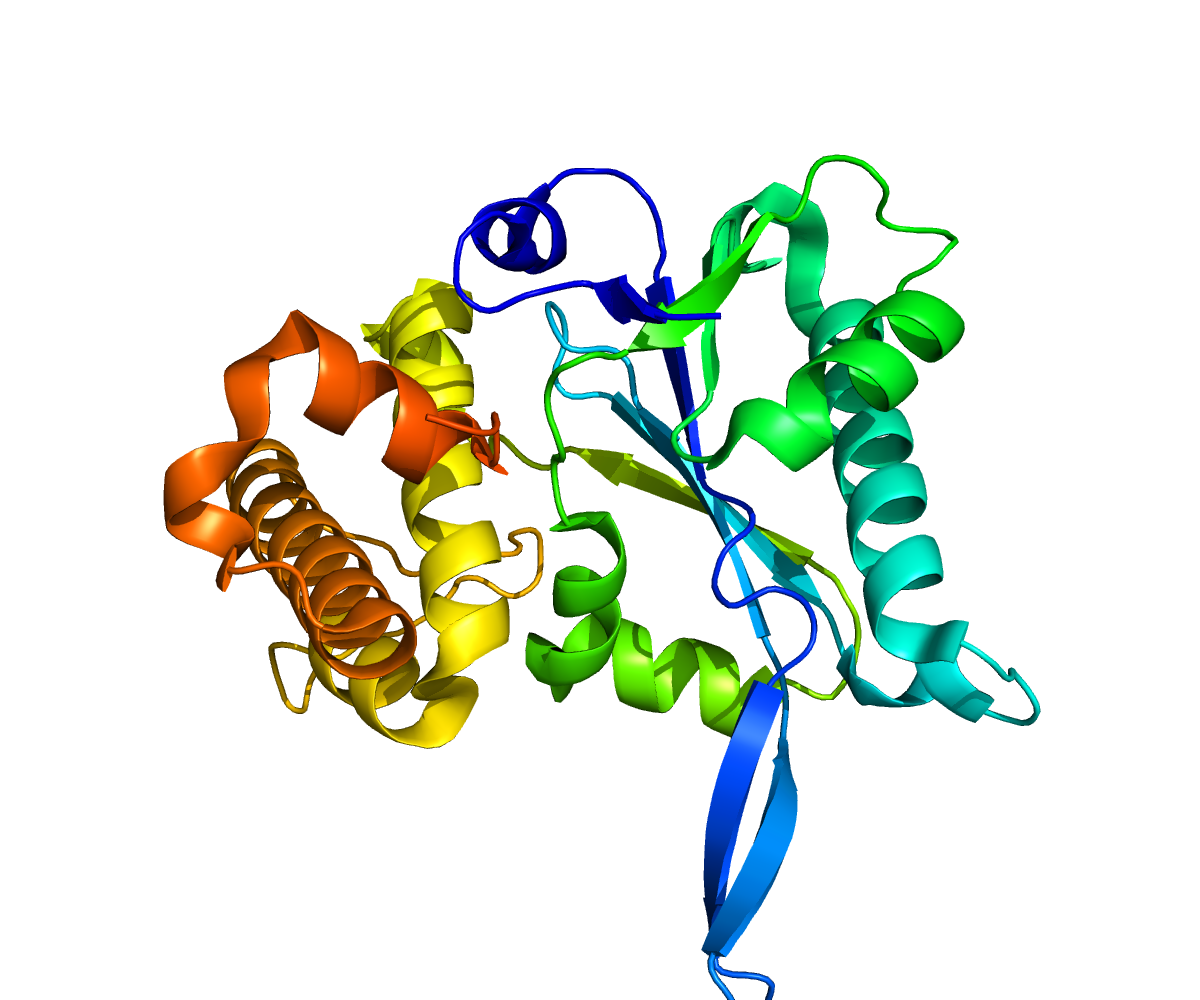

Identifiers
- Aliases: PRPF8, pre-mRNA processing factor 8, HPRP8, PRP8, PRPC8, RP13, SNRNP220
- External IDs: OMIM: 607300; MGI: 2179381; GeneCards: PRPF8
Available structures
PDB	Ortholog search: PDBe RCSB
PDB	List of PDB id codes 3E9L, 3ENB, 3LRU, 4JK7, 4JK8, 4JK9, 4JKA, 4JKB, 4JKC, 4JKD, 4JKE, 4JKF, 4JKG, 4JKH, 4KIT, 3JCR

Gene location (Human)
Chr.	Chromosome 17 (human)
Band	17p13.3	Start	1,650,629 bp
Band	17p13.3	End	1,684,867 bp

Gene location (Mouse)
Chr.	Chromosome 11 (mouse)
Band	11 B5|11 45.92 cM	Start	75,377,642 bp
Band	11 B5|11 45.92 cM	End	75,400,275 bp
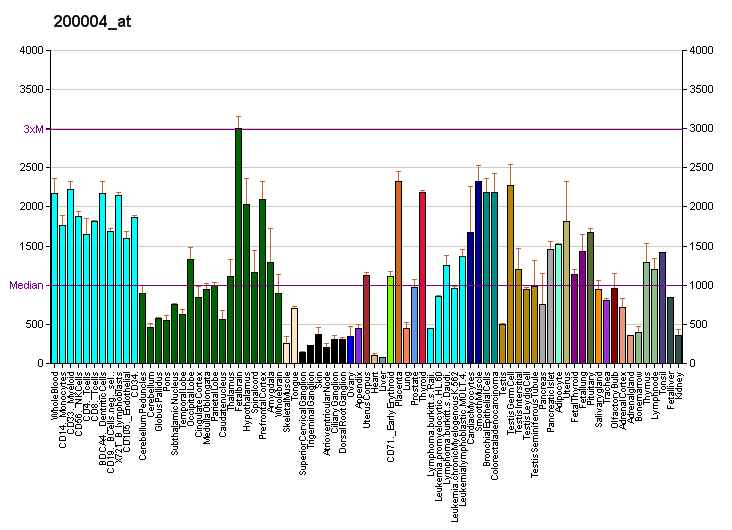

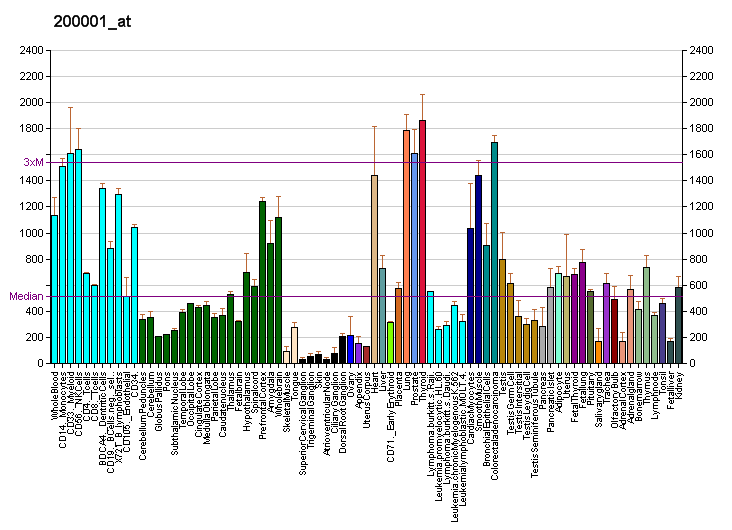

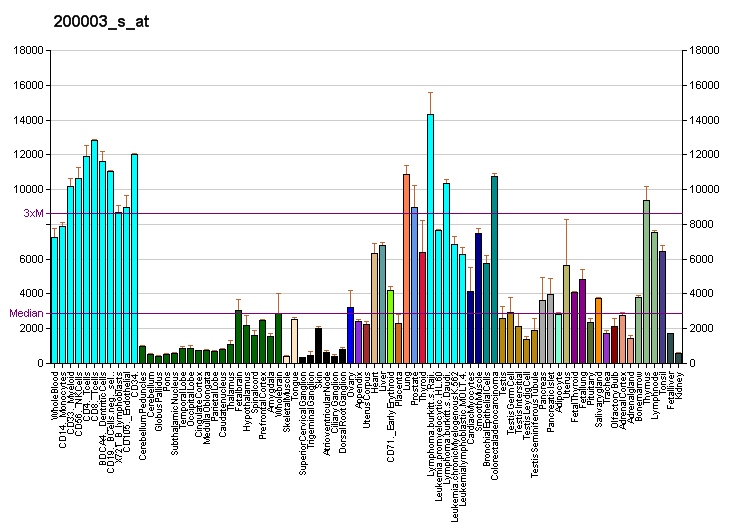
RNA expression pattern
Bgee	Human / Mouse (ortholog); Top expressed in: anterior pituitary; ventricular zone; bone marrow cell; ganglionic eminence; left ovary; right ovary; right hemisphere of cerebellum; epithelium of colon; right lobe of thyroid gland; left testis / Top expressed in: tail of embryo; genital tubercle; mandibular prominence; neural layer of retina; epiblast; maxillary prominence; corneal stroma; efferent ductule; medial ganglionic eminence; primitive streak; More reference expression data
BioGPS	More reference expression data
Gene ontology
Molecular function	K63-linked polyubiquitin modification-dependent protein binding; protein binding; RNA binding; second spliceosomal transesterification activity; U6 snRNA binding; U1 snRNA binding; U2 snRNA binding; U5 snRNA binding; pre-mRNA intronic binding
Cellular component	nuclear speck; catalytic step 2 spliceosome; membrane; U5 snRNP; nucleoplasm; small nuclear ribonucleoprotein complex; spliceosomal complex; nucleus; U4/U6 x U5 tri-snRNP complex; U2-type precatalytic spliceosome; U2-type catalytic step 2 spliceosome
Biological process	mRNA splicing, via spliceosome; spliceosomal tri-snRNP complex assembly; RNA splicing, via transesterification reactions; cellular response to tumor necrosis factor; mRNA processing; RNA splicing; cellular response to lipopolysaccharide
Sources:Amigo / QuickGO
Orthologs
Databases	NCBI: entry; OMA: entry
Species	Human	Mouse
Entrez	10594	192159
Ensembl	ENSG00000274442; ENSG00000174231	ENSMUSG00000020850
UniProt	Q6P2Q9	Q99PV0
RefSeq (mRNA)	NM_006445	NM_138659
RefSeq (protein)	NP_006436	NP_619600
Location (UCSC)	Chr 17: 1.65 – 1.68 Mb	Chr 11: 75.38 – 75.4 Mb
PubMed search
- Wikidata
View/Edit Human	View/Edit Mouse

Pre-mRNA-processing-splicing factor 8 is a protein that in humans is encoded by the PRPF8 gene.

== Function ==
Pre-mRNA splicing occurs in 2 sequential transesterification steps. The protein encoded by this gene is a component of both U2- and U12-dependent spliceosomes, and found to be essential for the catalytic step II in pre-mRNA splicing process. It contains several WD repeats, which function in protein-protein interactions. This protein has a sequence similarity to yeast Prp8 protein. This gene is a candidate gene for autosomal dominant retinitis pigmentosa.

== Interactions ==
PRPF8 has been shown to interact with WDR57 and EFTUD2.
