= Congenital disorders of amino acid metabolism =

- The general structure of an α-amino acid, with the amino group on the left and the carboxyl group on the right
- Specialty: Endocrinology

Congenital errors of amino acid metabolism are inherited metabolic disorders that impair the synthesis and degradation of amino acids. This means that the body has trouble breaking down and building some amino acids, the building blocks of protein in the body. The body can also have trouble with cellular update up amino acids. There are many different disorders in this classification and it can manifest in different ways. Many of these disorders result in the buildup of amino acids in the body which can be harmful and sometimes life threatening. Many of these disorders are part of newborn screening blood tests to ensure an early diagnosis and appropriate treatment for best possible outcomes.

== Types ==
- Alkaptonuria
- Aspartylglucosaminuria
- Branched-chain keto acid dehydrogenase kinase deficiency
- Methylmalonic acidemia
- Maple syrup urine disease
- Homocystinuria
- Tyrosinemia
- Trimethylaminuria
- Hartnup disease
- Biotinidase deficiency
- Ornithine carbamoyltransferase deficiency
- Carbamoyl-phosphate synthase I deficiency disease
- Citrullinemia
- Hyperargininemia
- Hyperhomocysteinemia
- Hypermethioninemia
- Hyperlysinemias
- Nonketotic hyperglycinemia
- Propionic acidemia
- Hyperprolinemia

== Amino acid transport disorders ==
- Cystinuria
- Dicarboxylic aminoaciduria
- Hartnup disease

== Amino acid storage disorders ==
- Glutaric acidemia type 2
