= Porencephaly-cerebellar hypoplasia-internal malformations syndrome =

- Other names: Bonnemann Meinecke syndrome
- Specialty: Medical genetics
- Frequency: 0.0001%

Porencephaly-cerebellar hypoplasia-internal malformations syndrome is a rare autosomal recessive syndrome that mainly affects the central nervous system. It causes cardiac defects, brain anomalies, and craniofacial dysmorphisms. It has been reported in a pair of German siblings of the opposite sex born to consanguineous Turkish parents.

== Discovery ==
This condition was first discovered in 1996 by Bonnemann and Meinecke, their patients were a pair of infant siblings of the opposite sex (brother and sister) who had multiple congenital anomalies, all of which were internal.

The siblings' parents were first-degree cousins of Turkish ancestry.

The both of them exhibited bilateral porencephaly, an underdeveloped cerebellum, an absent vermis, an absent septum pellucidum, and generalized internal malformations, most of which were unique to one another;

The brother was noted to have situs inversus totalis (a condition in which most to all organs of the body are facing the opposite way they would normally be facing) and tetralogy of Fallot (type of congenital cardiac defect).

The sister was noted to have an atrial septal defect (type of congenital cardiac defect).

They had cranio-facial dysmorphisms such as hypertelorism, epicanthic folds, prominence of the metopic suture, a high arched palate, and macrocephaly. Other features that were found in the siblings included epilepsy and corneal clouding.

== See also ==
- Holoprosencephaly-ectrodactyly-cleft lip/palate syndrome
