= Kozlowski-Krajewska syndrome =

- Other names: Intellectual disability–polydactyly–uncombable hair syndrome; Mental retardation; Postaxial polydactyly; Phalangeal hypoplasia; 2–3 toe syndactyly; Unusual face; Uncombable hair
- Specialty: Medical genetics
- Frequency: 0.0001%

Kozlowski-Krajewska syndrome, also known as intellectual disability–polydactyly–uncombable hair syndrome, is a multi-systemic genetic disorder which is characterized by intellectual disability, abnormalities in the fingers and toes, uncombable hair and facial dysmorphia.

== Presentation ==
People with Kozlowski-Krajewska syndrome typically show the following symptoms:

- Intellectual disability
- Phalangeal hypoplasia
- Post-axial polydactyly
- Toe syndactyly (affecting the 2nd and 3rd toes), also known as webbed toes
- Uncombable hair syndrome
- Frontal bossing
- Hypotelorism
- Narrow palpebral fissures
- Prominence of nasal root
- Large ears
- Poorly folded helix
- Hypoplasia of the lobule and antitragus
- Progressive micrognathia

Cryptorchidism, hearing loss, and progressive thoracic kyphosis have also been reported.
