= Microcornea, glaucoma, and absent frontal sinuses =

- Specialty: Medical genetics, Ophthalmology
- Causes: Genetic mutation
- Prevention: none
- Prognosis: Good
- Frequency: very rare, only 4 cases have been described in medical literature
- Deaths: -

Microcornea, glaucoma, and absent frontal sinuses is a very rare developmental genetic disorder that occurs during embryogenesis which is characterized by a combination of microcornea, glaucoma and missing/underdeveloped sinuses. Additional findings include increased palmar skin thickness and torus palatinus. It has been described in four members of a 3-generation family from Boston, Massachusetts (1969).
