= Verloes Van Maldergem Marneffe syndrome =

- Specialty: Medical genetics
- Symptoms: ocular, skeletal, and developmental abnormalities
- Complications: impaired vision, low self esteem
- Usual onset: birth
- Duration: life-long
- Causes: Autosomal dominant genetic mutation
- Prevention: none
- Frequency: very rare; at least 6 cases have been reported in medical literature

Verloes Van Maldergem Marneffe syndrome, also known as microspherophakia-metaphyseal dysplasia, is a very rare genetic disorder which is characterized by flattened and deformed vertebrae, developmental delay, dysplasia of the epiphyses and metaphyses, lens coloboma and dislocation, microspherophakia, nearsightedness, retinal detachment, and spinal stenosis. It has been described in a father and his son, and is thought to be inherited in an autosomal dominant manner. It's thought to be caused by mutations in the IRF6 gene.
