= Mietens syndrome =

- Other names: Intellectual disability, Mietens-Weber type; Mietens-Weber syndrome; Corneal opacity, nystagmus, flexion contracture of the elbows, growth failure, and mental retardation; Mental retardation syndrome, Mietens Weber type
- This condition is inherited via an autosomal recessive pattern

Mietens syndrome is an autosomal recessive disorder first described by Mietens and Weber. The condition is named after a German physician named Carl Mietens.

Only 9 cases have been reported.

== Symptoms and signs ==
1. Intellectual disability
2. Flat feet
3. Crossed eyes
4. Severe postnatal growth retardation
5. Nystagmus
6. Narrow nose
7. Short forearm bones
8. Absent proximal radial epiphyses
9. Autosomal recessive inheritance
10. Dislocated radial head
11. Sclerocornea has been reported in this condition.

== History ==
In 1966, Carl Mietens and Helge Weber reported cases of four children, 3 sisters and 1 brother who suffered from a cluster of congenital anomalies and intellectual disabilities.

In 2006, two documented has been reported.
