= Urban–Rogers–Meyer syndrome =

- Other names: Prader–Willi habitus, osteopenia, and camptodactyly
- This condition is inherited in an autosomal recessive manner
- Specialty: Medical genetics

Urban–Rogers–Meyer syndrome, also known as Prader–Willi habitus, osteopenia, and camptodactyly or Urban syndrome, is an extremely rare inherited congenital disorder first described by Urban et al. (1979). It is characterized by genital anomalies, intellectual disability, obesity, contractures of fingers, and osteoporosis, though further complications are known.
