= Michels Caskey syndrome =

Stratton-Parker Syndrome
- Other names: Mullerian aplasia with hypoplastic thumbs
- Specialty: Orthopedic

Michels Caskey syndrome is a rare disorder that combines spinal and skeletal abnormalities, especially of the thumbs, with abnormal or absent female reproductive organs. Examples include the absence of a cervix and upper vagina or abnormalities of the uterus or vagina. Symptoms may also include scoliosis and primary amenorrhea. Synonyms include hypoplastic thumb Mullerian aplasia, and Mullerian aplasia with unilateral hypoplasia of the thumbs and skeletal spine deformities.

== See also ==
- Müllerian aplasia
