= Ataxia-pancytopenia syndrome =

- Specialty: Neurology
- Causes: genetic

Ataxia-pancytopenia syndrome is a rare autosomal dominant disorder characterized by cerebellar ataxia, peripheral neuropathies, pancytopenia and a predilection to myelodysplastic syndrome and acute myeloid leukemia.

== Genetics ==
This syndrome is caused by mutations in the sterile alpha motif domain containing 9-like (SAMD9L) gene. This gene is located on the long arm of chromosome 7.

== History ==
Ataxia-pancytopenia syndrome, also known as myelocerebellar dysfunction, was first described by Frederick Pei Li in 1978. The father and all five of his children developed ataxia and hematologic cytopenias of varying severity during their first to third decades of life.
