= Michelin tire baby syndrome =

- Specialty: Dermatology

Michelin tire baby syndrome (also known as Kunze–Riehm syndrome and "folded skin with scarring"), is a condition occurring in babies that is characterized by multiple, symmetric, circular skin creases, or bands, on the forearms, lower legs, and often the neck that are present at birth. The creases disappear later in life. They are reminiscent of those of Bibendum, the mascot of the tire manufacturer Michelin, hence the name of the syndrome. Associated abnormalities vary and may include facial dysmorphism, upslanting palpebral fissures, hypertelorism, cleft palate, genital anomalies, mild developmental delay, ureterocele, smooth muscle hamartoma, nevus lipomatosus, Laron syndrome (dwarfism with high growth hormone and low somatomedin activity), and other defects.

It was originally described by Ross in 1969.

== See also ==
- List of cutaneous conditions
