= Muscular atrophy-ataxia-retinitis pigmentosa-diabetes mellitus syndrome =

- Other names: Kurukawa-Takagi-Nakao syndrome
- Specialty: Medical genetics
- Usual onset: Adolescence
- Duration: Lifelong
- Causes: Genetic mutation
- Prevention: none
- Prognosis: Medium, nearing bad
- Frequency: Very rare, only 10 cases have been described in medical literature.
- Deaths: -

Muscular atrophy-ataxia-retinitis pigmentosa-diabetes mellitus syndrome, also known as Kurukawa-Takagi-Nakao syndrome, is a very rare genetic disorder which is characterized by muscular atrophy, cerebellar ataxia, reduced sense of touch, retinal degeneration, and diabetes mellitus beginning in late childhood-early adolescence. It is inherited in an autosomal dominant manner. It has been described in 10 members from a large 4-generation Japanese family (1986).
