= Mandibulofacial dysostosis-microcephaly syndrome =

- Other names: Mandibulofacial dysostosis, Guion-Almeida type, MFDM (abbr.)
- Specialty: Medical genetics
- Causes: Genetic mutation
- Differential diagnosis: Isolated Microcephaly, Goldenhar syndrome, Treacher Collins syndrome, Nager acrofacial dysostosis
- Prevention: none
- Prognosis: Medium with treatment, poor without it
- Frequency: rare, about 100 cases have been reported
- Deaths: -

Mandibulofacial dysostosis with microcephaly syndrome, also known as growth delay-intellectual disability-mandibulofacial dysostosis-microcephaly-cleft palate syndrome, mandibulofacial dysostosis, guion-almeida type, or simply as MFDM syndrome is a rare genetic disorder which is characterized by developmental delays, intellectual disabilities, and craniofacial dysmorphisms.

== Signs and symptoms ==
People with this condition are usually born with congenital microcephaly, the type of microcephaly individuals with this condition exhibit progressive microcephaly, this condition gives the appearance that the head is getting smaller as one ages, this is not true whatsoever; what is actually happening is that the head does not grow at the same rate as the rest of the body.

Other craniofacial dysmorphisms include malar hypoplasia, midface and cheekbone hypoplasia, micrognathia, and small abnormally-shaped ears.

In some individuals with MFDM syndrome, preauricular tags are present. Patients (especially the ones with the difference that was mentioned beforehand) have a higher risk of having anomalies in the ear canal, the auditory ossicles, or semicircular canals. These abnormalities (with the exception of the preauricular tags) end up in hearing loss in some to most cases.

There are also oral and respiratory anomalies present within the condition, cleft palates and choanal atresia aren't uncommon findings. Choanal atresia in particular can end up causing breathing difficulties to the patient.

Occasional findings include short stature, heart and thumb defects, esophageal atresia, and tracheoesophageal fistula. These last two symptoms are highly fatal, and may end up in premature death if left untreated.

=== Complications ===
Unilateral choanal atresia can cause neo-natal breathing difficulties and posteriorly mouth breathing, which, although not especially life-threatening, can be deprimental and cause symptoms such as narrow face, tired eyes, etc.

Bilateral choanal atresia can cause respiratory distress and, in most cases, arrest.

Esophageal atresia and tracheoesophageal fistula can be deadly if they are left untreated. The latter causes an abnormal connection between the esophagus and the trachea, which causes esophageal fluids to enter the airways and cause respiratory problems. The combination of both esophageal atresia and tracheoesophageal fistula is especially life-threatening due to feeding difficulties and recurrent esophageal fluid exposure-associated lung damage.

== Causes ==
This condition is caused by inherited autosomal recessive mutations in the EFTUD2 gene. These mutations can either be missense, splice-site, or the result of a microdeletion. This gene is essential for the formation of spliceosomes, which helps in producing and maturing messenger RNA. The mutations involved in MFDM cause EFTUD2 enzymes with little to no function, which likely impairs the process of maturing mRNA.

== Diagnosis ==
It can be diagnosed by a thorough examination of the patient's symptoms and genetic testing.

== Treatment ==
Treatment is done on the symptoms themselves:

- For craniofacial dysmorphisms: correctional surgeries such as oromaxillofacial surgery, dentistry service, etc.
- For developmental delays: occupational and speech/language therapy.
- For respiratory abnormalities: intubation, tracheostomy.
- For hearing loss: cochlear implant, bone-anchored hearing aids.

== Prevalence ==
Around 100 cases have been described in the medical literature.

== History ==
This disorder was discovered in the year 2000, when Guion-Almeida et al., described 2 Brazilian brothers with growth delays, intellectual disabilities, trigonocephaly, microcephaly, preauricular tags, and cleft palate. They did a follow-up on these patients and 2 new ones: Brazilian siblings of the opposite sex (male and female), they found additional findings they had failed to describe before: zygomatic arc hypoplasia, and micrognathia. They had severe speech/language delay, they found this to be part of a brand new autosomal recessive mandibulofacial dysostosis entity.

== See also ==
- Mandibulofacial dysostosis
