= Mickleson syndrome =

Mickleson syndrome is a very rare congenital condition that is characterized by intellectual disability and/or facial anomalies. It was first described by K.N. Mickleson in 1983.
