= Metaphyseal dysplasia =

- Other names: Pyle's disease, Pyle's syndrome, Pyle-Cohn syndrome, and Bakwin-Krida syndrome
- Specialty: Medical genetics

Metaphyseal dysplasia, or Pyle disease, is a disorder of the bones. It is a rare disease in which the outer part of the shafts of long bones is thinner than normal and there is an increased chance of fractures. Its hallmark feature is an abnormality of the long bones in the arms and legs in which the ends (metaphyses) of the bones are abnormally broad; the shape of the bones resembles a boat oar or paddle. The broad metaphyses are due to enlargement of the spongy inner layer of bone (trabecular bone). Although trabecular bone is expanded, the dense outermost layer of bone (cortical bone) is thinner than normal. As a result, the bones are fragile and fracture easily. The bone abnormalities in the legs commonly cause knock knees (genu valgum) in affected individuals.

Other bone abnormalities can also occur in Pyle disease. Affected individuals may have widened collar bones (clavicles), ribs, or bones in the fingers and hands. Dental problems are common in Pyle disease, including delayed appearance (eruption) of permanent teeth and misalignment of the top and bottom teeth (malocclusion).

== Signs and symptoms ==
It is an autosomal recessive disorder in which mild clinical manifestations contrast with radiological appearances of gross metaphyseal undermodeling. Most patients present with mild genu valgum. The elbows are unable to extend fully. There may be widening of the lower femora and clavicles. Bones can sometimes be fragile, but fracturing is usually not common. Patients may present with dental caries, mandibular prognathism, spinal alignment, and disproportionate limb lengthening. Mental development, physical development, and height are usually normal. Most patients with Pyle's diseases will have symptoms that vary from person to person. Symptoms are:

5%–29% of people have

- Delated eruption of teeth

Other people may have

- Abnormality of thorax
- Absent paranasal sinuses
- Arthralgia
- Carious teeth
- Genu valgum
- Hypoplastic frontal sinuses
- Limited elbow extension
- Mandibular prognathia
- Metaphyseal widening
- Muscle weakness
- Platyspondyly
- Reduced bone mineral density
- Scoliosis
- Thickened calvaria

== Cause ==
This condition is inherited via an autosomal recessive manner

Pyle disease is caused by mutations in the SFRP4 gene. This gene provides instructions for making a protein that blocks (inhibits) a process called Wnt signaling, which is involved in the development of several tissues and organs throughout the body. In particular, regulation of Wnt signaling by the SFRP4 protein is critical for normal bone development and remodeling. Bone remodeling is a normal process in which old bone is broken down and new bone is created to replace it. Mutations in the SFRP4 gene are thought to prevent the production of functional SFRP4 protein. The resulting dysregulation of Wnt signaling leads to the bone abnormalities characteristic of Pyle disease.

Pyle disease is inherited in an autosomal recessive pattern, which means both copies of the SFRP4 gene in each cell have mutations. The parents of an individual with an autosomal recessive condition each carry one copy of the mutated gene. While they do not develop the condition, they may have mild abnormalities of the long bones.

== Diagnosis ==
There are two clinical molecular genetic test that are available to those thought to have Pyle’s Disease. Theses test are; Sequence analysis of the entire coding region and Deletion/duplication analysis.

=== Differential diagnosis ===
Pyle disease may be confused with craniometaphyseal dysplasia. The two, however, are clinically, radiographically, and genetically distinct from one another.

== Treatment ==
People with Pyle disease are often asymptomatic. Dental anomalies may require orthodontic interventions. Skeletal anomalies may require orthopedic surgery.

== Epidemiology ==
Pyle disease is thought to be a rare disorder, although its prevalence is unknown. More than 25 cases have been described in the medical literature.

It has been described in four German families originating from the same town in Bohemia and in a 7-year-old Japanese girl.

== Research ==
Cortical-bone fragility is a common feature in osteoporosis that is linked to nonvertebral fractures. Regulation of cortical-bone homeostasis has proved elusive. The study of genetic disorders of the skeleton can yield insights that fuel experimental therapeutic approaches to the treatment of rare disorders and common skeletal ailments. The study showed that Pyle’s disease was caused by a deficiency of sFRP4, that cortical-bone and trabecular-bone homeostasis were governed by different mechanisms, and that sFRP4-mediated cross-regulation between Wnt and BMP signaling was critical for achieving proper cortical-bone thickness and stability.

Recently, homozygous mutations in secreted frizzled-related protein 4 gene (SFRP4) gene were found to underlie this condition. Sequencing of coding regions of SFRP4 gene from an 11-year-old female with PYL was performed. A novel homozygous nonsense variant, c.183C>G (p.Y61*) was observed. Segregation analysis in the patient revealed a germline mutation, resulting in reduced protein formation.
