= Morse–Rawnsley–Sargent syndrome =

Morse-Rawnsley-Sargent syndrome
- Other names: Holoprosencephaly with fetal akinesia/hypokinesia sequence
- This disorder is inherited in an X-linked recessive manner
- Specialty: Medical genetics, Pediatry
- Symptoms: brain malformations
- Complications: Death
- Usual onset: Pre-natal
- Duration: The rest or the baby's generally short life
- Causes: Problems during embryogenesis
- Prevention: none
- Frequency: Very rare

Morse–Rawnsley–Sargent syndrome is an extraordinarily rare and deadly congenital malformation syndrome which affects the central nervous system during embryogenesis. It occurs before conception.

== Presentation ==
There are various signs and symptoms that manifest in people with this disorder, these include (but are not limited to): holoprosencephaly, fetal hypokinesia, microcephaly, various contractures across the body and growth restriction.

== Etymology ==
This disorder was first discovered by Morse et al. in November 1987 when he reported two fetuses with hypokinesia, and microcephaly caused by holoprosencephaly. Both of the fetuses were male and had extended knees. Their parents were healthy and not related. Morse suspected this to be a case of Neu–Laxova syndrome, however; hyperkeratosis, ichthyosis, facial dysmorphy, distal limb swelling were absent in the fetuses, and the presence of holoprosencephaly clearly made this case unique from the already-mentioned disorder. Morse reported that the disorder was probably either autosomal recessive or X-linked recessive, and that it had enough validity to be considered a separate entity, and exactly one year later (in November 1988), Hockey et al. described a case of two stillborn fetuses which presented the same signs as the fetuses described by Morse, Hockey noticed this and thus realized that with his case report, there was now evidence of a novel X-linked recessive genetic disorder.

A new case was reported in the year 2000, coming from Florianópolis, Brazil. A male fetus was discovered to have signs of the symptoms, he came from two non-related parents, with the father of the baby being a positive HIV-virus-carrier drug addict. Before the baby was born, pre-natal pectus excavatum, holopresencephaly, hypotonia, polyhydramnios, articular contractures, severe microcephaly and a depressed forehead. After being born, additional symptoms were seen, and the baby developed severe jaundice and petechia throughout his body and died hours later.
