= Stocco dos Santos syndrome =

- Other names: SDSS, X-linked intellectual disability Stocco dos Santos type
- Specialty: Medical genetics
- Symptoms: Ocular, muscular and skeletal differences
- Frequency: very rare

Stocco dos Santos syndrome is an extremely rare multi-systemic genetic disorder which is present from birth. It is characterized by heart, skeletal, muscular abnormalities with accompanying intellectual disabilities.

== Presentation ==
People with Stocco dos Santos syndrome often show the following symptoms: dolichocephaly, cranial asymmetry, talipes equinovarus, camptodactyly, Hypoplasia, anophthalmia, Buphthalmos, progressive retinal detachment, aniridia, tricuspid valve prolapse, mitral and tricuspid insufficiency, hyperactivity, intellectual disability, low birth weight and short stature.

== Causes ==
This condition is thought to be caused by mutations in chromosome Xp11.22, and thought to be X-linked recessive.

== Etiology ==
On May 1, 1991, a novel X-linked genetic disorder was discovered through a Brazilian family, when severe intellectual disabilities, bilateral congenital hip dislocation, and low height were found in four male first-cousins, with three out of the four cousins carrying a new variant of glucose-6-phosphate dehydrogenase. There haven't been any more reported cases since 1992.
