= André Léri =

French neurologist (1875–1930)

André Léri (1875 - 8 September 1930) was a French neurologist born in Paris.

He studied medicine in Paris, where he was a student of Joseph Babinski (1857–1932) and Pierre Marie (1853–1940). In 1904 he obtained his doctorate with a dissertation on eye changes associated with tabes dorsalis. During World War I, Léri was in charge of diagnosing soldiers with battle-inflicted neuroses.

He was the author of works in the fields of neurology, ophthalmology and psychiatry, but is largely remembered for contributions made in osteology, particularly in his research of bone disorders. He described a type of mesomelic dwarfism combined with deformed forearms, which was to become known as Léri-Weill dyschondrosteosis. With Pierre Marie, the "Marie-Léri syndrome" is named, which is a hand disorder caused by osteolysis of the articular surfaces of the fingers.

== Bibliography ==
- Spondylose rhizomélique, Handbuch der Neurologie. Volume 2. Berlin, 1911.
- Die Pagetsche Knochenkrankheit. With Pierre Marie. Handbuch der Neurologie. Volume 4. Berlin, 1913.
- Commotions et émotions de guerre. Berlin, 1918. Translated into English.
- Etudes sue les affections des os et des articulations. Berlin, 1926.
- Une varieté de rheumatisme chronique: la main en largnette (présentation de pièceses de coupes). Bulletins et memoires de la Société medicale des hôpitaux de Paris, P. Marie, A.Léri: 1913, 36: 104–107.
