= Microcephaly lymphoedema chorioretinal dysplasia =

- Other names: MLCRD syndrome

Microcephaly lymphoedema chorioretinal dysplasia also known as lymphedema microcephaly chorioretinopathy syndrome is a rare genetic condition associated with:

- Small head (Microcephaly)
- Puffy feet (Lymphoedema)
- Eye problems (Chorio-retinal dysplasia i.e. changes in the retina)

In 1992, Feingold and Bartoshesky described two unrelated children with microcephaly, lymphoedema and chorioretinal dysplasia (MIM 152950) as a distinct entity. Since then there have been further reports of children with these three features (Angle et al. 1994, Fryns et al. 1995, Limwongse et al. 1999, Casteels et al. 2001)

Children have also been seen with two of the above features:

- Microcephaly and lymphoedema
- Microcephaly and chorioretinal dysplasia with or without intellectual disability

== Presentation ==
The distinct facial feature include upslanting palpebral fissures, a broad nose with rounded tip, long philtrum with a thin upper lip, pointed chin and prominent ears (Vasudevan 2005)

== Genetics ==
The former (microcephaly and lymphoedema) has been described as an autosomal dominant (MIM 156590) or X-linked trait, while the latter (microcephaly and chorioretinal dysplasia) has been described as autosomal dominant, autosomal recessive (MIM 251270 or Mirhosseini-Holmes-Walton syndrome) or X-linked trait.
