= MacDermot–Winter syndrome =

- Other names: Prominent glabella microcephaly hypogenitalism
- Specialty: Medical genetics
- Causes: Genetic mutation
- Diagnostic method: Physical evaluation
- Prevention: none
- Frequency: very rare, only 2 cases reported
- Deaths: 2

MacDermot–Winter syndrome is a very rare fatal genetic disorder which is characterized by pre-natal developmental delay, cranio-facial dysmorphisms (such as microcephaly or dolichocephaly), genitalia hypoplasia and congenital-onset seizures. Its prevalence is less than 1 in a million live births.

== Etiology ==
This disorder was discovered by MacDermot et al. in the early winter of 1989, when he described two brothers that came from consanguineous Moslem Pakistani parents. These brothers showed the symptoms mentioned above, but there were also additional symptoms in this case: a prominent glabella, arched eyebrows, a low frontal hairline, small nose, large ears, camptodactyly and nipples with a wide space in between, absence of psychomotor development, and a thriving failure. The same siblings did not live past 1 year of age (one lived to be 21 days old and the other lived to be 7 months old). When one of then were examined (post-mortem), cerebral ventricle dilatation and hydronephrosis were observed. One of the brothers had microcephaly that was detectable by fetal ultrasound when it was 17 weeks into gestation.
