= Langer mesomelic dysplasia =

- Specialty: Medical genetics

Langer Mesomelic Dysplasia (LMD) is a rare congenital disorder characterised by altered bone formation, which typically causes affected individuals to experience shortening of the bones of the extremities as well as an abnormally short stature.

== Signs and symptoms ==
The disease is characterized by severe shortening of long bones, affecting the limb's middle segments more than the proximal and distal segments. There is a severe underdevelopment or complete absence of the ulna and fibula (hypoplasia or aplasia), along with a thickened and curved radius and tibia. Additionally, these anomalies can lead to deformities of the hands and feet, and there may be hypoplasia of the lower jaw as well. Intellectual and motor development of affected persons are normal. Adults reach approximate height of 130 cm.

== Pathogenesis ==
The disease is caused by homozygous or compound heterozygous mutations of the short-stature homeobox gene (SHOX), located at the pseudoautosomal region PAR1 of the human sex chromosomes, or this gene's enhancer region. In other words, it is a genetic abnormality inherited in a recessive manner. Carrying only one mutant allele (heterozygosity) presents as Léri–Weill dyschondrosteosis. Mutations of the enhancer regions may be connected to less severe presentation.

== Diagnosis ==
Diagnosis may be suspected on the basis of the clinical and radiologic findings, which are already present at birth, and can supported by molecular analysis of the SHOX gene. The disease may also be suspected through ultrasound during the second trimester of gestation.

=== Classification ===
LMD is part of the mesomelic and rhizomelic skeletal dysplasias, which are primary bone diseases where the person's short stature is due to a lack of complete bone development of the limb's long bones.

== Treatment ==
Children with Langer mesomelic dysplasia are given Growth hormone; it does not affect the bone anomalies, but it can increase the final height reached by 7 to 10 cm. In selected patients, orthopaedic surgery may be helpful to try to gain some functionality of severely impaired joints.

== Prognosis ==
Life expectancy is normal; walking may be delayed.

== See also ==
- Osteochondrodysplasia
