= Tranebjaerg–Svejgaard syndrome =

- Other names: X-linked mental retardation associated with psoriasis
- Specialty: Medical genetics
- Symptoms: intellect, psychomotor development, and skin anomalies with craniofacial dysmorphisms
- Usual onset: Birth
- Duration: Lifelong
- Causes: X-linked recessive mutation
- Differential diagnosis: X-linked ichthyosis
- Prevention: none
- Prognosis: Poor
- Frequency: Very rare, only 4 cases have been described in medical literature
- Deaths: 2

Tranebjaerg–Svejgaard syndrome, also known as X-linked intellectual disability associated with psoriasis, is a very rare genetic disorder which is characterized by intellectual disabilities, psychomotor development delays, seizures, psoriasis, and cranio-facial dysmorphisms. It is a type of X-linked syndromic intellectual disability. Only 4 cases have been described in medical literature.

== Presentation ==
The following list comprises the symptoms this disorder causes in the people affected by it:

- Severe intellectual disability
- Psychomotor retardation
- Epilepsy
- Psoriasis
- Hypertelorism
- Broad nose
- Anteverted eyes
- Macrostomia
- High palate
- Large ears

== History ==
This condition was first discovered in June 1988, when Tranebjaerg et al. described four male cousins with seizures, severe intellectual disability, and psoriasis. They had normal levels of steroid sulfatase. Only two out of the four male cousins had survived. They (Tranebjaerg et al.) proposed this case to be part of a novel X-linked recessive intellectual disability syndrome. One of the sisters decided to terminate 3 consecutive pregnancies which were pre-natally detected to be male, leaving her with 3 consecutive terminations, after those events, she had a female pregnancy, which presumably wouldn't result in another affected baby.
