= Leri pleonosteosis =

- Specialty: Rheumatology

Leri's pleonosteosis is a rare rheumatic condition. It was first described by the French physician Leri in 1921.

== Presentation ==
The clinical features of this condition include

- Flattened facial features
- Flexion contractures of the interphalangeal joints of hand and foot.
- Limited motion of multiple joints
- Short broad metacarpals, metatarsals and phalanges

Thickening of the skin may occur in a fashion similar to that occurs in scleroderma. The thumbs may be angled in a lateral direction (valgus deformity). The knees may be angled backwards (genu recurvatum). Abnormalities of the upper spinal cord may also occur.

== Genetics ==
It is inherited in an autosomal dominant fashion. The pathogenesis of this condition appears to be due to over expression of two genes: GDF6 and SDC2. These genes are located on the long arm of chromosome 8(8q22.1).

== Diagnosis ==
Diagnosis for Leri pleonostosis can be made by clinical evaluation, taking patient history, characteristic physical findings, and imaging.

== Treatment ==
Treatment of Leri pleonostosis is based on the symptoms of the affected individual, and can include physical therapy and genetic counseling.
