= Microcephaly deafness syndrome =

Rare genetic disorder

- Other names: Microcephaly-deafness syndrome, Microcephaly-deafness-intellectual disability syndrome.
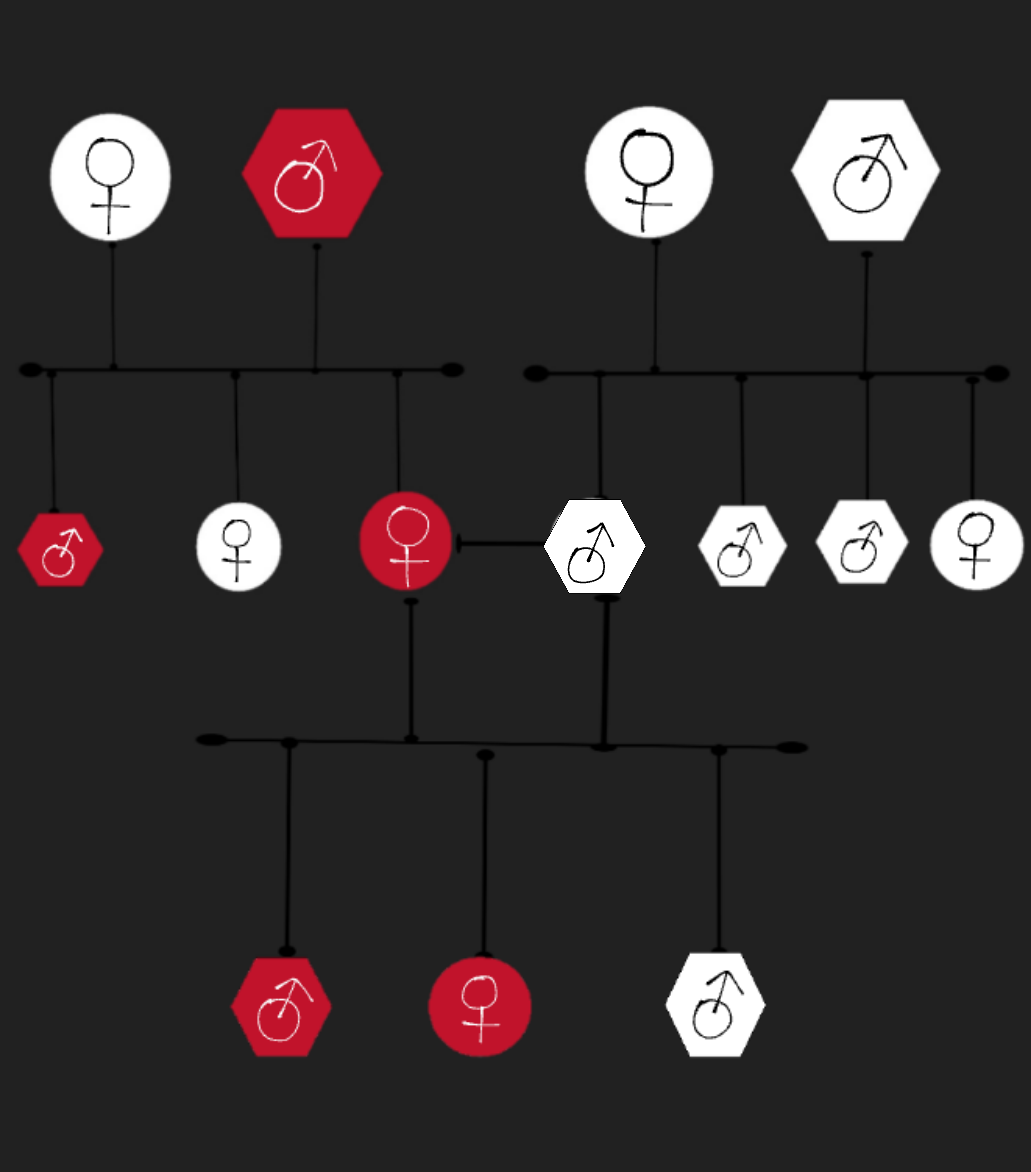
- This disorder is thought to be inherited in an autosomal dominant fashion.
- Specialty: Medical genetics, Pediatry, Psychology
- Symptoms: intellectual disabilities and cranio-facial abnormalities
- Usual onset: Conception
- Duration: Life-long
- Causes: Genetic mutation
- Prognosis: Good
- Frequency: Very rare, only 2 cases have ever been reported.

Microcephaly deafness syndrome is an extremely rare genetic disorder which consists of microcephaly, congenital hearing loss, mild intellectual disability, speech delay, low height, and facial dysmorphisms (such as low-set cup-shaped ears, protruding lower lips, micrognathia, epicanthal folds, drooping lower lip, and a rather big distance between both eyebrows). Only 2 cases of this disorder have been recorded in medical literature; a mother and her son. The researchers who discovered this disorder (H. Kawashima and N. Tsuji in 1987) later suggested that this disorder was inherited in an autosomal dominant manner, although the genetic cause of it has never been found. The disease is estimated to affect less than 1 out of a million people worldwide.
