= Myeloperoxidase deficiency =

- Other names: MPO deficiency
- Hypochlorous acid is normally produced by myeloperoxidase

Myeloperoxidase deficiency is a disorder featuring lack in either the quantity or the function of myeloperoxidase–an iron-containing protein expressed primarily in neutrophil granules. There are two types of myeloperoxidase deficiency: primary/inherited and secondary/acquired. Lack of functional myeloperoxidase leads to less efficient killing of intracellular pathogens, particularly Candida albicans, as well as less efficient production and release of neutrophil extracellular traps (NETs) from the neutrophils to trap and kill extracellular pathogens. Despite these characteristics, more than 95% of individuals with myeloperoxidase deficiency experience no symptoms in their lifetime. For those who do experience symptoms, the most common symptom is frequent infections by Candida albicans. Individuals with myeloperoxidase deficiency also experience higher rates of chronic inflammatory conditions. Myeloperoxidase deficiency is diagnosed using flow cytometry or cytochemical stains. There is no treatment for myeloperoxidase deficiency itself. Rather, in the rare cases that individuals experience symptoms, these infections should be treated.

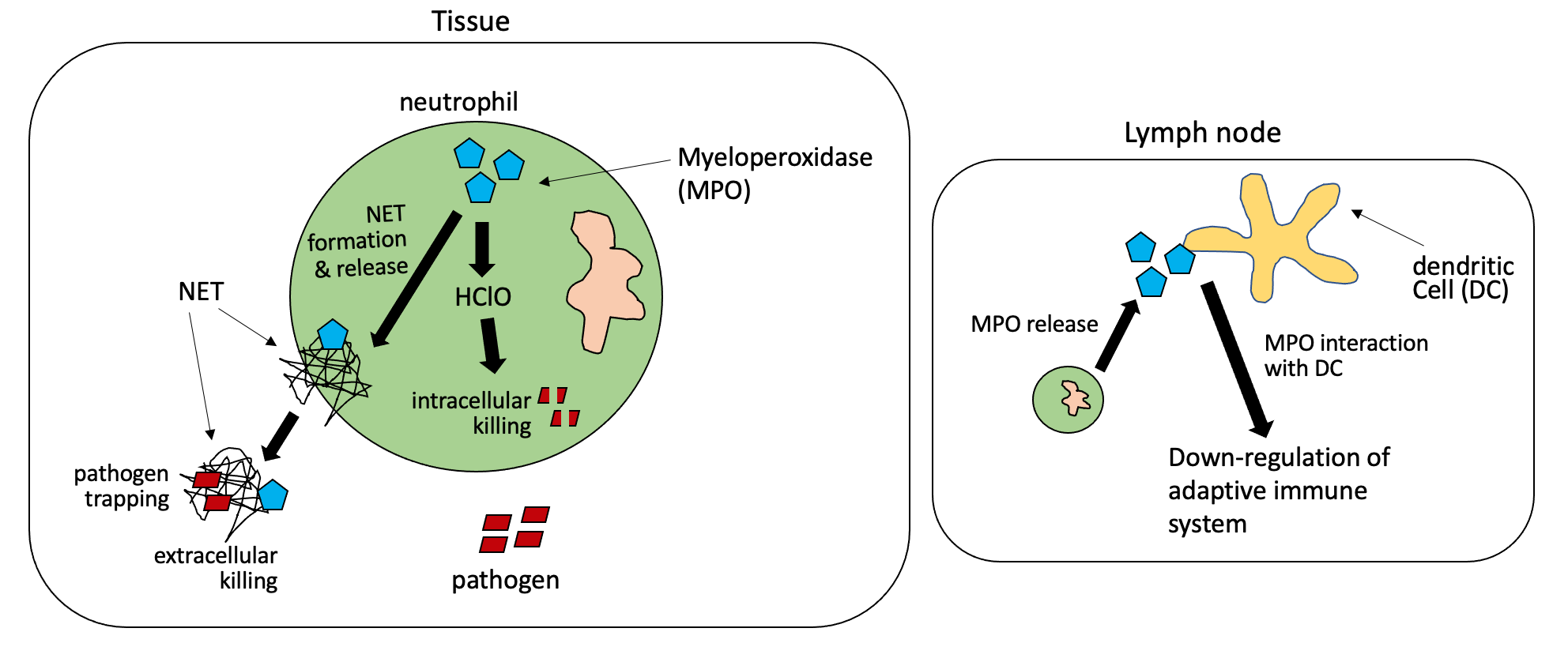
This image demonstrates the role of myeloperoxidase in both the tissue where infection occurs and in the lymph nodes. In myeloperoxidase deficiency, myeloperoxidase is absent, and these functions occur less efficiently or not at all.

== Pathophysiology ==
The innate immune system responds quickly to infection, with neutrophils (a type of white blood cells) being the first responders. Neutrophils enter the site of infection and begin to phagocytose (take up) pathogens. Once engulfed, the neutrophils must then degrade the captured pathogens–a process known as intracellular killing.

One method of intracellular killing which takes place in the phagolysosomes of neutrophils involves the reaction of myeloperoxidase with hydrogen peroxide (H_{2}O_{2}) acquired in the cells from NADPH oxidase through the respiratory bursts. This reaction generates several acidic products including hypochlorous acid (HClO), which can break down pathogens. Bacteria such as Pseudomonas aeruginosa and fungi such as Candida albicans are killed in this manner.

Neutrophils are also involved in killing extracellular pathogens (pathogens outside of the cell) through the release of NETs. These NETs contain myeloperoxidase, among other antimicrobial proteins. Once released outside of the cell, NETs trap pathogens and may in some cases kill them. Although myeloperoxidase is not required for all NET formation/release, NETs are only formed and released in response to Candida albicans when myeloperoxidase is present. Myeloperoxidase proteins in NETs can still react with H_{2}O_{2} to form HClO and break down some extracellular pathogens. In myeloperoxidase deficient individuals, this extracellular pathogen killing doesn't typically occur.

Finally, during infection, neutrophils can migrate to the lymph nodes, where they deposit myeloperoxidase. Although the mechanisms of this process aren't well understood, there is evidence that this extracellular myeloperoxidase interacts with dendritic cells (cells of the adaptive immune system) in the lymph nodes, leading to a decrease in adaptive immune system activity in response to infection.

== Presentation ==
About 1:1,000 to 1:4,000 individuals in the United States and Europe and 1:55,000 individuals in Japan experience myeloperoxidase deficiency. The most common symptom of myeloperoxidase deficiency is frequent infections, particularly by the fungus Candida albicans. This symptom is especially frequent in individuals who also experience diabetes mellitus.

The majority of myeloperoxidase-deficient individuals, however, do not display any significant tendencies towards chronic infections from most bacteria. This is likely due to the fact that the absence of myeloperoxidase leads to increased neutrophil phagocytosis and degranulation as well as increased development of the adaptive immune system. That is, other aspects of the immune system typically compensate for the lack of myeloperoxidase, leading to relatively mild symptoms.

Nonetheless, myeloperoxidase-deficient individuals have been found to experience more chronic inflammatory conditions (such as rheumatoid arthritis, pulmonary/skin inflammation, kidney/heart disease, etc.) than individuals with sufficient myeloperoxidase. Researchers hypothesize this may be a result of heightened adaptive immune system activity in individuals with myeloperoxidase deficiency. There is also some evidence that congenital myeloperoxidase deficiency is correlated with higher rates of malignant tumors.

== Types ==
MPO deficiency is broken down into two categories: primary/congenital and secondary/acquired. Primary MPO deficiency is an autosomal recessive genetic disorder, which is caused by mutations in the myeloperoxidase gene on chromosome 17q23. There are several different known mutations of this gene which all lead to myeloperoxidase deficiency.

Secondary MPO deficiency, on the other hand, occurs in various clinical situations as a result of hematological neoplasm, disseminated cancers, some drugs, iron deficiency, lead intoxication, thrombotic disease, renal transplantation, severe infectious disease, diabetes mellitus, neuronal lipofuscinosis, or pregnancy. Secondary MPO deficiency is typically partial, meaning only a portion of the affected individual's neutrophils lack functional myeloperoxidase.

== Diagnosis ==
Myeloperoxidase deficiency can be diagnosed via flow cytometry and cytochemical stains. Various devices can divide up leukocyte (white blood cell) populations based on their size and peroxidase activity. Specific stains bind to myeloperoxidase, and individuals who display large, granulated cells without this stain through flow cytometry typically have myeloperoxidase deficiency. In this way, it's apparent when neutrophils are present in an individual but peroxidase activity is absent.

Note, myeloperoxidase deficiency can cause false positives in the diagnosis of chronic granulomatous disease, a condition which includes dysfunctional NADPH oxidase. Both disorders interfere with neutrophils' abilities to kill pathogens through reaction with oxidative species. However, chronic granulomatous disease leads to inadequate H_{2}O_{2} production, while myeloperoxidase deficiency is characterized by a lack of myeloperoxidase to interact with present H_{2}O_{2}. Testing with NADPH oxidase-specific assays can lead to positive results for chronic granulomatous disease and negative results for myeloperoxidase deficiency.

== Treatment ==
Most individuals with myeloperoxidase deficiency do not need regular treatment, as they experience only mild symptoms, if any at all. Continued antibiotic use is not recommended in myeloperoxidase-deficient patients who don't experience recurrent infections.

Acquired myeloperoxidase deficiency typically goes away when the underlying condition is treated. In particular, when myeloperoxidase deficiency is caused by severe iron deficiency, treatment with iron returns myeloperoxidase function to normal.
