= Viljoen–Kallis–Voges syndrome =

- Other names: Microcephaly, short stature, brachydactyly type D, flattened occiput, low-set large ears, prominent nose, kyphoscoliosis and intellectual disability, microcephaly brachydactyly kyphoscoliosis
- Specialty: Medical genetics
- Complications: Intellectual disabilities, learning disabilities
- Usual onset: Birth
- Duration: Life-long
- Causes: Genetic mutation
- Prevention: none
- Prognosis: Good
- Frequency: Very rare, only 3 cases have been reported in medical literature.

Viljoen–Kallis–Voges syndrome, also known as microcephaly-brachydactyly-kyphoscoliosis syndrome, is a very rare genetic disorder which is characterized by severe intellectual disabilities, microcephaly, low height/short stature, brachydactyly type D, flat occiput, down-slanting palpebral fissures, low-set prominent ears, a broad nose, and kyphoscoliosis.

Additional symptoms that appear in at least 80% of affected individuals include decreased muscle mass, dolichocephaly, a high and narrow palate, malar flattening, and a shuffling gait.

This disorder was first discovered in the summer of 1991, by D L Viljoen et al., they described three sisters all over the age of 60 with all of the symptoms described above which were similar to those in Rubenstein–Taybi syndrome. The suspected mode of inheritance is of an autosomal recessive manner.

Viljoen-Kallis-Voges Syndrome is an extremely rare congenital disorder, and the presentation of symptoms may occur at birth or in infancy. Both males and females may be affected and certain individuals of all racial and ethnic groups. A positive family history may be an important risk factor, since it can be inherited. Currently, the genetic cause of this has not been discovered.
