= Morel's ear =

Anatomical variance of the ear

Morel's ear is the complete or partial absence of the helix or antihelix of the outer ear. Named after Bénédict Morel, a French psychiatrist who regarded it as one of the hereditary "stigmata of degeneration" that allowed medical professions to identify the mentally ill.

Marcel Proust referenced Morel's ear in In Search of Lost Time. When Charles Morel says he would like to seduce a virgin, his companion responds first of all with a gesture: "M. de Charlus could not refrain from pinching Morel's ear."
