= Metageria =

- Specialty: Dermatology

Metageria is a cutaneous condition characterized by premature aging.

== See also ==
- Hutchinson–Gilford syndrome
- List of cutaneous conditions
