= Metaphyseal dysostosis-intellectual disability-conductive deafness syndrome =

Genetic disorder

Metaphyseal dysostosis-intellectual disability-conductive deafness syndrome is a very rare genetic disorder which is characterized by dysplasia of the metaphyses, short-limbed dwarfism, mild intellectual disabilities, and conductive hearing loss-associated otitis media. It has been described in 3 siblings born to consanguineous parents from Sicily, Italy.
