= Spastic ataxia-corneal dystrophy syndrome =

- Other names: Bedouin spastic ataxia syndrome, Mousa-Al Din-Al Nassar syndrome and Spastic ataxia-ocular anomalies syndrome
- Spastic ataxia-corneal dystrophy syndrome is inherited in an autosomal recessive manner
- Frequency: 0.0001%

Spastic ataxia-corneal dystrophy syndrome (also known as Bedouin spastic ataxia syndrome) is an autosomally recessive disease. It has been found in an inbred Bedouin family. It was first described in 1986. A member of the family who was first diagnosed with this disease also had Bartter syndrome. It was concluded by its first descriptors Mousa-Al et al. that the disease is different from a disease known as corneal-cerebellar syndrome that had been found in 1985.

Symptoms include spastic ataxia, cataracts, macular corneal dystrophy and nonaxial myopia. Mental development is normal.

== See also ==
- Rare disease
