= Mondini dysplasia =

- Other names: Familial nonsyndromal Mondini dysplasia
- Specialty: Audiology

Mondini dysplasia, also known as Mondini malformation and Mondini defect, is an abnormality of the inner ear that is associated with sensorineural hearing loss.

This deformity was first described in 1791 by Mondini after examining the inner ear of a deaf boy. The Mondini dysplasia describes a cochlea with incomplete partitioning and a reduced number of turns, an enlarged vestibular aqueduct and a dilated vestibule. A normal cochlea has two and a half turns, a cochlea with Mondini dysplasia has one and a half turns; the basal turns being normally formed with a dilated or cystic apical turn to the cochlear. The hearing loss can deteriorate over time either gradually or in a step-wise fashion, or may be profound from birth.

Hearing loss associated with Mondini dysplasia may first become manifest in childhood or early adult life. Some children may pass newborn hearing screen to lose hearing in infancy but others present with a hearing loss at birth. Hearing loss is often progressive and because of the associated widened vestibular aqueduct may progress in a step-wise fashion associated with minor head trauma. Vestibular function is also often affected. While the hearing loss is sensorineural a conductive element may exist probably because of the third window effect of the widened vestibular aqueduct. The Mondini dysplasia can occur in cases of Pendred Syndrome and Branchio-oto-renal syndrome and in other syndromes, but can occur in non-syndromic deafness.
