= Myositis ossificans =

Disease in which muscle converts into bone

Myositis ossificans progressiva
- Fibrodysplasia ossificans progressiva
- Specialty: Rheumatology

Myositis ossificans comprises two syndromes characterized by heterotopic ossification (calcification) of muscle. In 2020, the World Health Organization classified myositis ossificans together with fibro-osseous pseudotumor of digits as a single specific entity in the category of fibroblastic and myofibroblastic tumors.

== Classification ==
- In the first, and by far most common type, nonhereditary myositis ossificans (commonly referred to simply as "myositis ossificans", as in the remainder of this article), calcifications occur at the site of injured muscle, most commonly in the arms or in the quadriceps of the thighs.
  - The term myositis ossificans traumatica is sometimes used when the condition is due to trauma. Also myositis ossificans circumscripta is another synonym of myositis ossificans traumatica refers to the new extraosseous bone that appears after trauma.
- The second condition, myositis ossificans progressiva (also referred to as fibrodysplasia ossificans progressiva) is an inherited affliction, autosomal dominant pattern, in which the ossification can occur without injury, and typically grows in a predictable pattern. Although this disorder can be passed to offspring by those afflicted with FOP, it is also classified as nonhereditary, as it is most often attributed to a spontaneous genetic mutation upon conception.

Most (i.e. 80%) ossifications arise in the thigh or arm, and are caused by a premature return to activity after an injury. Other sites include intercostal spaces, erector spinae, pectoralis muscles, glutei, and the chest. On planar x-ray, hazy densities are sometimes noted approximately one month after injury, while the denser opacities eventually seen may not be apparent until two months have passed.

== Pathophysiology ==
The exact mechanism of myositis ossificans is not clear. Inappropriate response of stem cells in the bone against the injury or inflammation causes inappropriate differentiation of fibroblasts into osteogenic cells. When a skeletal muscle is injured, inflammatory cytokines (Bone morphogenetic protein 2, Bone morphogenetic protein 4, and Transforming growth factor) are released. These cytokines stimulate the endothelial cells of the blood vessels to transform into mesenchymal stem cells. These mesenchymal stem cells then differentiate into chondrocytes, and osteoblasts, resulting in bone formation in soft tissues.

The process of myositis ossificans can be divided into three stages: early, intermediate, and mature. The early phase occurs in the first four weeks of injury with inflammatory phase of bone formation. This is followed by intermediate phase of bone formation (four to eight weeks following injury) where calcification started to occur and is visible on X-rays. During the maturation phase, mature bone started to form. As the maturation continues, the bone will consolidate in the coming months and subsequently bone regression occurs.

== Diagnosis ==
=== Sonographic diagnosis ===
Calcification is typically depicted 2 weeks earlier by ultrasound (US) when compared to radiographs. The lesion develops in two distinct stages with different presentations at US. In the early stage, termed immature, it depicts a non-specific soft tissue mass that ranges from a hypoechoic area with an outer sheet-like hyperechoic peripheral rim to a highly echogenic area with variable shadowing. In the late stage, termed mature, myositis ossificans is depicted as an elongated calcific deposit that is aligned with the long-axis of the muscle, exhibits acoustic shadowing, and has no soft tissue mass associated. US may suggest the diagnosis at early stage, but imaging features need to evolve with successive maturation of the lesion and formation of the characteristic late stage changes before they become pathognomonic.

The differential diagnosis includes many tumoral and nontumoral pathologies. A main concern is to differentiate early myositis ossificans from malignant soft-tissue tumors, and the latter is suggested by a fast-growing process. If clinical or sonographic findings are dubious and extraosseous sarcoma is suspected, biopsy should be performed. At histology, detection of the typical zonal phenomenon is diagnostic of myositis ossificans, though microscopic findings may be misleading during the early stage.

=== Radiologic diagnosis ===
The radiological features of myositis ossificans are ‘faint soft tissue calcification within 2–6 weeks, (may have well-defined bony margins by 8 weeks) separated from periosteum by lucent zone and on CT, the characteristic feature is peripheral ossification’.

== Management ==
Since myositis ossificians is more common in those with bleeding disorders, the formation of bone in soft tissue is thought to be associated with haematoma formation. As the calcifications will typically resolve after a period of time, non-surgical treatment is encouraged to minimize the unpleasant symptoms and maximize the function of the affected limb.

Following a skeletal muscle injury, the affected limb should be immobilized with bed rest, ice therapy, compression, and elevation of the affected limb. Crutches can be used for ambulation while providing adequate rest for the affected limb and minimizing the haematoma formation. Ice therapy for 15 to 20 minutes every 30 to 60 minutes is useful to reduce the skeletal muscle blood flow by 50%. Aggressive limb physiotherapy is not recommended at this stage to prevent the worsening of symptoms. After 48 to 72 hours, range of motion exercise can be introduced as long as the range of motion is not painful. If the lesion becomes more mature, active range of motion and resistance strengthening exercises are useful in maintaining joint function.

Surgical excision is reserved for those who failed the non-surgical treatment, those with intolerable pain, compression of the neurovascular structures, or limitation of the range of motion of the joint which affects the activities of daily living. Surgery is only performed after 6 to 18 months following injury because surgery does not alter the bone maturation process. If a surgery is performed too early, it may predispose to recurrence. However, the optimum timing for surgery and the rate of recurrence following early surgery is controversial because some studies have shown that early surgery does reduce the rate of recurrence.

For those who had total hip replacement or total hip arthroplasty, postoperative single low-dose radiation with three weeks of oral indomethacin regimen will be preventive for heterotopic ossification. Radiation therapy is also effective in preventing recurrence in those who had done operative excision of heterotopic ossification of the elbow.
