= Short-stature homeobox gene =

Mammalian protein found in Homo sapiens

SHOX

Identifiers
- Aliases: SHOX, GCFX, PHOG, SHOXY, SS, short stature homeobox
- External IDs: OMIM: 312865, 400020; GeneCards: SHOX
Gene ontology
Molecular function	DNA-binding transcription factor activity; DNA binding; protein binding; DNA-binding transcription activator activity, RNA polymerase II-specific; sequence-specific DNA binding; DNA-binding transcription factor activity, RNA polymerase II-specific
Cellular component	nucleus; nucleoplasm; intracellular membrane-bounded organelle
Biological process	multicellular organism development; skeletal system development; regulation of transcription, DNA-templated; transcription by RNA polymerase II; transcription, DNA-templated; positive regulation of transcription by RNA polymerase II
Sources:Amigo / QuickGO
Orthologs
Databases	NCBI: entry; OMA: entry
Species	Human	Mouse
Entrez	6473	n/a
Ensembl	ENSG00000185960	n/a
UniProt	O15266	n/a
RefSeq (mRNA)	n/a	n/a
RefSeq (protein)	NP_000442; NP_006874	n/a
Location (UCSC)	n/a	n/a
PubMed search		n/a
- Wikidata
View/Edit Human

The short-stature homeobox gene (SHOX), also known as short-stature-homeobox-containing gene, is a gene located on both the X and Y chromosomes, which is associated with short stature in humans if mutated or present in only one copy (haploinsufficiency).

== Pathology ==
SHOX was first found during a search for the cause of short stature in women with Turner syndrome, where there is loss of genetic material from the X chromosome, typically by loss of one entire X chromosome.

Since its discovery, the gene has been found to play a role in idiopathic short stature, Léri-Weill dyschondrosteosis, and Langer mesomelic dysplasia.

Gene dosage effects of extra copies of SHOX may be a cause of the increased stature seen in other sex chromosome aneuploidy conditions such as triple X, XYY, Klinefelter, XXYY and similar syndromes.

== Genetics and function ==
SHOX is composed of 6 different exons and is located in the pseudoautosomal region 1 (PAR1) of the X chromosome (Xp22.33) and Y chromosome. Since genes in PAR escape X inactivation, their dosage changes with sex chromosome aneuploidies such as Turner.

Similar genes are present in a variety of animals and insects.

It is a homeobox gene, meaning that it helps to regulate development.
