= Léri–Weill dyschondrosteosis =

- Other names: LWD
- Léri–Weill dyschondrosteosis is inherited in an autosomal dominant manner
- Specialty: Medical genetics

Léri–Weill dyschondrosteosis or LWD is a rare pseudoautosomal dominant genetic disorder which results in dwarfism with short forearms and legs (mesomelic dwarfism) and a bayonet-like deformity of the forearms (Madelung's deformity).

== Causes ==
It is caused by mutations in the short-stature homeobox gene found in the pseudoautosomal region PAR1 of the X and Y chromosomes, at band Xp22.33 or Yp11.32.

SHOX gene deletions have been identified as the major cause of Leri–Weill syndrome.

Leri–Weill dyschondrosteosis is characterized by mesomelic short stature, with bowing of the radius more so than the ulna in the forearms and bowing of the tibia while sparing the fibula.

== Diagnosis ==
Diagnosis is made following genetic blood testing.

== Treatment ==
There is currently no known treatment for Leri-Weill dyschondrosteosis.

== History ==
LWD was first described in 1929 by André Léri and Jean A. Weill.
