= Psychomotor retardation =

Slowing down of thought and reduction of physical movement

- Other names: Psychomotor impairment, motormental retardation, psychomotor slowing
- Specialty: Psychiatry

Psychomotor retardation involves a slowing down of thought and a reduction of physical movements in an individual. It can cause a visible slowing of physical and emotional reactions, including speech and affect.

Psychomotor retardation is most commonly seen in people with major depression and in the depressed phase of bipolar disorder; it is also associated with the adverse effects of certain drugs, such as benzodiazepines.

== Causes ==
- Psychiatric disorders: anxiety disorders, bipolar disorder, eating disorders, schizophrenia, severe depression, etc.
- Psychiatric medicines (if taken as prescribed or improperly, overdosed, or mixed with alcohol)
- Parkinson's disease
- Genetic disorders: Qazi–Markouizos syndrome, Say–Meyer syndrome, Tranebjaerg-Svejgaard syndrome, Wiedemann–Steiner syndrome, Wilson's disease, etc.

== Examples ==
Examples of psychomotor retardation include the following:

In schizophrenia, activity level may vary from psychomotor retardation to agitation; the patient experiences periods of listlessness and may be unresponsive, and at the next moment be active and energetic.

== See also ==
- Psychomotor learning
- Psychomotor agitation
- Disorders of diminished motivation
