= Mesomelia =

Abnormal shortness of the forearms and lower legs

Mesomelia refers to conditions in which the middle parts of limbs are disproportionately short. When applied to skeletal dysplasias, mesomelic dwarfism describes generalised shortening of the forearms and lower legs. This is in contrast to rhizomelic dwarfism in which the upper portions of limbs are short such as in achondroplasia.

Forms of mesomelic dwarfism currently described include:

- Langer mesomelic dysplasia
- Ellis–van Creveld syndrome
- Robinow syndrome
- Léri–Weill dyschondrosteosis
