= Polysyndactyly =

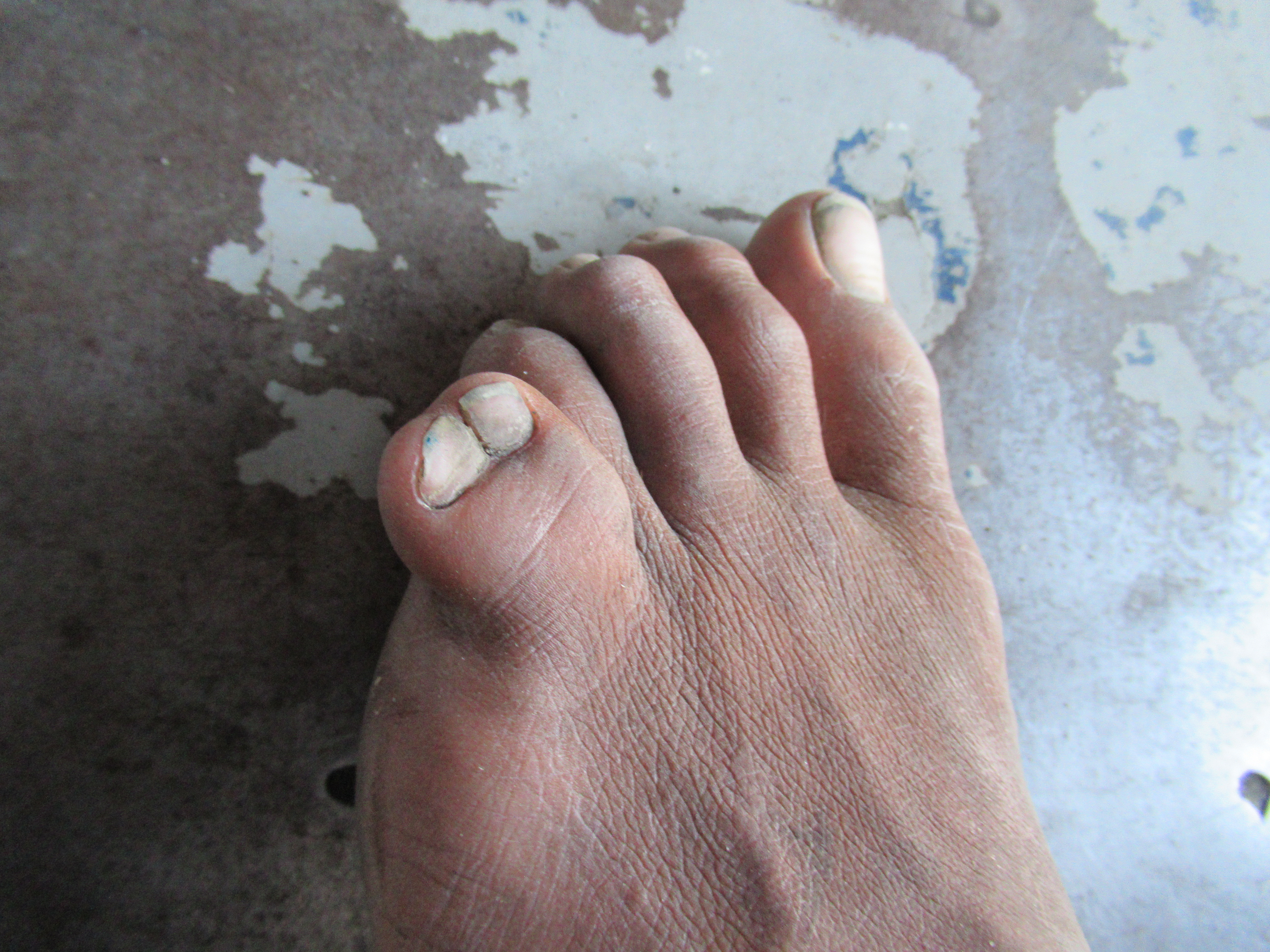
- Foot polysyndactyly
- Specialty: Medical genetics

Polysyndactyly is a congenital anomaly, combining polydactyly and syndactyly, in which affected individuals have an extra finger or toe that is connected, via fusing or webbing, to an adjacent digit.

== Signs and symptoms ==
Presentations of polysyndactyly vary in location and size of the duplicated digit, and in the extent of webbing between digits.

The extra digit is most commonly postaxial, on the same side as the pinky or little toe. Preaxial polysyndactyly, in which the duplicated digit is on the side of the thumb or big toe, is less common. Crossed polysyndactyly, in which polysyndactyly is present on the hand and foot, and is preaxial on one and postaxial on the other, is extremely rare and often occurs with other genetic disorders.

Polysyndactyly may be classified by the level of duplication. The extra digit may be small and comprise only soft tissue, but usually includes at least one bone, most commonly the distal and middle phalanges. Partial or complete duplication of the proximal phalanx, metacarpal or metatarsal can also occur.

Fusing of the extra digit may be incomplete, giving the appearance of the extra digit being partially connected to the (otherwise normal) adjacent digit. However, complete fusion of the extra digit to the adjacent digit, via soft tissue and skin, is more common.

== Causes ==
Polysyndactyly is typically inherited, in an autosomal dominant pattern. The specific mutations leading to polysyndactyly are varied between among types of the condition and different families. However, many cases are caused by changes to genetic elements affecting the signaling molecule Sonic hedgehog (SHH). Primarily, mutations are found in the zone of polarizing activity regulatory sequence, or ZRS, that controls the expression of SHH in developing limbs. Many cases of polysyndactyly are the result of duplications of the ZRS or the nearby pre-ZRS region.

Polysyndactyly can be associated with the presence of other genetic disorders. It is a hallmark of Carpenter syndrome, an autosomal recessive disorder that is also associated with craniosynostosis, obesity, short stature, and other malformations. People with other syndromes, including Pallister–Hall syndrome and Greig cephalopolysyndactyly syndrome may also display polysyndactyly of varying severity.

Polysyndactyly has full penetrance but variable expressivity; individuals who possess an allele for polysyndactyly may have a different severity of the condition. This has been seen in case studies where a parent has hexadactyly in their 4th and 5th fingers but their child has hexadactyly in their 1st, 2nd, 3rd and 4th fingers.

== Diagnosis ==
Polysyndactyly can be diagnosed in utero through sonographic and genetic testing, though sonography may be preferred due to the cost and risk associated with genetic testing. Ultrasounds, typically done at the 14th to 16th week of pregnancy, can detect the presence of extra metacarpals, metatarsals, or phalanges. Genetic testing of the fetus examines disruptions in the HOXD13 gene at 2q31-q32 and in the GLI3 gene at 7p13. These genomic regions regulate proliferation and differentiation in the limb bud, and can lead to phenotypic anomalies, including polysyndactyly, if mutated. Postnatally, polysyndactyly is diagnosed by observation of an extra digit and X-rays to confirm the presence of an extra metacarpal, metatarsal, or phalanx.

== Treatment and prognosis ==
Polysyndactyly is treated through surgical excision of the extra digit. The choice of which digit to remove affects post-operative outcomes; factors that must be considered when determining which digit to excise include the neurovascular bundles, angle differences, risks for impaired circulation, post-operative appearance, and residual deformities.

Treatment is generally aimed at normalizing both function and appearance of the affected extremity and, in the case of polysyndactyly of the foot, shoe fit and comfort. The underlying cause of polysyndactyly determines the overall quality of life for individuals diagnosed with this condition. If there are no comorbid or underlying genetic conditions, surgical removal of the extra digit generally results in a high quality of life. Parents of children with polysyndactyly have reported high physical, social, emotional, and school functioning and good psychosocial health after removal of the extra digit.
