= Polyonychia =

Presence of two or more finger/toe nails on a single finger/toe

- Other names: supernumerary nails of the fingers and toes
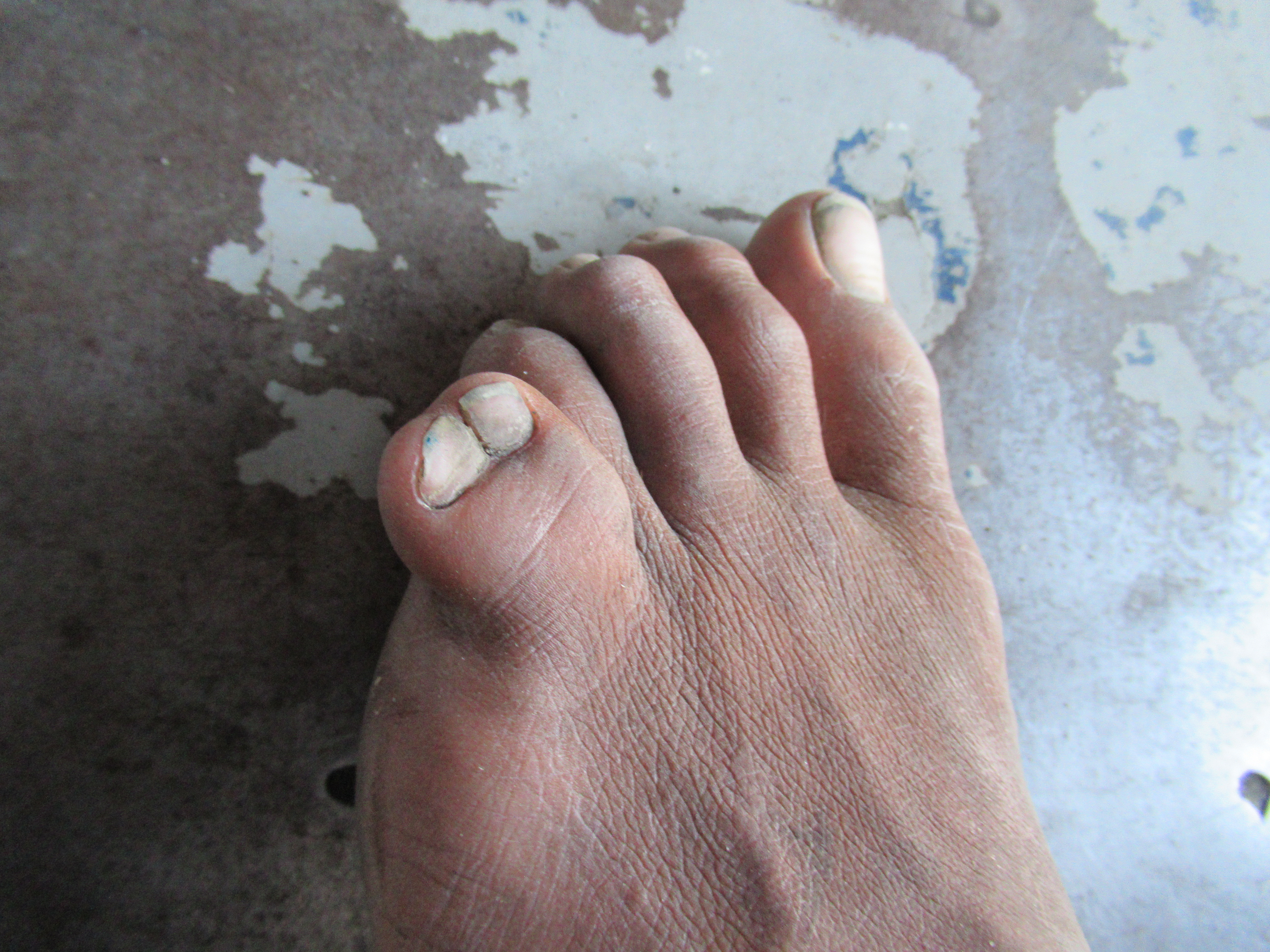
- Polyonychia from congenital polysyndactyly
- Specialty: Medical genetics
- Symptoms: Having two or more finger/toenails on a single digit
- Complications: Social insecurity
- Usual onset: Birth (congenital), post-traumatic (acquired)
- Duration: Life-long (unless it's corrected)
- Treatment: Plastic surgery
- Prognosis: Good
- Frequency: polydactyly: 1 in 500-1,000 live births syndactyly: 1 in 2,500-3,000 births
- Deaths: None

Polyonychia also known as supernumerary nails is a condition in which two or more nails grow in the same finger or toe.

== Signs and symptoms ==
The signs/symptoms of polyonychia are very easy to detect: two or more nails growing on the same finger or toe.

The nails can either be separate, small nails (micronychia) or one wide, almost complete nail, the digit affected could also be wider than normal

== Causes ==
Polyonychia is generally caused by a congenital duplication of the distal phalange of the affected digit(s), this can be caused by congenital factors (sporadic without a genetic link) or by genetic factors (sporadic or familial with genetic link).

It can also be caused by polysyndactyly, which is characterized as one normal digit being connected/webbed (syndactyly) to an extra digit (polydactyly).

Polyonychia can also be acquired, such as after an accident that affected the nail bed causing it to split. This type of polyonychia is just referred to as "post-traumatic split nail"

Polyonychia's syndromic causes include:

- Isolated congenital onychodysplasia

Polyonychia's non-syndromic causes include:

- Polyphalangism (more specifically of the distal phalange)
- Polysyndactyly

== See also ==
- Polydactyly
- Syndactyly
- Polysyndactyly
- Accessory nail of the fifth toe
