= Mirror polydactyly-vertebral segmentation-limb defects syndrome =

- Specialty: Medical genetics
- Frequency: very rare, only 4 cases from 4 families in Spain have been described in medical literature
- Deaths: -

Mirror polydactyly-vertebral segmentation-limb defects syndrome is a very rare genetic disorder which is characterized by bilateral symmetrical (mirror) polydactyly, vertebral anomalies and diverse limb deficiencies. It has been described in four un-related patients from Spain, which were brought to medical attention by a program called Spanish Collaborative Study of Congenital Malformations.
