= Judith Goslin Hall =

American-Canadian physician (born 1939)

Judith Goslin Hall OC FRSC FCAHS
- Born: July 3, 1939 (age 87); Boston, Massachusetts, US
- Education: Wellesley College, University of Washington, Johns Hopkins Hospital
- Known for: Work on the Sheldon-Hall syndrome and other abnormalities
- Awards: Order of Canada, Canadian Medical Hall of Fame
- Scientific career
- Fields: Pediatrician, clinical geneticist and dysmorphologist
- Workplaces: University of Washington School of Medicine, University of British Columbia

Judith Goslin Hall OC FRSC FCAHS (born July 3, 1939) is a pediatrician, clinical geneticist and dysmorphologist who is a dual citizen of the United States and Canada.

== Early life and education ==
The daughter of a minister, Judith Goslin Hall was born on July 3, 1939, in Boston, Massachusetts. She graduated from Garfield High School in Seattle and then attended Wellesley College in Wellesley, Mass. from which she earned her Bachelor of Arts degree in 1961.

She went to medical school in Seattle at the University of Washington, from which she received an MD, from which she received an MD degree in 1966. She was also awarded an MS degree in Genetics from the University of Washington. She did her Pediatric training at Johns Hopkins Hospital, and did her fellowships in Medical Genetics and Pediatric Endocrinology.

== Career ==
In 1972, she returned to the University of Washington School of Medicine and was given a joint appointment in the Departments of Pediatrics and Medicine as, successively, assistant, associate and full professor. She also gained additional depth of knowledge concerning congenital malformations by working in Seattle with the pioneer dysmorphologist, David W. Smith (1926–1981).

In 1981, Hall was named professor of medical genetics at the University of British Columbiadegree in 1966. and the Director of the Genetics Services for British Columbia. From 1990 to 2000, she was also Professor and head of the Department of Paediatrics at the University of British Columbia and BC Children's Hospital.

In 1988 she received a Killam Senior Fellowship for a sabbatical year at Oxford University, UK. During 2001, she was a Distinguished Fellow at Christ's College, Cambridge University, UK.

From 1990 to 2000, she was Chair of Pediatrics at the University of British Columbia, being involved in paediatric education and paediatric physician resource planning.

In 2005, she became an Emerita Professor at the University of British Columbia, engaged in Associations of Professors Emeriti (later the UBC Emeritus College), and served as the president in 2011–2012.

== Research contributions ==
Hall's research has been far-ranging in the areas of congenital malformations including neural tube defects, the genetics of short stature, the mechanisms of disease such as mosaicism and imprinting, the natural history of genetic disorders, the genetics of connective tissue disorders such as arthrogryposis, and monozygotic (identical) twins. She has contributed to the knowledge of a number of syndromes. Her name is associated with the Hall type of pseudoachondroplasia (a severe form of dwarfism with short limbs), Sheldon-Hall syndrome, and the Hall-Pallister syndrome (hamartoma in the hypothalamus tract, hypopituitarism, imperforate anus and polydactyly). Contributed to resource planning, career development, and continuing contributions of older academics. She described several forms of arthrogryposis and helped to define over 450 types.

== Awards ==
Hall has received a number of honors, including alumni awards from Garfield High School, Wellesley College, the University of Washington School of Medicine, and the University of British Columbia. In 1998, she was made an Officer of the Order of Canada as "a leader and world authority in both genetics and pediatrics" and having "contributed to the development of resources and services essential to coping with genetic illnesses" In 2011, she became a Fellow of the Royal Society of Canada. In 2015, Hall was inducted into the Canadian Medical Hall of Fame and a Fellow of the Canadian Academy of Health Sciences.

Hall is quoted as saying, with regard to her recognition, that

To me, high achievement is not the number of publications but being a successful female in a world of professional men. And by that I mean caring more about peacemaking and nurturing the individual and the environment than success, winning, owning or directing.

== See also ==
- Snatiation
