= SUFU =

Protein-coding gene in the species Homo sapiens

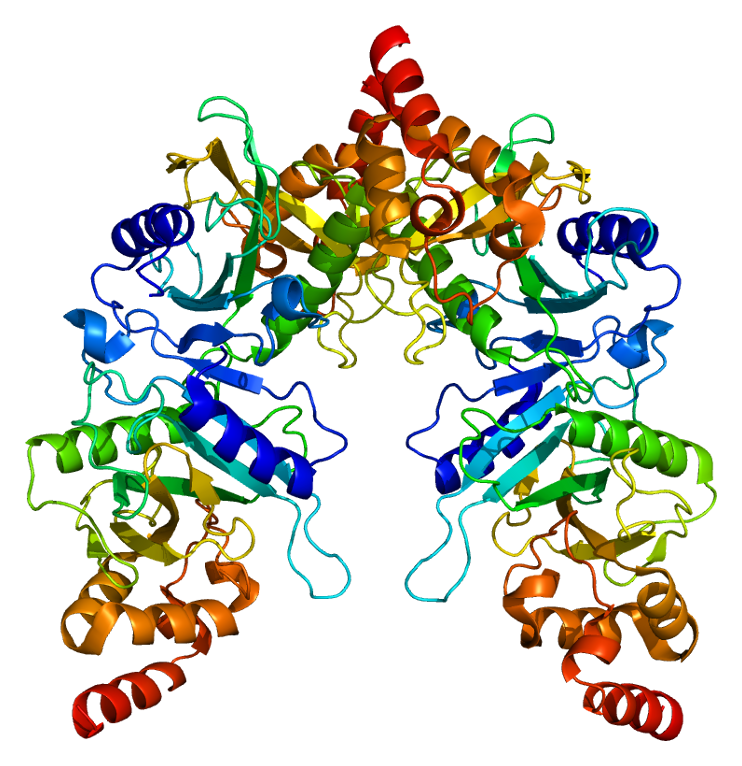
Available structures
PDB	Ortholog search: PDBe RCSB
PDB	List of PDB id codes 1M1L, 4BL8, 4BL9, 4BLA, 4BLB, 4BLD, 4KM8, 4KM9, 4KMD, 4KMH

Identifiers
- Aliases: SUFU, PRO1280, SUFUH, SUFUXL, SUFU negative regulator of hedgehog signaling, JBTS32
- External IDs: OMIM: 607035; MGI: 1345643; HomoloGene: 9262; GeneCards: SUFU; OMA:SUFU - orthologs

Gene location (Human)
Chr.	Chromosome 10 (human)
Band	10q24.32	Start	102,503,972 bp
Band	10q24.32	End	102,633,535 bp

Gene location (Mouse)
Chr.	Chromosome 19 (mouse)
Band	19 C3|19 38.85 cM	Start	46,385,335 bp
Band	19 C3|19 38.85 cM	End	46,477,243 bp
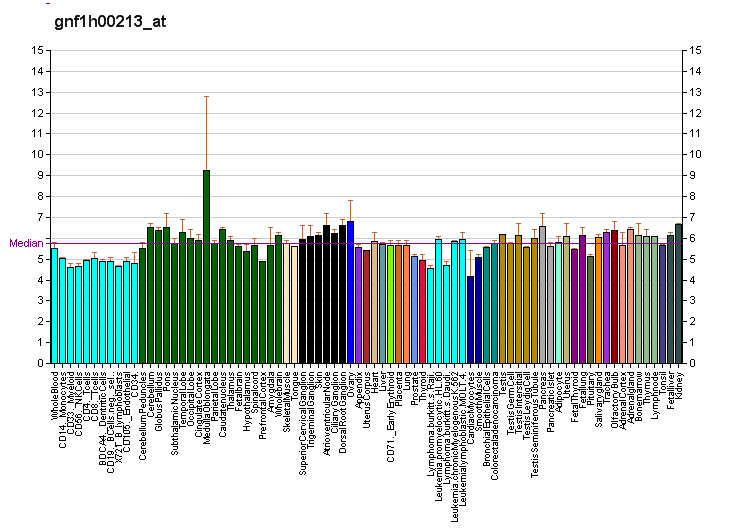
RNA expression pattern
Bgee	Human / Mouse (ortholog); Top expressed in: skin of arm; nipple; body of tongue; vein; stromal cell of endometrium; synovial membrane; mucosa of pharynx; saphenous vein; trigeminal ganglion; internal globus pallidus / Top expressed in: otic vesicle; seminiferous tubule; saccule; otic placode; secondary oocyte; zygote; primary oocyte; spermatogonium; epiblast; yolk sac; More reference expression data
BioGPS	More reference expression data
Gene ontology
Molecular function	beta-catenin binding; transcription corepressor activity; transcription factor binding; signal transducer activity; protein binding; protein kinase binding
Cellular component	cytosol; cilium; ciliary base; ciliary tip; nucleus; cytoplasm
Biological process	skeletal system development; regulation of transcription, DNA-templated; ventricular septum development; smoothened signaling pathway involved in ventral spinal cord interneuron specification; negative regulation of smoothened signaling pathway involved in dorsal/ventral neural tube patterning; spinal cord dorsal/ventral patterning; negative regulation of transcription by RNA polymerase II; coronary vasculature development; negative regulation of DNA-binding transcription factor activity; negative regulation of osteoblast differentiation; proteolysis; heart looping; aorta development; neural tube closure; determination of left/right symmetry; smoothened signaling pathway involved in spinal cord motor neuron cell fate specification; negative regulation of ubiquitin-dependent protein catabolic process; signal transduction; skin development; multicellular organism development; cytoplasmic sequestering of transcription factor; negative regulation of protein import into nucleus; negative regulation of smoothened signaling pathway
Sources:Amigo / QuickGO
Orthologs
Species	Human	Mouse
Entrez	51684	24069
Ensembl	ENSG00000107882	ENSMUSG00000025231
UniProt	Q9UMX1	Q9Z0P7
RefSeq (mRNA)	NM_001178133; NM_016169	NM_001025391; NM_015752
RefSeq (protein)	NP_001171604; NP_057253	NP_001020562; NP_056567
Location (UCSC)	Chr 10: 102.5 – 102.63 Mb	Chr 19: 46.39 – 46.48 Mb
PubMed search
- Wikidata
View/Edit Human	View/Edit Mouse

Suppressor of fused homolog is a protein that in humans is encoded by the SUFU gene. In molecular biology, the protein domain suppressor of fused protein (Sufu) has an important role in the cell. The Sufu is important in negatively regulating an important signalling pathway in the cell, the Hedgehog signalling pathway (HH). This particular pathway is crucial in embryonic development. There are several homologues of Sufu, found in a wide variety of organisms.

== Function ==
SUFU encodes a component of the sonic hedgehog (SHH) / patched (PTCH) signaling pathway. Mutations in genes encoding components of this pathway are deleterious for normal development and are associated with cancer-predisposing syndromes (e.g., holoprosencephaly, HPE3, basal cell nevus syndrome, BCNS, and Greig cephalopolysyndactyly syndrome, GCPS).Sufu has also been found to have a crucial role in tumour suppression. To be more specific, it has a tumour-suppressor gene that predisposes, or in other words makes individuals more susceptible to medulloblastoma, because it modulates the SHH signalling pathway. The N-terminal domain, which this entry refers to contains Gli transcription factors.

== Interactions ==
SUFU has been shown to interact with GLI1, GLI3 and PEX26.

== Conservation ==
The human ortholog of Drosophila suppressor of fused, has a conserved sequence, this means that particular amino acids have remained the same throughout evolution. Consequently, they have very similar roles in repressing Hedgehog signalling. It represses the Gli and Ci transcription factors of the Hedgehog pathway, and functions by binding to these proteins and preventing their translocation to the nucleus. Homologues of Sufu have been found in bacteria. However their function remains to be elucidated.

== Structure ==
Sufu is actually protein that contains two domains. In eukaryotic Sufu, an additional domain is found at the C terminus of the protein. This protein domain also binds to the C-terminal domain of the Gli/Ci transcription factors, inhibiting their activity.

== Genes ==
Human gene that encodes SUFU, also named SUFU, is found to be localized on chromosome 10q24–25, and contains 12 exons.
