= Synpolydactyly =

Genetic disorder of the fingers and toes

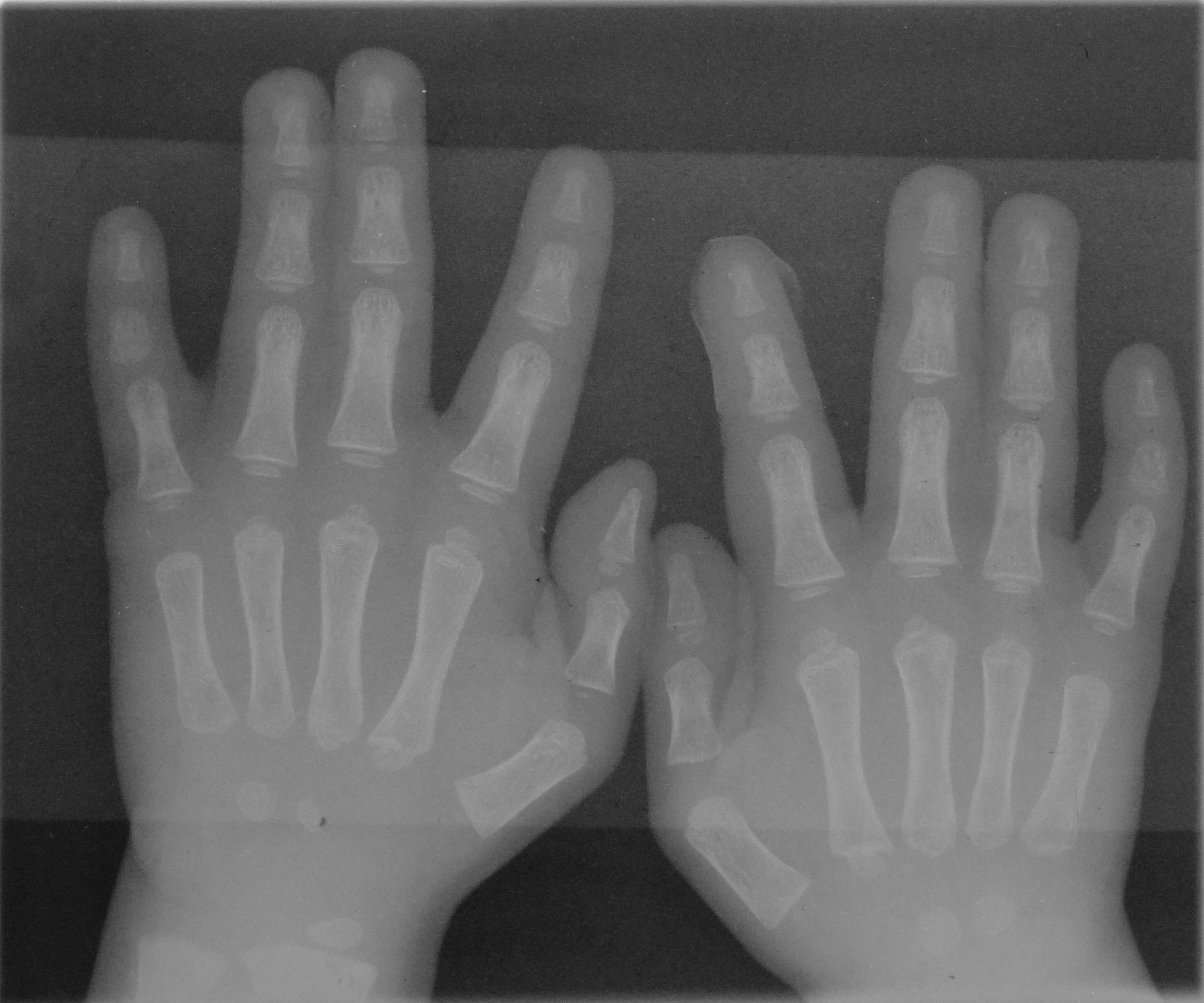
Synpolydactyly is a combination of syndactyly and polydactyly. This image shows the hand morphology of an individual with syndactyly.

Synpolydactyly (SPD) is a joint presentation of syndactyly (fusion of digits) and polydactyly (production of supernumerary digits). SPD affects both hands and feet, often occurring symmetrically on both body sides. This is often a result of a mutation in the HOXD13 gene, as HOXD genes are necessary in early limb bud development and specification of the limbs.

== Genetics ==
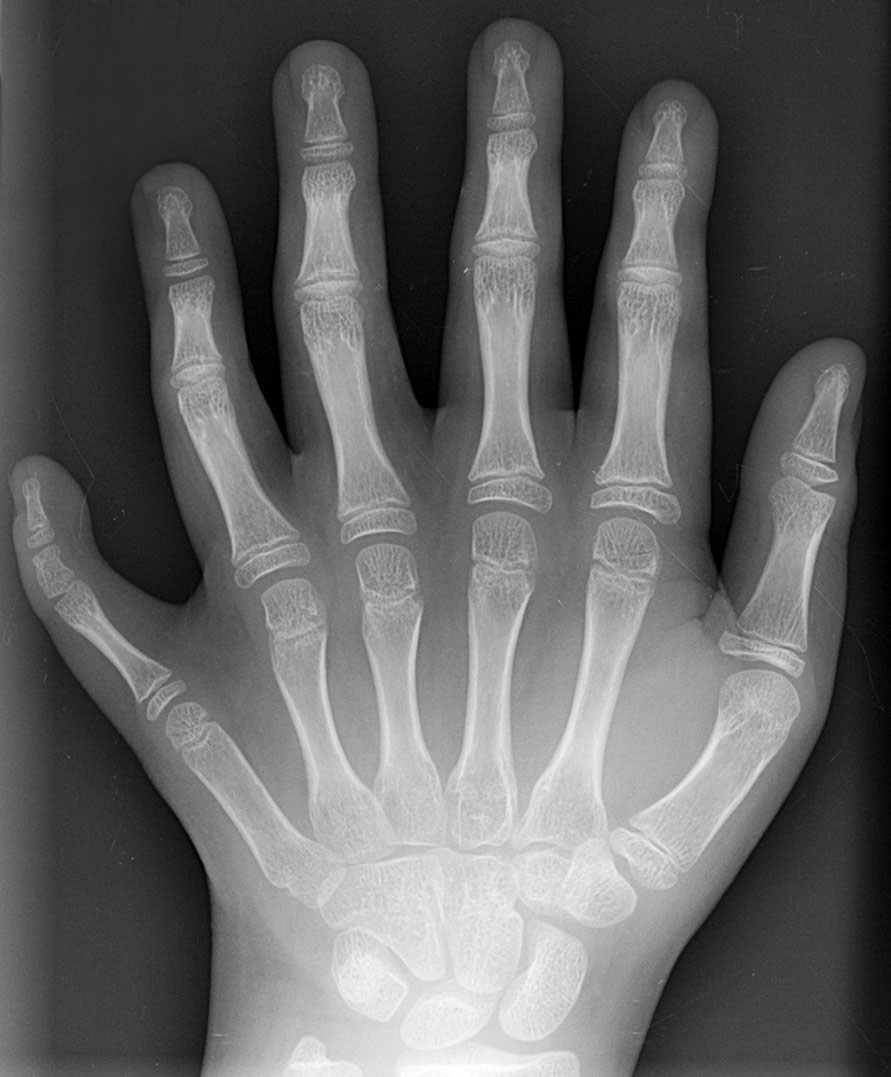
Synpolydactyly is a combination of syndactyly and polydactyly. This image shows the hand morphology of an individual with polydactyly.

SPD is inherited in an autosomal dominant pattern, meaning that an individual only needs to inherit one copy of the affected gene, also known as an allele, from either parent to potentially develop the condition. However, not everyone who inherits the affected allele will show symptoms (incomplete penetrance)., and the symptoms can vary greatly in type and severity among those who are affected (variable expressivity).

The most studied variant, SPD1, is commonly caused by an increase in polyalanine repeats at the start of the HOXD13 gene. This likely disrupts proper protein function, as polyalanine consists of alanine amino acids, which make up proteins. The number of repeats have been found to be related to the degree to which the individual is affected. For 6 polyalanine residues or less, the effects are mild. However, a larger number of polyalanine repeats in the gene causes more severe effects.

Over the past years genetic changes causing the HOXD13 gene to be shorter than normal have also been found among individuals. More recently, research has found a single change in the code for the HOXD13 gene present in a family with synpolydactyly. The study suggests that this genetic change causes an increase in osteoclasts, which are cells that break down bone.This is still an emerging area of research.

== Symptoms ==
Synpolydactyly type 1 (SPD1), also known as syndactyly type II, is a genetic limb disorder caused by inheritance of at least one rare allele of the HOXD13 gene.

In heterozygous cases, where individuals have one rare HOXD13 allele, common symptoms include fused third and fourth fingers, sometimes with an extra small finger within the webbing. The feet may show skin webbing between the fourth and fifth toes. However, not all carriers display symptoms, a phenomenon known as incomplete penetrance.

In homozygous cases, where individuals have two rare HOXD13 alleles, they experience finger fusions, as well as more severe symptoms such as significantly shortened hand and toe bones, and the big toe can be noticeably long and angled inward. Additionally, the metacarpal bones (hand) may take on the shape of carpal bones (wrist). These traits often include finger fusions but can vary widely and overlap with symptoms of synpolydactyly, thus no single feature defines SPD1.

SPD1 symptoms vary widely among individuals and can be grouped into varying levels of severity: mild features, such as inward curvature of the pinky finger in some heterozygous cases, common SPD1 traits like fusion of the third and fourth fingers and extra digits that appear in both heterozygous and some homozygous individuals, and severe symptoms like multiple fused fingers and shortened bones found only in homozygous cases. This range of symptoms suggests variable expressivity, indicating that additional genetic or environmental factors may play a role in influencing how the HOXD13 gene is expressed.

== Management ==
Treatment options for synpolydactyly aim to improve both the functionality and aesthetics of the affected hands and feet. Mild cases may be managed by removing extra digits. Moderate cases often require surgical separation of fused digits and widening of the interdigital space to enhance mobility and appearance. Severe cases may need complex reconstructive procedures, such as repositioning bones and separating them, and skin grafting might also be necessary in some instances.

Post-surgical outcomes typically include reduced pain, improved mobility, and greater independence in daily activities.
