= Malalignment of the nail plate =

- Other names: Congenital malalignment of the great toenails, congenital malalignment syndrome
- Specialty: Dermatology

Malalignment of the nail plate, also known as congenital malalignment of the great toenails or congenital malalignment syndrome, is a congenital malalignment of the nail of the great toe.

The cause of malalignment of the nail plate is unknown. Both extrinsic and genetic factors are suggested to play a role. Malalignment of the nail plate has been reported in twins suggesting genetic factors. Extrinsic factors can include vascular anomalies during fetal life, higher intrauterine pressure, or constriction of the toes by amniotic bands. The diagnosis of malalignment of the nail plate involves clinical examination.

The misaligned nail might be discolored and develop infections. If the nail becomes embedded in the lateral nail fold it can cause pain, inflammation and erythema.

The course of treatment depends on how severe the malalignment is. Conservative treatment and managing complications is often the first choice as spontaneous realignment may occur up to 10 years of age. Surgery can correct or remove the nail.

Although a common condition, it is often misdiagnosed.

== Signs and symptoms ==
Malalignment of the nail plate is defined by the nail plate's lateral deviation along the longitudinal axis as a result of the nail matrix's lateral rotation. There have also been reports of median deviation. Unilateral or bilateral malalignment most commonly affects the halluces, although it can also affect other toenails. The nail matrix experiences recurrent microtrauma, causing the nail plate to spread out in transverse ridges. A common sign is discoloration, which might get worse due to bleeding or infection.

Pseudomonas and/or fungus infections are frequent opportunistic infections of the nail plate. In many cases, the misaligned toenail becomes embedded in the lateral nail fold, causing pain, erythema, and inflammation. Another common consequence that worsens ingrowth is acute or chronic paronychia.

Usually present from birth, the disorder may continue undiagnosed in cases of minor deviation until childhood or puberty, when mechanical stress from activities like dancing or active sports, wearing tight shoes, or other causes causes nail dystrophic alterations.

== Causes ==
It's yet unclear what causes malalignment. Both extrinsic and genetic factors, such as inherited embryological anomalies, have been taken into account.

Nail dystrophy has been reported in monozygotic and dizygotic twins, as well as in multiple generations of a single family, which tends to point to the involvement of genetic elements. An autosomal dominant transmission with varying expressivity has been proposed as a potential mechanism of transmission.

== Mechanism ==
Although the precise mechanism of congenital malalignment is unknown, a number of theories have been proposed, including lateral rotation of the nail matrix, an anomaly in the ligament that joins the matrix to the distal phalanx's periosteum, and environmental factors.

Increased tension in the extensor tendon of the hallux may play a major role in the pathogenesis of toenail malalignment. This tension pulls the lateral portion of the nail matrix proximally, which may cause a lateral rotation of the nail matrix and, as a result, a longitudinal displacement of the nail plate axis.

According to a recent theory, the etiology could be caused by a desynchronization in the growth of the distal phalanx of the hallux and the nail, which leads to bigger nail plates that have to extend laterally in order to fit into the underlying bony space.

It's also feasible that the dystrophy results from a combination of chronic neonatal trauma effects and genetically caused toenail malalignment. Extrinsic factors can include vascular anomalies during fetal life, higher intrauterine pressure, or constriction of the toes by amniotic bands.

== Diagnosis ==
The alignment of the great toenail and the digit itself should be assessed in patients with great toenail dystrophy. A diagnosis of classic malalignment of the nail plate is made by physically evaluating the misalignment of the nail unit in the context of a normally aligned digit.

In order to avoid mistakes and pointless therapies, a proper diagnosis is crucial. Onychomycosis, connective tissue diseases, tumors of the nail apparatus, and dermatoses involving the nails (such as psoriasis, lichen, and ectodermal dysplasia) are among the conditions included in the differential diagnosis.

== Treatment ==
Treatment is determined by the degree of deviation. A conservative and expectant attitude centered on prevention (e.g., wearing comfortable footwear) and treatment of complications is advised, as spontaneous realignment may occur up to 10 years of age.

Patients with a substantial deviation of the nail plate or early sequelae, such as recurring episodes of acute paronychia and/or infections, may be candidates for surgical therapy up to the age of two. The primary course of treatment involves rotating the entire nail unit to permit the nail plate to develop parallel to the distal phalanx.

Nail matrixectomy, which involves the total removal of the nail plate and matrix, effectively eliminates discomfort but may not be cosmetically appealing. It has also been proposed to surgically elongate the phalanx's extensor tendon.

== See also ==
- Skin lesion
- Congenital onychodysplasia of the index fingers
