= Ci protein =

Zinc finger containing transcription factor

Transcriptional activator cubitus interruptus

Identifiers
- Organism: Drosophila melanogaster (Fruit fly)
- Symbol: ci
- Alt. symbols: ci-D
- Entrez: 43767
- Orthologs: NCBI: entry; OMA: entry
- PDB: 3HQM
- RefSeq (mRNA): NM_079878
- RefSeq (Prot): NP_524617
- UniProt: P19538

Other data
- Chromosome: 4: 0.06 - 0.05 Mb
Search for
- Structures: Swiss-model
- Domains: InterPro

Ci protein, short for Cubitus interruptus, is a zinc finger containing transcription factor found in fruit flies. It is involved in the Hedgehog signaling pathway. In the absence of a signal to the Hedgehog signaling pathway, the Ci protein is cleaved and destroyed in proteasomes. It isn't, however, completely destroyed; part of the protein survives and acts as a repressor in the nucleus, keeping genes responsive to the Hedgehog signal silent.

Ci is part of the GLI-CH2H-zinc-finger family, and is homologous to human GLI proteins like GLI1, GLI2, and GLI3.

== Degradation of Ci ==
The degradation of Ci protein depends on a large multiprotein complex, which contains a serine/threonine kinase of unknown function, an anchoring protein that binds to microtubules (to keep the Ci protein out of the nucleus) and an adaptor protein. When the Hedgehog signaling pathway is turned on, the Ci proteolysis is suppressed and the unprocessed CI protein enters the nucleus, where it activates the transcription of its target genes. Ci undergoes complete or partial degradation in the cells, the detailed molecular mechanism is poorly understood. It has been reported that an AAA ATPase Ter94 complex and K11/K48 ubiquitin chains are involved in the selection of Ci degradation.

== Target genes ==
- The Wingless protein in Drosophila, which is crucial to the embryogenesis of the fruit fly, and acts through the Wnt signaling pathway.
- The Patched receptor protein of the Hedgehog signaling pathway, which production acts as a negative feedback, since the resulting increase in Patched protein on the cell surface inhibits the Hedgehog pathway.
