= David Middleton Greig =

Scottish surgeon

David Middleton Greig FRSE FRCSE LLD TD (1864 - 4 May 1936) was a Scottish surgeon who worked for most of his career at Dundee Royal Infirmary. He developed an interest in diseases of bone and came to be regarded as an international authority on the subject. He wrote numerous papers on skeletal abnormalities and Greig cephalopolysyndactyly syndrome (first described in 1926) is named after him. Over the course of his career he amassed a large collection of skulls demonstrating various bony abnormalities. After retiring from surgical practice he became conservator of the Museum of the Royal College of Surgeons of Edinburgh at Surgeons' Hall. He donated 250 skulls to Surgeons' Hall Museum, where some remain on display as part of the Greig Collection.

== Life ==
Greig was born at 140 Nethergate in Dundee in 1864, son of Dr David Greig a Dundee general practitioner and descendant of a long line of medical practitioners. He first studied medicine at the University of St Andrews but then moved to the University of Edinburgh where he graduated MB CM in 1885.

After a period working with his father as a GP in Dundee, he worked as a doctor at the Royal Asylum in Perth. From here he moved to the Baldovan Institute for Imbecile Children near Dundee. After three years serving as a military surgeon in India he returned to Scotland to take a post at Dundee Royal Infirmary (DRI). In 1899, at the onset of the Boer War he served under General Redvers Buller in Natal. He returned to Dundee in 1902 at the end of the war. He became a Fellow of the Royal College of Surgeons of Edinburgh and was appointed to the surgical staff of DRI and lecturer in surgery at the University of St Andrews.

From an early stage in his career he became an avid collector of pathological specimens and particularly of those relating to diseases and abnormalities of the skeleton. He became a regular contributor to the anatomical and surgical literature, many of his papers dealing with rare diseases and developmental abnormalities.

In 1911 he was living at 25 South Tay Street in Dundee, a three storey and basement Georgian terraced townhouse.

On retiring from surgical practice he became the full time Conservator of the Museum at the Royal College of Surgeons of Edinburgh, a post he held for 15 years. During this time he arranged for descriptions of every specimen in the collection, created a new museum catalogue based on a much improved indexing system. He also supervised the re-mounting a large proportion of the pathological specimens.

In 1925 he was elected a Fellow of the Royal Society of Edinburgh. His proposers were Anderson Gray McKendrick, James Hartley Ashworth, Arthur Robinson and Sir Harold Stiles.

He died in Edinburgh on 4 May 1936.

== Publications ==
- The Rhymes of Dundee Royal Infirmary (DRI) (an anthology of poems)
- A Case of Stab Wound to the Heart: Recovery
- Clinical Observations on the Surgical Pathology of Bone (1931).
