= Congenital onychodysplasia of the index fingers =

- Other names: Iso-Kikuchi syndrome
- Specialty: Dermatology

Congenital onychodysplasia of the index fingers is defined by the presence of the condition at birth, either unilateral or bilateral index finger involvement, variable distortion of the nail or lunula, and polyonychia, micronychia, anonychia, hemi-onychogryphosis, or malalignment.

This condition is also called Iso-Kikuchi syndrome, since Iso was the first author who published it in a Japanese paper.

== Signs and symptoms ==
Numerous nail anomalies are noted, such as uneven lunula, nail malalignment, hemionychogryphosis, polyonychia, micronychia, and anonychia.

== Causes ==
It is still unknown what exactly causes congenital onychodystrophy of the index finger. Nonetheless, there is evidence in favor of hereditary transmission.

== Diagnosis ==
Congenital onychodysplasia of the index fingers is diagnosed based on five criteria:

1. Congenital occurrence.
2. Bilateral or unilateral index finger involvement.
3. Variations in nail appearance.
4. Potential hereditary involvement.
5. Associated bone abnormalities.

== See also ==
- List of cutaneous conditions
