= Ulnar dimelia =

Rare congenital disorder

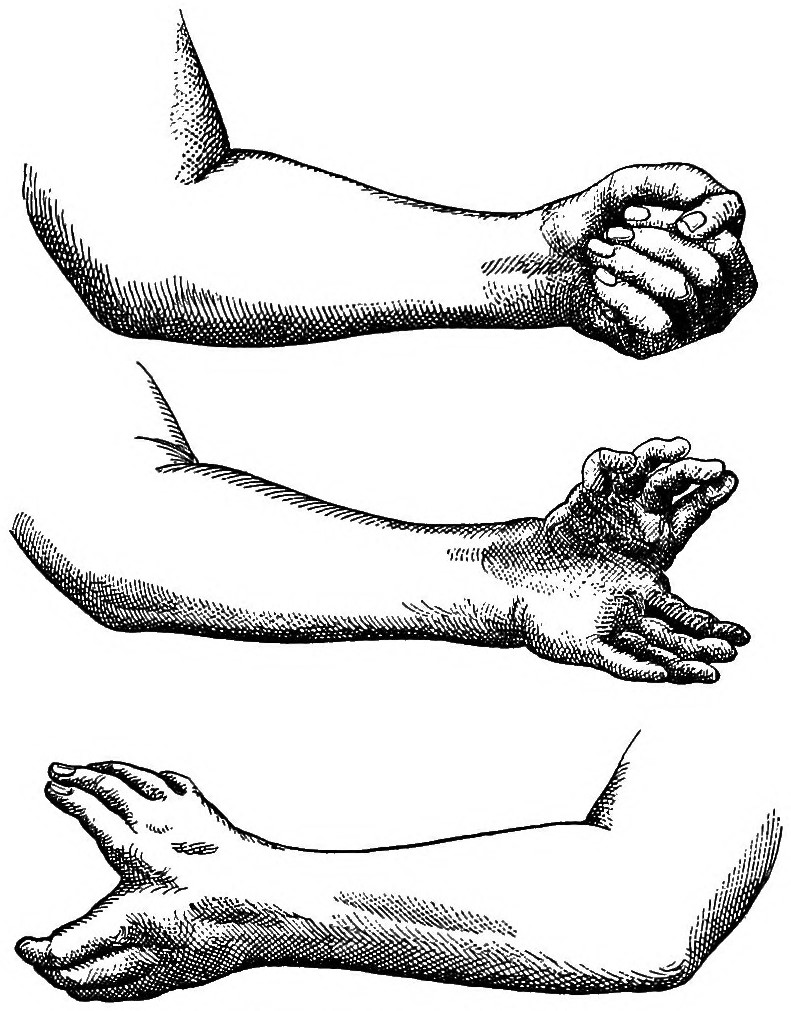
Ulnar dimelia, showing clenched position

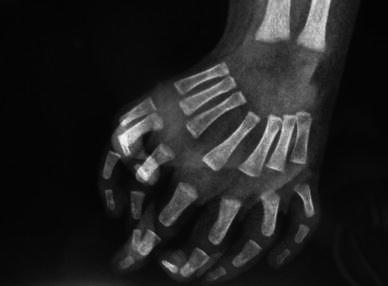
X-ray of 2-month-old female child with ulnar dimelia

Ulnar dimelia, also referred to simply as mirror hand, is a very rare congenital disorder characterized by the absence of the radial ray, duplication of the ulna, duplication of the carpal, metacarpal, and phalanx bones, and symmetric polydactyly. In some cases surgical amputation is performed to remove the duplicate carpals, metacarpals and phalanges. As of 2015, approximately 70 cases have been recorded in the medical literature.

The cause is thought to be an error during embryonic development and typically only one arm is affected.

Bone deformity may also accompany nervous and arterial anomalies in some cases due to the duplication of the ulnar nerve, the presence of abnormal arterial arches, the duplication of the ulnar artery, the shortening of the radial nerve, and the absence of the radial artery. The diagnosis of ulnar dimelia is based on laboratory tests of frontal and sagittal planes in individuals suspected of the condition. There are two types of ulnar dimelia noted in medical journals: Type 1 ulnar dimelia entails one lunate and one trapezoid bone as well as one index finger, while type 2 ulnar dimelia has two lunate and two trapezoid bones as well as two index fingers.

The American Society for Surgery of the Hand and the International Federation of Societies for Surgery of the Hand classified ulnar dimelia in the third group of congenital hand deformities in accordance with the characteristics proposed in the Swanson classification (1976).
