= Constructive development (biology) =

Biological hypothesis

In biology, constructive development refers to the hypothesis that organisms shape their own developmental trajectory by constantly responding to, and causing, changes in both their internal state and their external environment. Constructive development can be contrasted with programmed development, the hypothesis that organisms develop according to a genetic program or blueprint. The constructivist perspective is found in philosophy, most notably developmental systems theory, and in the biological and social sciences, including developmental psychobiology and key themes of the extended evolutionary synthesis. Constructive development may be important to evolution because it enables organisms to produce functional phenotypes in response to genetic or environmental perturbation, and thereby contributes to adaptation and diversification.

== Key themes of constructive development ==
=== Responsiveness and flexibility ===
At any point in time, an organism's development depends on both the current state of the organism and the state of the environment. The developmental system, including the genome and its epigenetic regulation, responds flexibly to internal and external inputs. One example is condition-dependent gene expression, but regulatory systems also rely on physical properties of cells and tissues and exploratory behavior among microtubular, neural, muscular and vascular systems.

=== Multiple modes of inheritance ===
Organisms inherit (i.e., receive from their predecessors) a diverse set of developmental resources, including DNA, epigenetic marks, organelles, enzymes, hormones, antibodies, transcription factors, symbionts, socially transmitted knowledge and environmental conditions modified by parents.

=== Developmental environments are constructed ===
In the course of development, organisms help shape their internal and external environment, and in this way, influence their own development. Organisms also construct developmental environments for their offspring through various forms of extra-genetic inheritance.

=== Distributed control ===
No single source of influence has central control over an organism's development. Whilst the genetic influence on development is fundamental, causation does not only occur from the bottom up, but also flows 'downwards' from more complex levels of organismal organization (e.g., tissue-specific regulation of gene expression). The result is that many features of organisms are emergent properties that are not encoded in the genome.

== Mechanisms of constructive development ==
Constructive development is manifest in context-dependent gene expression, physical properties of cells and tissues, exploratory behavior of physiological systems and learning.

=== Context-dependent gene expression ===
Although all the cells of an organism contain the same DNA, there can be hundreds of different types of cells in a single organism. These diverse cell shapes, behaviors and functions are created and maintained by tissue-specific gene expression patterns and these can be modified by internal and external environmental conditions.

=== Physical properties of cells and tissues ===
Assembly of organs, tissues, cells and subcellular components are in part determined by their physical properties. For example, the cell membrane that forms a barrier between the inside and outside of the cell is a lipid bilayer that forms as result of the thermodynamic properties of the phospholipids it's made of (hydrophilic head and hydrophobic tails).

=== Exploratory processes ===
Exploratory processes are selective processes that operate within individual organisms during their lifetimes. In many animals, the vascular, immune and nervous systems develop by producing a variety of forms, and the most functional solutions are selected for and retained, while others are lost. For example, the 'shape' of the circulatory system is constructed according to the oxygen and nutrient needs of tissues, rather than being genetically predetermined. Likewise, the nervous system develops through axonal exploration. Initially muscle fibers are connected to multiple neurons but synaptic competition selects certain connections over others to define the mature pattern of muscle innervation. The shape of a cell is determined by the structure of its cytoskeleton. A major element of the cytoskeleton are microtubules, which can grow in random directions from their origin. Microtubule-associated proteins can aid or inhibit microtubule growth, guide microtubules to specific cellular locations and mediate interactions with other proteins. Therefore, microtubules can be stabilized in new configurations that give rise to new cell shapes (and potentially new behaviors or functions) without changes to the microtubule system itself.

=== Learning ===
In animals, many behaviors are acquired through learning. Social learning and cultural transmission are important sources of adaptive phenotypic plasticity, enabling animals to adapt to their environments even if those environments have not frequently been encountered in the evolutionary history of the species. Social learning also enables stable inheritance of many characters. Cross-fostering of great tit and blue tit chicks show that social learning can result in stable inheritance of species-typical foraging behaviors (foraging height, prey type, prey size, foraging method) as well as nest site choice, alarm calls, songs, and mate choice. Recent killer whale research has demonstrated the divergence of orcas into several species mediated by learned and socially transmitted differences in diets.

== Constructive development and evolution ==
Within evolutionary biology, development has been traditionally viewed as under the direction of a genetic program (e.g.), and metaphors such as genetic 'blueprint', 'program' or 'instructions' are still widespread in biology textbooks. By contrast, the constructive development perspective views the genome as a sub-system of the cell shaped by evolution to detect and respond to the signals it receives. These different perspectives affect evolutionary interpretations. One example is the evolutionary significance of environmentally induced phenotypes. Mary Jane West-Eberhard famously suggested that responses to the environment can be the starting point for evolutionary change, termed 'plasticity-led evolution'. From a programmed development perspective, developmental plasticity is considered to be controlled by genetically specified switches or reaction norms. For these to produce functional responses to environmental change, their reaction norms must have been pre-screened by prior selection. Therefore, 'plasticity-led evolution' reduces to the standard evolutionary explanation of natural selection acting on genetic variation. Conversely, 'plasticity-led evolution' gains greater significance if development is constructive and open-ended. New functional phenotypes can emerge with little or no initial genetic modification (see facilitated variation), and provide the new raw material on which natural selection can act (e.g.).
