= Pallister–Hall syndrome =

Pallister–Hall syndrome (PHS)
- Pallister–Hall syndrome is inherited in an autosomal dominant pattern.
- Specialty: Medical genetics
- Frequency: 0.0001%
- Named after: Philip Pallister; Judith Goslin Hall

Pallister–Hall syndrome (PHS) is a rare genetic disorder that affects various body systems. The main features are a non-cancerous mass on the hypothalamus (hypothalamic hamartoma) and extra digits (polydactylism). The prevalence of Pallister-Hall Syndrome is unknown; about 100 cases have been reported in publication.

== History ==
The syndrome was originally described by American and Canadian geneticists Philip Pallister and Judith Hall in their research of newborn deaths due to pituitary failure. Subsequent discovery of living children and adults expanded the understanding of the syndrome and established the transmission pattern within families.

== Presentation ==
The main characteristics of the syndrome are extra fingers and/or toes (polydactyly), with the skin between some fingers or toes potentially fused or "webbed" (cutaneous syndactyly), and a benign mass or lesion in the brain called a hypothalamic hamartoma. This benign tumor may not cause any medical problems; however, some hypothalamic hamartomas lead to seizures or hormone abnormalities. Other features of Pallister–Hall syndrome include a split opening of the airway called bifid epiglottis, laryngeal cleft, blockage of the anal opening (imperforate anus), and kidney abnormalities. Signs and symptoms of this disorder vary from mild to severe.

=== Seizures ===
The most common type of seizure to occur from this disorder is known as gelastic epilepsy or "laughing" seizures. Seizures may begin at any age but usually before three or four years of age. The seizures usually start with laughter described as being "hollow" or "empty" and unpleasant. The laughter occurs suddenly for no obvious reason and is often out of place. Other traditional seizure types such as tonic-clonic and absence seizures may also develop due to temporal lobe epilepsy. People with Pallister-Hall may experience less severe seizures than people with a hypothalamic hamartoma only.

== Transmission ==
Pallister-Hall Syndrome occurs due to a mutation in the GLI3 gene that overrides normal genetic development. Before birth the GLI3 gene delivers directions for protein creation that turns on or off development of cells that produce organs and tissues. The abnormal GLI3 gene is shortened and can only turn off targeted genes.

Pallister-Hall Syndrome is transmitted in an autosomal dominant pattern. One copy of the altered gene in each cell is sufficient to cause the disorder. Thus, the child of one parent with PHS would have a 50% chance of inheriting the gene that causes the syndrome. Some cases can still result from new mutations in the gene and occur in people with no history of the disorder in their family.

== Diagnosis ==
Central characteristics of the disorder include polydactyly (extra digits on limbs) with possible cutaneous syndactyly (fusion or webbed skin between some fingers or toes) and a hypothalamic hamartoma, a rare brain lesion on the hypothalamus that is present at birth. While the mass may occur unrelatedly, the presence of polysyndactyly warrants investigation for PHS. Currently, clinical diagnosis is through a brain MRI and genetic sequencing for GLI 13 gene, which is known to cause Pallister-Hall Syndrome, as well as Greig cephalopolysyndactyly syndrome. Genetic testing can find and identify the corresponding disorder.

== Treatment ==
Treatment is limited to physical signs and symptoms of the hypothalamic hamartoma. Surgery may be required at birth to fix imperforate anus and address endocrine abnormalities. Selective removal of extra digits may occur in early childhood. Parents and medical practitioners should monitor for signs of endocrine disruption in sleep, eating, or hormonal issues, such as precocious puberty caused by the hypothalamic hamartoma.

Seizures may be treated with anticonvulsants. However, gelastic seizures are often intractable and may not benefit from such therapy. Resection of the hypothalamic hamartoma has improved seizure control and hypothalamic function in some patients.
