= GLI3 =

Protein-coding gene in the species Homo sapiens

Identifiers
- Aliases: GLI3, ACLS, GCPS, GLI3-190, GLI3FL, PAP-A, PAPA, PAPA1, PAPB, PHS, PPDIV, GLI family zinc finger 3
- External IDs: OMIM: 165240; MGI: 95729; GeneCards: GLI3
Available structures
PDB	Ortholog search: PDBe RCSB
PDB	List of PDB id codes 4BLD

Gene location (Human)
Chr.	Chromosome 7 (human)
Band	7p14.1	Start	41,960,949 bp
Band	7p14.1	End	42,264,100 bp

Gene location (Mouse)
Chr.	Chromosome 13 (mouse)
Band	13 A1|13 5.43 cM	Start	15,637,820 bp
Band	13 A1|13 5.43 cM	End	15,904,611 bp
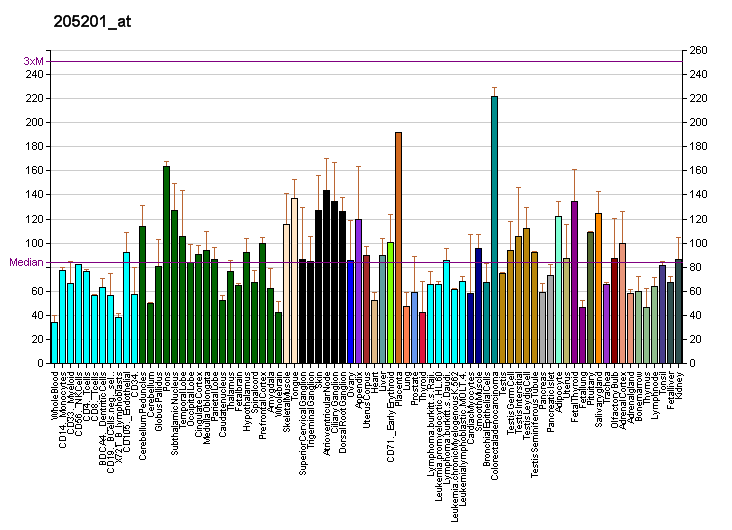
RNA expression pattern
Bgee	Human / Mouse (ortholog); Top expressed in: ventricular zone; olfactory bulb; tendon of biceps brachii; tibia; ganglionic eminence; parietal pleura; nipple; triceps brachii muscle; glutes; buccal mucosa cell / Top expressed in: maxillary prominence; genital tubercle; spermatogonium; mandibular prominence; tail of embryo; ureter; ventricular zone; abdominal wall; primitive streak; hair follicle; More reference expression data
BioGPS	More reference expression data
Gene ontology
Molecular function	DNA-binding transcription factor activity; DNA-binding transcription activator activity, RNA polymerase II-specific; histone deacetylase binding; RNA polymerase II transcription regulatory region sequence-specific DNA binding; metal ion binding; RNA polymerase II cis-regulatory region sequence-specific DNA binding; beta-catenin binding; chromatin binding; protein binding; histone acetyltransferase binding; nucleic acid binding; DNA binding; sequence-specific DNA binding; DNA-binding transcription factor activity, RNA polymerase II-specific; mediator complex binding
Cellular component	cytoplasm; cytosol; transcription repressor complex; nucleus; nuclear speck; cell projection; mediator complex; cilium; axoneme; nucleoplasm; ciliary base; ciliary tip
Biological process	embryonic skeletal system morphogenesis; pattern specification process; lateral semicircular canal development; negative regulation of neuron differentiation; T cell differentiation in thymus; tongue development; nose morphogenesis; optic nerve morphogenesis; smoothened signaling pathway involved in ventral spinal cord interneuron specification; anatomical structure formation involved in morphogenesis; oligodendrocyte differentiation; hindgut morphogenesis; spinal cord dorsal/ventral patterning; thymocyte apoptotic process; mammary gland development; limb development; odontogenesis of dentin-containing tooth; positive regulation of chondrocyte differentiation; embryonic digestive tract morphogenesis; inner ear development; metanephros development; melanocyte differentiation; negative regulation of canonical Wnt signaling pathway; negative regulation of cell population proliferation; regulation of apoptotic process; positive regulation of neuroblast proliferation; regulation of transcription, DNA-templated; limb morphogenesis; negative regulation of smoothened signaling pathway; kidney development; lung development; tube development; embryonic organ development; lateral ganglionic eminence cell proliferation; negative regulation of cell differentiation; embryonic digit morphogenesis; negative regulation of alpha-beta T cell differentiation; in utero embryonic development; transcription, DNA-templated; negative thymic T cell selection; positive regulation of transcription, DNA-templated; development of the heart; central nervous system development; telencephalon development; branching involved in ureteric bud morphogenesis; embryonic limb morphogenesis; neural tube development; positive regulation of protein import into nucleus; smoothened signaling pathway; camera-type eye development; spinal cord motor neuron differentiation; positive regulation of alpha-beta T cell differentiation; lambdoid suture morphogenesis; regulation of bone development; roof of mouth development; proximal/distal pattern formation; anatomical structure development; wound healing; negative regulation of apoptotic process; negative regulation of transcription by RNA polymerase II; response to estrogen; cerebral cortex radial glia-guided migration; positive regulation of osteoblast differentiation; developmental growth; pallium development; mammary gland specification; frontal suture morphogenesis; anterior semicircular canal development; regulation of gene expression; negative regulation of transcription, DNA-templated; dorsal/ventral pattern formation; branching morphogenesis of an epithelial tube; embryonic digestive tract development; subpallium development; sagittal suture morphogenesis; forebrain dorsal/ventral pattern formation; protein processing; axon guidance; brain development; smoothened signaling pathway involved in dorsal/ventral neural tube patterning; forebrain radial glial cell differentiation; regulation of cell population proliferation; smoothened signaling pathway involved in spinal cord motor neuron cell fate specification; layer formation in cerebral cortex; embryonic morphogenesis; artery development; cell differentiation involved in kidney development; regulation of cell differentiation; forebrain development; neuron fate commitment; hippocampus development; camera-type eye morphogenesis; anterior/posterior pattern specification; positive regulation of transcription by RNA polymerase II; transcription by RNA polymerase II; prostate gland development; liver regeneration
Sources:Amigo / QuickGO
Orthologs
Databases	NCBI: entry; OMA: entry
Species	Human	Mouse
Entrez	2737	14634
Ensembl	ENSG00000106571	ENSMUSG00000021318
UniProt	P10071	Q61602
RefSeq (mRNA)	NM_000168	NM_008130
RefSeq (protein)	NP_000159	NP_032156
Location (UCSC)	Chr 7: 41.96 – 42.26 Mb	Chr 13: 15.64 – 15.9 Mb
PubMed search
- Wikidata
View/Edit Human	View/Edit Mouse

Zinc finger protein GLI3 is a protein that in humans is encoded by the GLI3 gene.

This gene encodes a protein that belongs to the C2H2-type zinc finger proteins subclass of the Gli family. They are characterized as DNA-binding transcription factors and are mediators of Sonic hedgehog (Shh) signaling. The protein encoded by this gene localizes in the cytoplasm and activates patched Drosophila homolog (PTCH1) gene expression. It is also thought to play a role during embryogenesis.

== Role in development ==
Gli3 is a known transcriptional repressor but may also have a positive transcriptional function. Gli3 represses dHand and Gremlin, which are involved in developing digits. There is evidence that Shh-controlled processing (e.g., cleavage) regulates transcriptional activity of Gli3 similarly to that of Ci. Gli3 mutant mice have many abnormalities including CNS and lung defects and limb polydactyly. In the developing mouse limb bud, Gli3 derepression predominantly regulates Shh target genes.

== Disease association ==
Mutations in this gene have been associated with several diseases, including Greig cephalopolysyndactyly syndrome, Pallister–Hall syndrome, preaxial polydactyly type IV, and postaxial polydactyly types A1 and B. DNA copy-number alterations that contribute to increased conversion of the oncogenes Gli1–3 into transcriptional activators by the Hedgehog signaling pathway are included in a genome-wide pattern, which was found to be correlated with an astrocytoma patient's outcome.

There is evidence that the autosomal dominant disorder Greig cephalopolysyndactyly syndrome (GCPS) that affects limb and craniofacial development in humans is caused by a translocations within the GLI3 gene.

== Interactions with Gli1 and Gli2 ==
The independent overexpression Gli1 and Gli2 in mice models to lead to formation of basal cell carcinoma (BCC). Gli1 knockout is shown to lead to similar embryonic malformations as Gli1 overexpressions but not the formation of BCCs. Overexpression of Gli3 in transgenic mice and frogs does not lead to the development of BCC-like tumors and is not thought to play a role in tumor BCC formation.

Gli1 and Gli2 overexpression leads to BCC formation in mouse models and a one step model for tumour formation has been suggested in both cases. This also indicates that Gli1 and/or Gli2 overexpression is vital in BCC formation. Co-overexpression of Gli1 with Gli2 and Gli2 with Gli3 leads to transgenic mice malformations and death, respectively, but not the formation of BCC. This suggests that overexpression of more than one Gli protein is not necessary for BCC formation.

== Interactions ==
GLI3 has been shown to interact with CREBBP SUFU, ZIC1, and ZIC2.
