= Polydactyly =

Physical anomaly involving extra fingers or toes

- Other names: Hyperdactyly; polydactylism; supernumerary digits
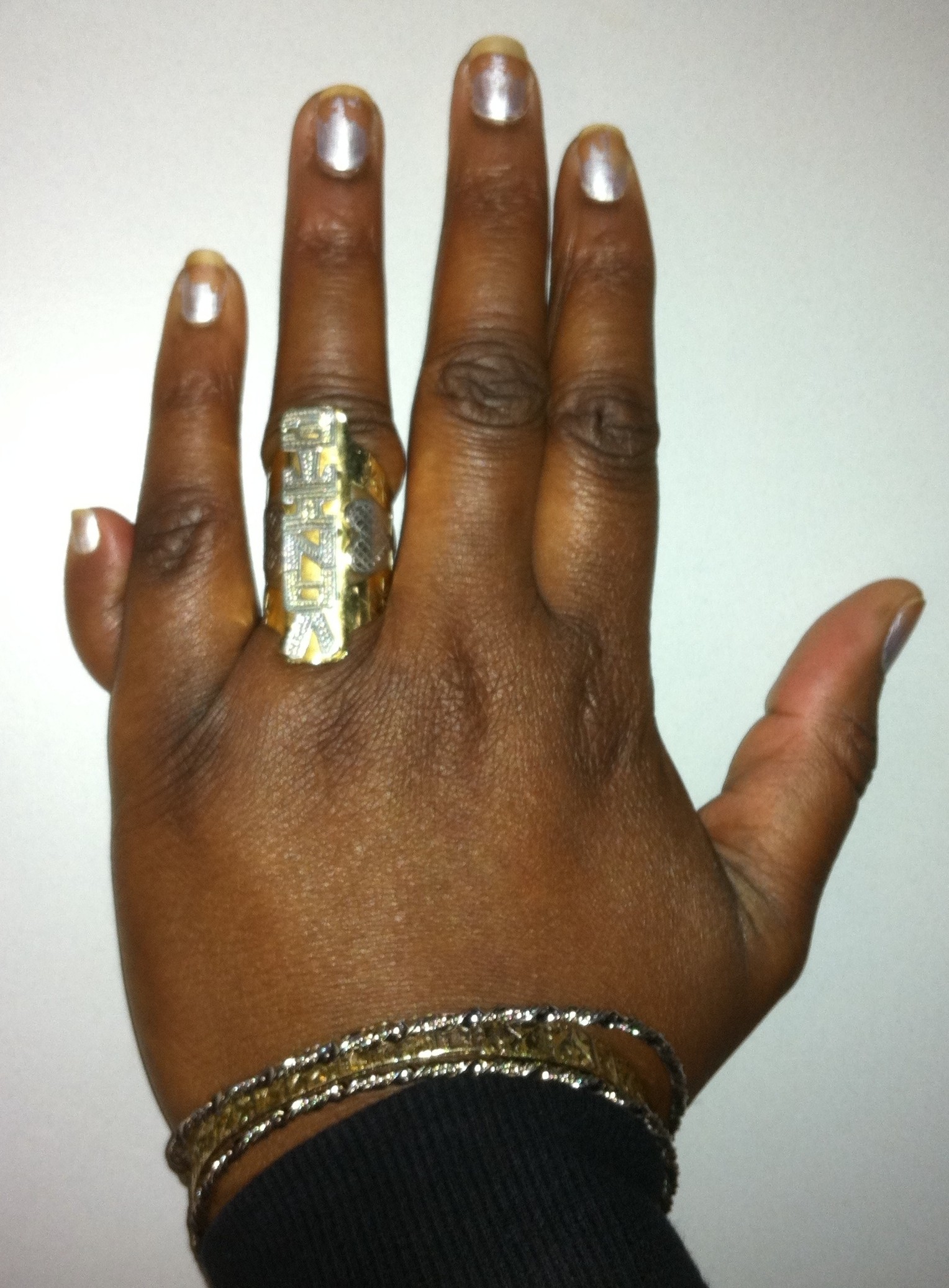
- A left hand with postaxial extra finger
- Specialty: Medical genetics
- Symptoms: Extra fingers or toes
- Complications: Pain, low self-esteem, clumsiness
- Usual onset: Early development
- Types: Syndromic; Non-syndromic: Pre-axial, axial or central, postaxial
- Treatment: Surgery
- Frequency: 4 to 12 per 10,000

Polydactyly (commonly known as sixth finger and extra finger) is a birth defect that results in extra fingers or toes. The hands are more commonly involved than the feet. Extra fingers may be painful, affect self-esteem, or result in clumsiness.

Polydactyly is associated with at least 39 genetic mutations. It may either present alone or with other defects. Cases may run in families. The underlying mechanism involves an error in limb bud formation during early development. Diagnosis may occur before birth via prenatal ultrasound as early as nine weeks. X-rays may be useful after a child is a year old. The opposite is oligodactyly (fewer fingers or toes).

Treatment varies from removal by cautery to more involved surgery. While putting a tight band around the base has been carried out, this is not typically recommended. If surgery is required, this is often done around two years of age. Occasionally multiple surgeries are required.

Polydactyly is present in about 4 to 12 per 10,000 newborns. It is the most common defect of the hands and feet. In the United States, Black people are more commonly affected than white people. The term is from Greek πολύς (polys) 'many' and δάκτυλος (daktylos) 'finger'.

== Signs and symptoms ==
In humans/animals this condition can present itself on one or both hands or feet. The extra digit is usually a small piece of soft tissue that can be removed. Occasionally it contains bone without joints; rarely it may be a complete functioning digit. The extra digit is most common on the ulnar (little finger) side of the hand, less common on the radial (thumb) side, and very rarely within the middle three digits. These are respectively known as postaxial (little finger), preaxial (thumb), and central (ring, middle, index fingers) polydactyly. The extra digit is most commonly an abnormal fork in an existing digit, or it may rarely originate at the wrist as a normal digit does. Polydactyly can be divided into three major types, which are discussed below, which depend on the location of the additional digit.

In 2019 it was found that in cases of polydactyly with a fully functional additional digit, muscles to control the extra digit may be duplicated, resulting in increased motor control that allows the patient to carry out certain tasks with one hand that would normally require two.

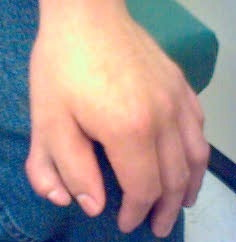
Example of unilateral preaxial polydactyly affecting the left thumb. The supernumerary digit had normal sensation but no joint and hence could not move independently.

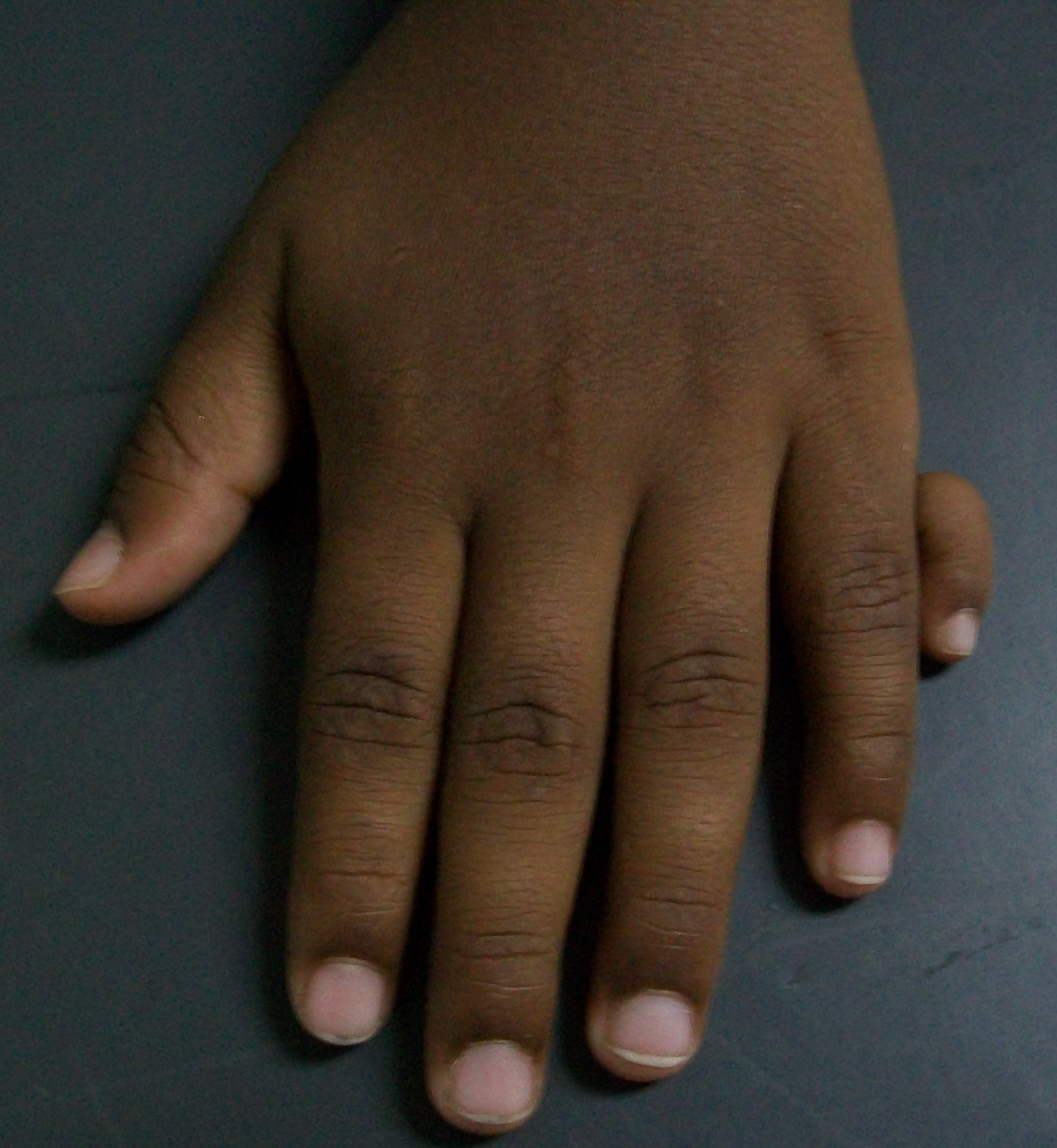
Type 1 ulnar polydactyly. An extra digit is attached by skin and nerves.

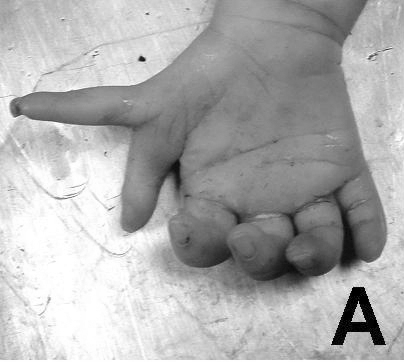
Preaxial polydactyly

=== Ulnar or postaxial ===
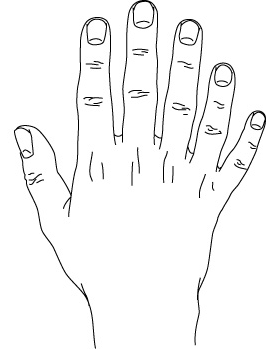
Postaxial polydactyly

This is the most common situation, in which the extra digit is on the ulnar side of the hand, thus the side of the little finger. This can also be called postaxial polydactyly. It can manifest itself very subtly, for instance only as a nubbin on the ulnar side of the little finger, or very distinctly, as a fully developed finger. Most commonly, the extra finger is rudimentary, consisting of an end phalanx with a nail, and connected to the hand with a small skin pedicle. Mostly one neurovascular bundle can be identified, with no tendons present in the extra digit. In case of a fully developed extra finger, the duplication usually presents itself at the level of the metacarpophalangeal joint. A triplication of the little finger is very rare. Ulnar polydactyly occurs ten times more often in African populations. The incidence in Caucasians is reported as 1 in 1,339 live births, compared with 1 in 143 live births in Africans. Ulnar polydactyly is also often part of a syndrome. In patients with African ancestry ulnar polydactyly mostly occurs isolated, whereas the presentation in Caucasians is often associated with a syndrome, though in a retrospective review, only 4 of 37 cases of ulnar polydactyly in Caucasians were syndromic.

=== Radial or preaxial ===
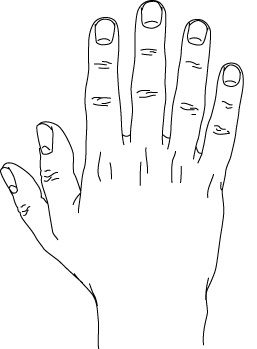
Preaxial polydactyly

This is a less common situation, in which the affectation is on the side of the hand towards the thumb. Radial polydactyly refers to the presence of an extra digit (or extra digits) on the radial side of the hand. It is most frequent in Indian populations and it is the second most common congenital hand disorder. The incidence of radial polydactyly is reported as 1 in every 3,000 live births. The clinical features of radial polydactyly will depend upon the extent of duplication. Radial polydactyly varies from a barely visible radial skin tag to complete duplication. Thumb polydactyly varies from barely visible broadening of the distal phalanx to full duplication of the thumb including the first metacarpal. Radial polydactyly is frequently associated with several syndromes.

=== Central ===
This is a rare condition, in which the extra digit is on the ring, middle or index finger. Of these fingers, the index finger is most often affected, whereas the ring finger is rarely affected. This type of polydactyly can be associated with syndactyly, cleft hand, and several other syndromes. Polysyndactyly presents various degrees of syndactyly affecting fingers three and four.

== Causes ==
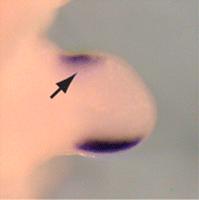
Preaxial polydactyly: Ectopic SHH-expression, Hemingway mutant, mouse, right forelimb

Polydactyly is associated with different mutations, either mutations in a gene itself or in a cis-regulatory element responsible for the expression of a specific gene. Mutations in Hoxa- or Hoxd clusters are reported leading to polydactyly. Interactions of Hoxd13 and GLI3 induce synpolydactyly, a combination of extra and consolidated digits. Other signal transduction pathways in this context are the Wnt signaling pathway or Notch.

In the specific case of preaxial polydactyly (Hemingway mutant), a cis-acting mutation approximately 1Mb upstream of SHH gene has been implicated. Normally SHH is expressed in an organiser region, called the zone of polarizing activity (ZPA) on the posterior limb side. From there it diffuses anteriorly, laterally to the growth direction of the limb. In the mutant, smaller ectopic expression in a new organiser region is seen on the anterior side of the limb. This ectopic expression causes cell proliferation delivering the raw material for one or more new digits.

Polydactyly can occur by itself, or more commonly, as one feature of a syndrome of congenital anomalies. When it occurs by itself, it is associated with autosomal dominant mutations in single genes, i.e. it is not a multifactorial trait. But mutation in a variety of genes can give rise to polydactyly. Typically the mutated gene is involved in developmental patterning, and a syndrome of congenital anomalies results, of which polydactyly is one feature or two.

Polydactyly has been linked to the prenatal environment in a 2020 study showing a relationship to maternal PM10 pollution exposure in China.

Types include:

| OMIM | Type | Locus |
|---|---|---|
| 174200 | Postaxial A1 | GLI3 at 7p13 |
| 602085 | Postaxial A2 | 13q21-q32 |
| 607324 | Postaxial A3 | 19p13.2-p13.1 |
| 608562 | Postaxial A4 | 7q22 |
| 174400 | Preaxial I | ? |
| 174500 | Preaxial II | SHH at 7q36 |
| 174600 | Preaxial III | ? |
| 174700 | Preaxial IV | GLI3 at 7p13 |

=== Syndromes ===
Because polydactyly can be part of a syndrome (known genetic defect) or association (genetic defect not known), children with a congenital upper extremity deformity should be examined by a geneticist for other congenital anomalies. This should also be done if a syndrome is suspected, or if more than two or three generations of the family are affected.

As of 2009, 97 genetic syndromes have been associated with different kinds of polydactyly.

Examples of syndromes include Diamond–Blackfan anemia, and the VACTERL association, acrocallosal syndrome, basal cell nevus syndrome, Biemond syndrome, ectrodactyly-ectodermal dysplasias-cleft lip/palate syndrome, mirror hand deformity, Mohr syndrome, oral-facial-digital syndrome, Rubinstein–Taybi syndrome, short rib polydactyly.

=== Ulnar ===
Ulnar polydactyly is often bilateral and associated with syndactyly and polydactyly of the feet. This can be a simple or complex polydactyly. Ulnar polydactyly occurs as an isolated congenital condition, but can also be part of a syndrome, such as: trisomy 13, Greig cephalopolysyndactyly syndrome, Meckel syndrome, Ellis–van Creveld syndrome, McKusick–Kaufman syndrome, Down syndrome, Bardet–Biedl syndrome, Smith–Lemli–Opitz syndrome.

=== Radial ===
Type VII of radial polydactyly is associated with several syndromes: Holt–Oram syndrome, Fanconi anemia (aplastic anemia by the age of 6), Townes–Brocks syndrome, and Greig cephalopolysyndactyly (also known to occur with ulnar polydactyly).

=== Central ===
The syndromes associated with central polydactyly are: Bardet–Biedl syndrome, Meckel syndrome, Pallister–Hall syndrome, Legius syndrome, Holt–Oram syndrome. Central polydactyly can also be associated with syndactyly and cleft hand.

=== Evolution ===
From an evo-devo point of view, polydactyly is a phenotypic variation or innovation, as the fingers and toes arise in places where nothing is phenotypically present in the wild type. Although it is initiated by a point mutation, it occurs as a polyphenism with different numbers of toes. The analysis of the additional toe numbers of Maine Coon cats revealed that the number of toes follows a developmental bias: 2 additional toes occur much more frequently than 4, these more frequently than 6 or 8 additional ones. Also, for the evo-devo theory, polydactyly cannot be adequately explained by genetic mutation alone, but only by constructive development, i.e. the ability of development to produce a complex phenotypic output. The corresponding symbolic generation of toes can now be shown in computer models.

== Diagnosis ==
Classification is performed by using x-ray imaging to see the bone structures. In 1961, Frantz and O'Rahilly proposed that congenital anomalies of the limb could be classified in seven categories, based on the embryonic failure causing the clinical presentation. These categories are failure of formation of parts, failure of differentiation, duplication, overgrowth, undergrowth, congenital constriction band syndrome, and generalized skeletal abnormalities. In 1976 this was modified by Swanson. Polydactyly belongs to the category of duplication. As of 2009, research has shown that the majority of congenital anomalies occur during the 4-week embryologic period of rapid limb development.

=== Ulnar ===
The classification of ulnar polydactyly exists of either two or three types. The two-stage classification, according to Temtamy and McKusick, involves type A and B. In type A there is an extra little finger at the metacarpophalangeal joint, or more proximal including the carpometacarpal joint. The little finger can be hypoplastic or fully developed. Type B varies from a nubbin to an extra, non-functional little finger part on a pedicle. According to the three-type classification, type I includes nubbins or floating little fingers, type II includes duplications at the MCPJ, and type III includes duplications of the entire ray.

=== Radial ===
The Wassel classification is the most widely used classification of radial polydactyly, based upon the most proximal level of skeletal duplication. The most common type is Wassel 4 (about 50% of such duplications) followed by Wassel 2 (20%) and Wassel 6 (12%).

=== Central ===
The classification of central polydactyly is based on the extent of duplication and involves the following three types: Type I is a central duplication, not attached to the adjacent finger by osseous or ligamentous attachments; it frequently does not include bones, joints, cartilage, or tendons. Type IIA is a nonsyndactylous duplication of a digit or part of a digit with normal components, and articulates with a broad or bifid metacarpal or phalanx. Type IIB is a syndactylous duplication of a digit or part of a digit with normal components, and articulates with a broad or bifid metacarpal or phalanx. Type III is a complete digital duplication, which has a well-formed duplicated metacarpal.

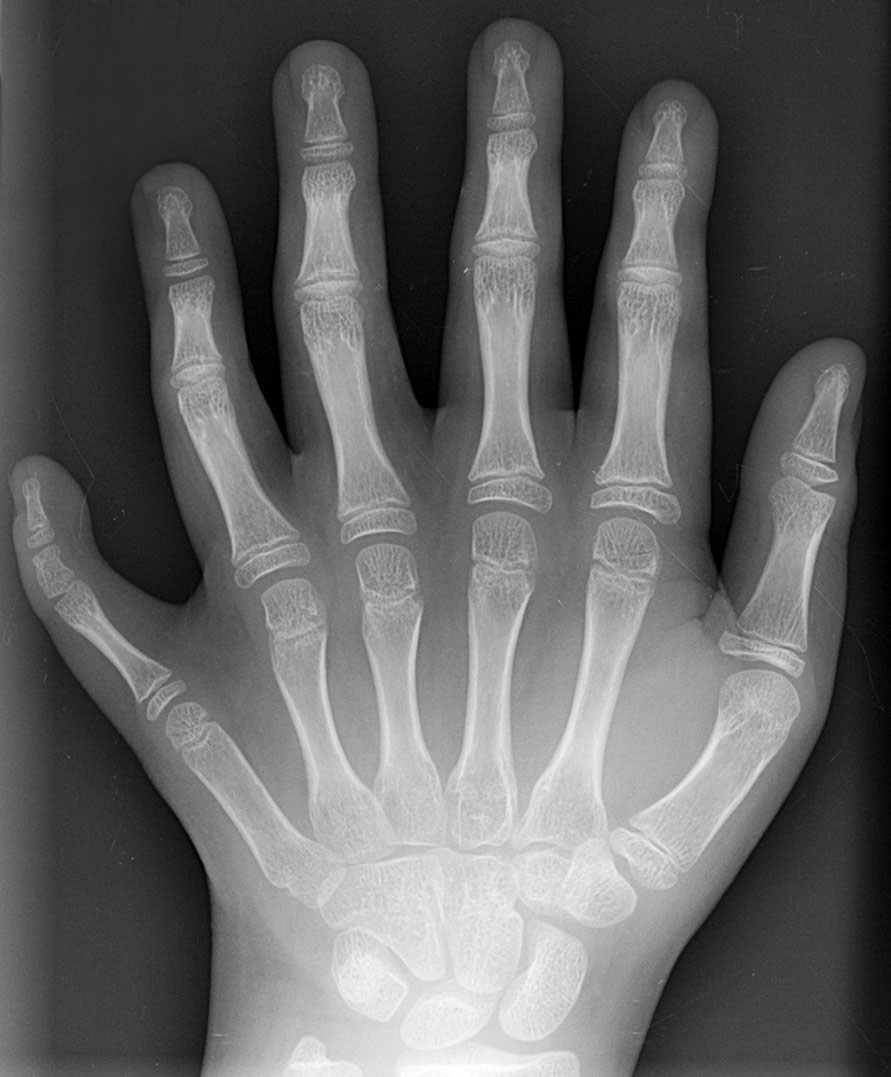
X-ray of type III central polydactyly. The middle fingers are the same length.

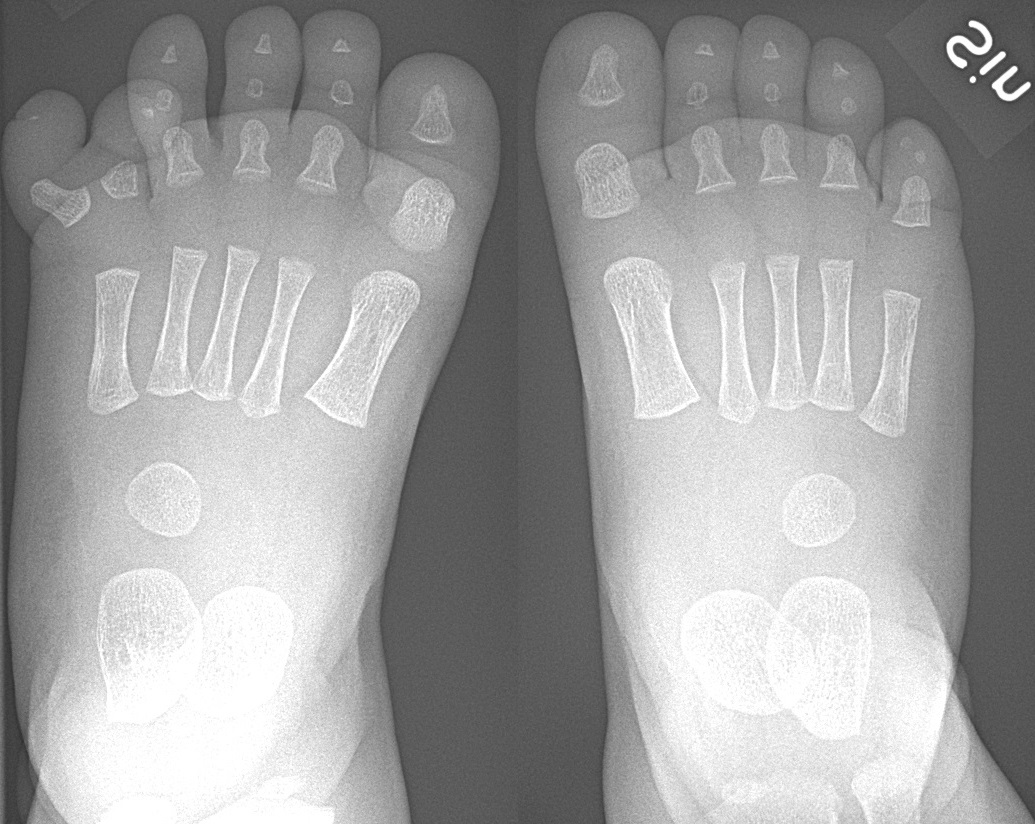
Right-sided duplication of the right little toe in an 8.5 months old male, with two toes (fifth and sixth) apparently forming joints with the fifth metatarsal bone, which is mildly broadened distally. The duplicated toes have almost normal growth. The fifth toe has mild varus angulation, and the sixth toe has substantial valgus angulation.

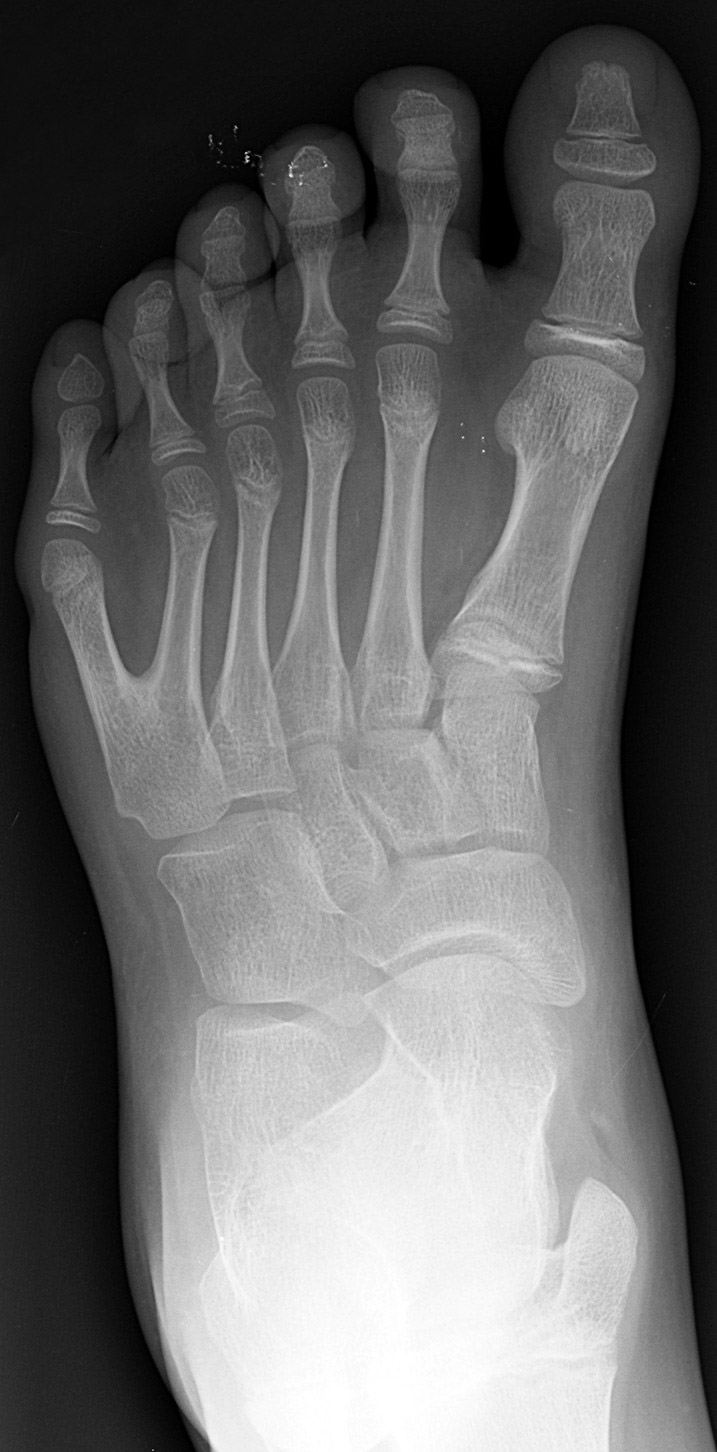
Left foot with postaxial polydactyly of 5th ray

== Treatment ==
=== Ulnar ===
Ulnar polydactyly usually does not interfere with hand function, but for social reasons it can be treated operatively.

==== Type A ====
The treatment of Type A ulnar polydactyly is complex as its goal is to remove the accessory digit while maintaining a stable, functional small finger. When the duplicated proximal phalanx articulates with a common, broad metacarpal head, the ulnar collateral ligament must be considered. In those cases with a common articulation or with a sixth metacarpal the muscle executing the abduction of the little finger (abductor digiti minimi) must be preserved. In patients with a common metacarpal articulation an elliptical incision at the base of the post-axial digit is made. This incision may be extended proximally in order to adequately expose the abductor digiti minimi. The ulnar collateral ligament and the insertions of the abductor digiti minimi are then elevated with a periosteal sleeve. The duplicated extensor and flexor tendons to the ulnar digit are transected and after that the digit is amputated at its articulation with the metacarpal. If the articular surface is wide the metacarpal may be shaved. At last the collateral ligament and abductor digiti minimi are reinserted at the base of the preserved proximal phalanx and a wire is then placed across the reconstructed joint. In patients with a duplicated metacarpal, the accessory digit is amputated in a standard ray fashion with transfer of the abductor digiti minimi to the retained small finger.

==== Type B ulnar ====
In this situation there is an absence of osseous and ligamentous structures. The surgical technique is analogous to radial polydactyly, in which the level of duplication and anatomical components should guide operative treatment. The pedicled ulnar extra digit can be removed by suture ligation to devise the skin bridge of the newborn child. This might be easier than an excision of the extra digit when the child is 6 to 12 months old. Ligation occludes the vascular supply to the duplicated digit, resulting in dry gangrene and subsequent autoamputation. This must be done with consideration of the presence of a neurovascular bundle, even in very small skin bridges. When the ligation is done inappropriately it can give a residual nubbin. Also, a neuroma can develop in the area of the scar. An excision can prevent the development of a residual nubbin and the sensitivity due to a neuroma.

For infants with ulnar type B polydactyly the recommended treatment is ligation in the neonatal nursery. A 2011 study opined that excision of an extra digit in the neonatal nursery was a safe and simple procedure with a good clinical and cosmetic outcome.

As of 2022, for infants with ulnar type B polydactyly the recommended treatment is surgical excision or suture ligation, when no bony structures exist. Complications of ligation include infection, neuroma or cyst formation.

=== Radial ===
Because neither of the two thumb components is normal, a decision should be taken on combining which elements to create the best possible composite digit. Instead of amputating the most hypoplastic thumb, preservation of skin, nail, collateral ligaments and tendons is needed to augment the residual thumb. Surgery is recommended in the first year of life, generally between 9 and 15 months of age. Surgical options depend on type of polydactyly.

==== Bilhaut-Cloquet procedure ====
This type of procedure is recommended for Wassel types 1 and 2 (in which both thumbs are severely hypoplastic) by some congenital hand surgeons. The technique contains a composite wedge resection of the central bone and soft-tissue. This will be achieved with approach of the lateral tissue of each thumb. The goal is to achieve a normal thumb, what concerns the size, which is possible. If the width of the nail bed is greater than 70% of the contralateral thumb, it may be split.

==== Ablation with collateral ligament reconstruction ====
This type of procedure is used for all Wassel types of polydactyly and is the most commonly used technique. It is recommended in all cases of thumb duplication with a hypoplastic, less-functional thumb. Otherwise, one could consider the Bilhaut-Cloquet. The ulnar thumb is preferably preserved as it is the more developed one in most cases.

By detaching the radial collateral ligament from distal to proximal, a periosteal sleeve can be preserved. In this way, the radial collateral band of the radial digit will function as the absent radial collateral ligament of the preserved ulnar thumb.

Elevation of the APB and FPB is performed in Wassel type 4 duplication; this can be accomplished via the periosteum or separately. As the tendons insert proximally, the elevation is performed proximally too to potentially rebalance the ulnar thumb. After the radial thumb is amputated, the ulnar elements are centralized and fixed with a Kirschner wire. In most cases, a longitudinal and sagittal osteotomy is needed to centralize the bony parts of the ulnar thumb. While the soft-tissue of the radial thumb was preserved, it is now attached to the radial side of the ulnar thumb together with the periosteal sleeve. The APB and FPB of the ablated radial thumb are attached to the distal phalanx for more stability. If necessary, the extensor pollicis longus and the flexor pollicis longus are reattached to centralize their course.

In Wassel type 5 and 6 the opponens pollicis muscle must be transferred to the ulnar metacarpal. Soft tissue with collateral ligament reconstruction is used to avoid any angular deformity in the preserved thumb. Tendon centralization is also often used for correction. Still, cases with osseous deformities may happen. To provide alignment, osteotomies are necessary to be done. This operation may need bone grafting, which is obtained from the amputated thumb.

==== On top plasty procedure ====
This type is indicated when one thumb is larger proximally and the other thumb has a larger distal component. (The procedure is initially described as a way to lengthen amputated digits.) The goal is to create a functional thumb by combining less-hypoplastic components. On top plasty procedure is rarely employed in the treatment of congenital thumb duplication. It might be necessary for Wassel types 4, 5, 6.

At the level of the mid-proximal phalanx or mid-metacarpal, the distal component is transferred to the proximal component. The tendons of the distal component are preserved as the rest of the distal component is amputated. The neurovascular bundle which supplies the distal component is reserved and transferred proximally.

=== Central ===
Early osteotomy and ligament reconstructions should be done to prevent deformities, such as angular growth deformities.

The surgical treatment of central polydactyly is highly variable. After the surgery the hand must be functional and stable, but also aesthetically pleasing. This requires intraoperative creativity and flexibility. The surgeon must also consider whether retention of a fully functional supranumerary digit is preferable to surgical intervention. In contrast, a functional, four-fingered hand achieved via ray amputation may be preferable to a five-fingered hand with a deformed or stiff reconstructed finger.

Cases of polysyndactyly are approached through a standard opposing zig-zag incision. The incision is favored toward the accessory digit, preserving extra skin for subsequent closure. Depending on the level and extent of duplication, the flexor and extensor tendons may require centralization or rebalancing. Also, the collateral ligaments must be preserved or reconstructed. Wide articular surfaces should be narrowed and phalangeal wedge osteotomies may be required to provide an axial alignment. Attention must also be given to reconstruct the intermetacarpal ligament. Furthermore, one should take in mind the provision for adequate web-space soft tissue.

=== Complications ===
Complications include: painful scarring, infection, joint instability, residual deformity, angulated growth, growth arrest, joint stiffness, and nail bed deformities. A 2014 study reported a 19% revision rate for preaxial polydactyly for pain or instability.

== Prognosis ==
=== Ulnar ===
==== Type A ====
There are no substantive outcome studies regarding the function of these hands following surgical intervention. This is mainly caused by the fact that there is a generally normal function of these patients' hands following ablation with collateral ligament reconstruction. In a study on 27 patients undergoing surgical excision for Type A ulnar polydactyly, only one complication was noted in the form of an infection. However, no investigators have objectively reviewed functional range of motion or articular stability.

==== Type B ====
In a study on 21 patients with Type B ulnar polydactyly treated with suture ligation it was found that the duplicated digit was typically amputated at an average of 10 days and no complications of infection or bleeding were reported. In a large study on 105 patients treated with suture ligation an overall complication rate of 23.5% was reported, citing a residual tender or unacceptable bump in 16%, infection in 6%, and bleeding in 1% of patients. In general, suture ligation is safe and effective when applied to appropriate cases of Type B polydactyly in which no substantial ligamentous or osseous structures are present within the pedicle. Parents should be educated as to the progression of necrosis, and that revision of residual tissue or scar may be necessary when the child is six months of age or older.

=== Radial ===
==== Bilhaut procedure ====
Advantages: By combining two hypoplastic thumbs a sufficient thumb size is acquired. Furthermore, the IP and MCP joints are very stable as the collateral ligaments are not violated during reconstruction. Disadvantages: Violation during reconstruction can lead to growth arrest or asymmetric growth. Nail deformity could also occur after reconstruction. Although the joints are stable, restriction of flexion may be possible. The average IP flexion in a reconstructed thumb is 55 degrees less than the contralateral thumb. MCP flexion averaged 55 degrees in reconstructed thumbs, compared to 75 degrees in the contralateral thumb.

==== Ablation with collateral ligament reconstruction ====
Advantages: The reconstructed joints tend to remain flexible. Also, it preserves the nail bed and physis, this increases the prevention of nail deformities over time. Disadvantages: Although surgeons try to obtain a stable thumb of appropriate size, instability of the IP and MCP joint may occur, as well as a size mismatch. Thumbs are defined as unacceptable if IP joint deviation exceeds 15 degrees, MCP joint deviation exceeds 30 degrees, and thumb size is inappropriate based on the examiner's assessment. Also, thumb size one-third greater or less than the contralateral thumb is defined as unacceptable.

==== On-top plasty procedure ====
No surgical outcomes studies exist for evaluating the function of the thumbs after an on-top plasty reconstruction.

=== Central ===
Few clinical outcome studies exist regarding the treatment of central polydactyly. Tada and colleagues note that satisfactory surgical correction of central polydactyly is difficult to achieve and that outcomes are generally poor. In Tada's study, 12 patients were reviewed. All patients required secondary surgical procedures to address flexion contractures and angular deviation at the IP joint level. However, several primary factors contribute to the complexity of central polydactyly reconstruction. Hypoplastic joints and soft tissues that predispose the reconstructed finger to joint contracture, and angular deformities as well as complex tendon anomalies, are often difficult to address. Therefore, treatment is wholly dependent on the anatomic components present, the degree of syndactyly, and the function of the duplicated finger.

== Epidemiology ==
The condition has an estimated occurrence of 0.3–3.6 per 1000 live births. Postaxial hand polydactyly is most frequent in the United States in Black males. Preaxial polydactyly occurs in 0.08 to 1.4 in 1,000 live births. In the United States, it is more common in White people and also relatively frequent in Native American and Asian people. A 1994 study by Finley et al. combined data from Jefferson County, Alabama, United States, and Uppsala County, Sweden. This study found incidence of all types of polydactyly at rates of 2.3 per 1000 live births of White males, 0.6 per 1000 live births of White females, 13.5 per 1000 live births of Black males, and 11.1 per 1000 live births of Black females.

== Society and culture ==
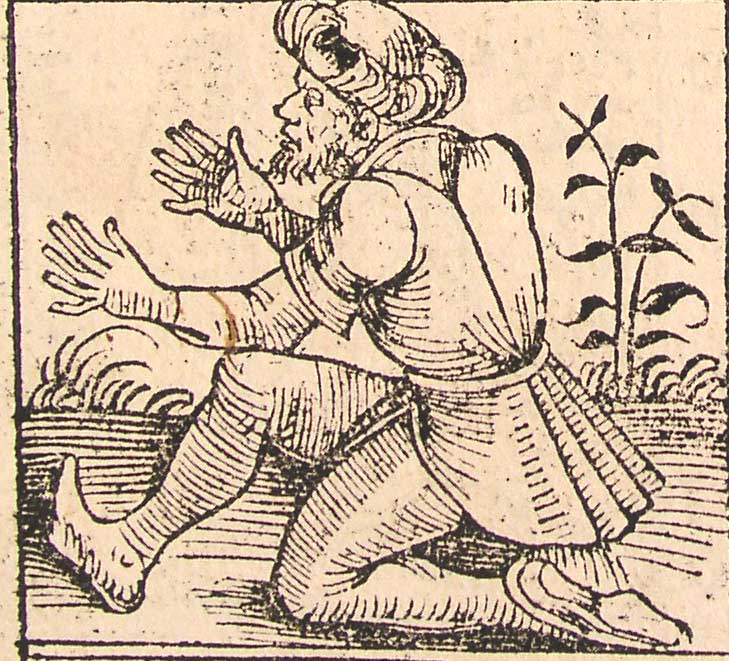
Twelve-fingered man, illustrated in the 1493 Nuremberg Chronicles

=== People affected ===
- Antonio Alfonseca, retired MLB professional baseball pitcher known as El Pulpo (Spanish for "the Octopus") for his extra digit on each extremity.
- Endre Ady, Hungarian poet born with six fingers, but one was removed as a child. The poet later interpreted it as a sign of his selection (according to the ancient Hungarian belief, the táltos are born with more bones, such as six fingers).
- Brites de Almeida, a legendary Portuguese woman who killed seven hiding Castilian soldiers in her oven after the Battle of Aljubarrota, had six fingers on each hand.
- The actress Gemma Arterton was born with six fingers on each hand, the boneless additional fingers being removed after birth.
- The actor David Tennant has an extra toe on his right foot.
- Robert Chambers, purported author of Vestiges of the Natural History of Creation, and his brother William had six digits on each limb.
- Lucille Clifton, an African-American poet and civil rights advocate.
- Zerah Colburn, American prodigious math calculating savant.
- Calvin Choy, a Hong Konger singer and actor nicknamed "Sir One One" (Sir11) as he has six digits on his right hand.
- Fourteen members of a Da Silva family in São Paulo, Brazil, have six functional fingers on each hand (the thumb is doubled) and six toes on each foot.
- Danny Garcia, boxing champion, has six toes on his right foot.
- Yoandri Hernández Garrido, nicknamed Veinticuatro ("twenty four" in Spanish), has six fully formed fingers on both hands and six perfect toes on each foot.
- Hampton Hawes, jazz pianist, was born with six fingers on each hand (the extra fingers were surgically removed shortly after birth).
- Henry II the Pious, High Duke of Poland 1238–1241, had six toes on his left foot.
- A boy named Hong Hong born in Pingjiang County, Hunan province, China, has 31 fingers and toes.
- Kamani Hubbard, a boy in California, was born in 2009 with a rare case of polydactyly, with 12 fingers and 12 toes, all fully functional.
- Johann Jacob Freiherr von Moscon (1621–1661), Lower Styrian baron, is depicted with six fingers at his left hand on a portrait from Brežice, Slovenia.
- Rankin Mansfield, American stage and screen character actor and stage director, had, as per two separate eyewitnesses (one, an erstwhile fellow stage performer; the other, a writer in whose childhood home he had sometimes dined), an extra thumb on one hand, which, according to the aforementioned fellow diner, "grew sideways out of the other, simple as that".
- Nayanthara, an Indian actress, has a rudimentary finger on her left hand.
- Jiang Qing, Mao Zedong's fourth wife, reportedly had six toes on her right foot.
- Hrithik Roshan, a Bollywood actor born with a supernumerary thumb on his right hand.
- J. J. Weaver, an American college football outside linebacker, has six fingers on his right hand.
- Akshat Saxena from Uttar Pradesh, India, is the world record holder for highest number of digits. He was born in 2010 with seven digits on each hand and 10 digits on each foot, for a total of 34 digits.
- Garfield Sobers, West Indian cricketer, had an extra finger on each hand which he removed himself during childhood "with the aid of catgut and a sharp knife".
- Theodore Roosevelt "Hound Dog" Taylor, Chicago-based American blues guitarist, was born with polydactyly on both hands, although around age 41, he removed the extra finger on his right hand.
- Varalakshmi V, a girl from Bangalore with eight fingers on each hand and about four to five extra toes on each foot.
- Volcacius Sedigitus, a Roman poet of the 1st century, probably received his epithet, signifying "Sixfinger", because he was born with six fingers on each hand, according to Pliny.
- Zhu Yunming, a Chinese calligrapher, had six fingers on his right hand.
- Reggy B, a drag queen and contestant on the second season of Drag Race Holland, revealed on the show that he was born with an extra thumb on his left hand, three extra toes on one foot, and two extra toes on his other foot. His extra fingers and toes were surgically removed at a young age.

==== Fictional people ====
- In The Jewel of Seven Stars by Bram Stoker, the Egyptian Queen Tera has seven fingers on one hand and seven toes on one foot.
- In The Silence of the Lambs, Hannibal Lecter is described as having mid-ray duplication polydactyly (a duplicated middle finger) on his left hand, which he later removes in Hannibal as part of his cosmetic surgery to disguise himself.
- In the Disney XD 2012 cartoon series Gravity Falls, Stanford Pines ("Grunkle Ford") has six fingers on both of his hands, a trait which also identifies him in the show's mythology. He uses a tracing of his left hand to create the iconic gold detail on the covers of each of his journals.
- In The Chrysalids, the character Sophie has six toes on one of her feet and this is a major plot point of the novel, and features on the cover art for the earliest editions of the book.
- Tyrone Rugen, a Count in The Princess Bride, is described many times as "the six-fingered man".
- Void, an antagonist of the manga series Berserk, has six fingers on each hand.
- Zigzag, an antagonist from The Thief and the Cobbler, has six fingers on each hand.
- Billy, a character from Adventure Time, has six fingers on each hand.
- Kinzo Ushiromiya, the head of the Ushiromiya household from the visual novel Umineko When They Cry, has six toes on each foot. Among the many previous Ushiromiya family heads, those with polydactyly are known for their wisdom.
- In For Better or For Worse, Leah Nichols was born with 6 fingers on each hand.
- In Gattaca, Ryan Dorin plays a pianist with six fingers on each hand who throws his gloves to the audience at the concert's end.
- Fringe episode introductions and breaks sometimes display a six-fingered palm print, as well as on a wall in the episode An Enemy of Fate.
- Frank Nunn, Trudy Monk's assassin in the series Monk, is also known as the "six-fingered man".
- Numerous members of the Comyn, the ruling families on Darkover, have six fingers on each hand, supposedly inherited from non-human ancestors.

== Other animals ==
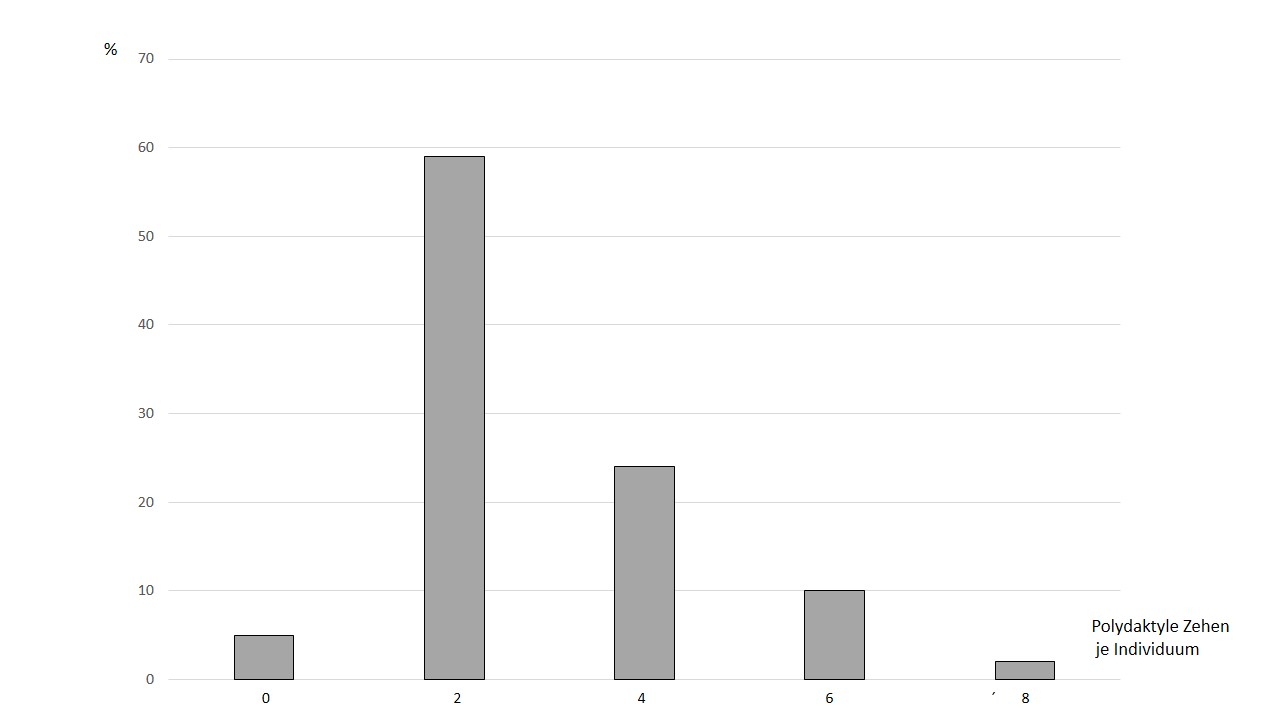
Biased number of polydactylous toes in a Maine Coon population

Polydactyly occurs in numerous types of animals. The condition is sporadically seen in livestock, where it affects cattle, sheep, pigs, and occasionally horses. Conversely, it is a common trait in several heritage chicken breeds. Chickens normally have 4 toes on each foot. The chicken breeds known for being polydactyl are the Dorking, Faverolle, Houdan, Lincolnshire Buff, Meusienne, Sultan, and non-bearded Silkie Bantams. The breed standard of these varieties of chickens calls for five toes on each foot, although sometimes more than five toes will occur. The extra digit in these breeds presents as an extra "thumb" that does not touch the ground. Mixed-breed chickens may also have extra digits if the aforementioned breeds are part of their genetic makeup.

Polydactyly also occurs in dogs, cats, and small mammals such as guinea pigs and mice. Cats normally have five digits on the front paws and four on the rear. Polydactyl cats have more, and this is a moderately common condition, especially in certain cat populations. Dogs, like other canids, normally have four claws on their rear paws; a fifth is often called a dewclaw and is especially found in certain dog breeds, including the Norwegian Lundehund and Great Pyrenees.

A number of mutations of the LMBR1 gene, in dogs, humans, and mice, can cause polydactyly. A 2014 report indicated that mice could also exhibit polydactyly arising from mutation in the VPS25 gene. In cattle, it appears to be polygenic with a dominant gene at one locus and a homozygous recessive at another.

Polydactyly is believed to have been common in early tetrapods, particularly the extinct amphibians that represented the earliest landliving vertebrates. Their number of toes fluctuated until the early Carboniferous period when they finally began developing a uniform number of toes. Amniotes settled on five toes per limb, while amphibians developed four toes on each front limb and five toes on each back limb. (For more information, see Polydactyly in early tetrapods.) Polydactyly also occurs in modern extant reptiles and amphibians. Polydactyly was a non-pathological, reacquired condition in extinct marine reptiles such as ichthyosaurs and hupehsuchians, some of which containing upwards of ten digits within their flippers.

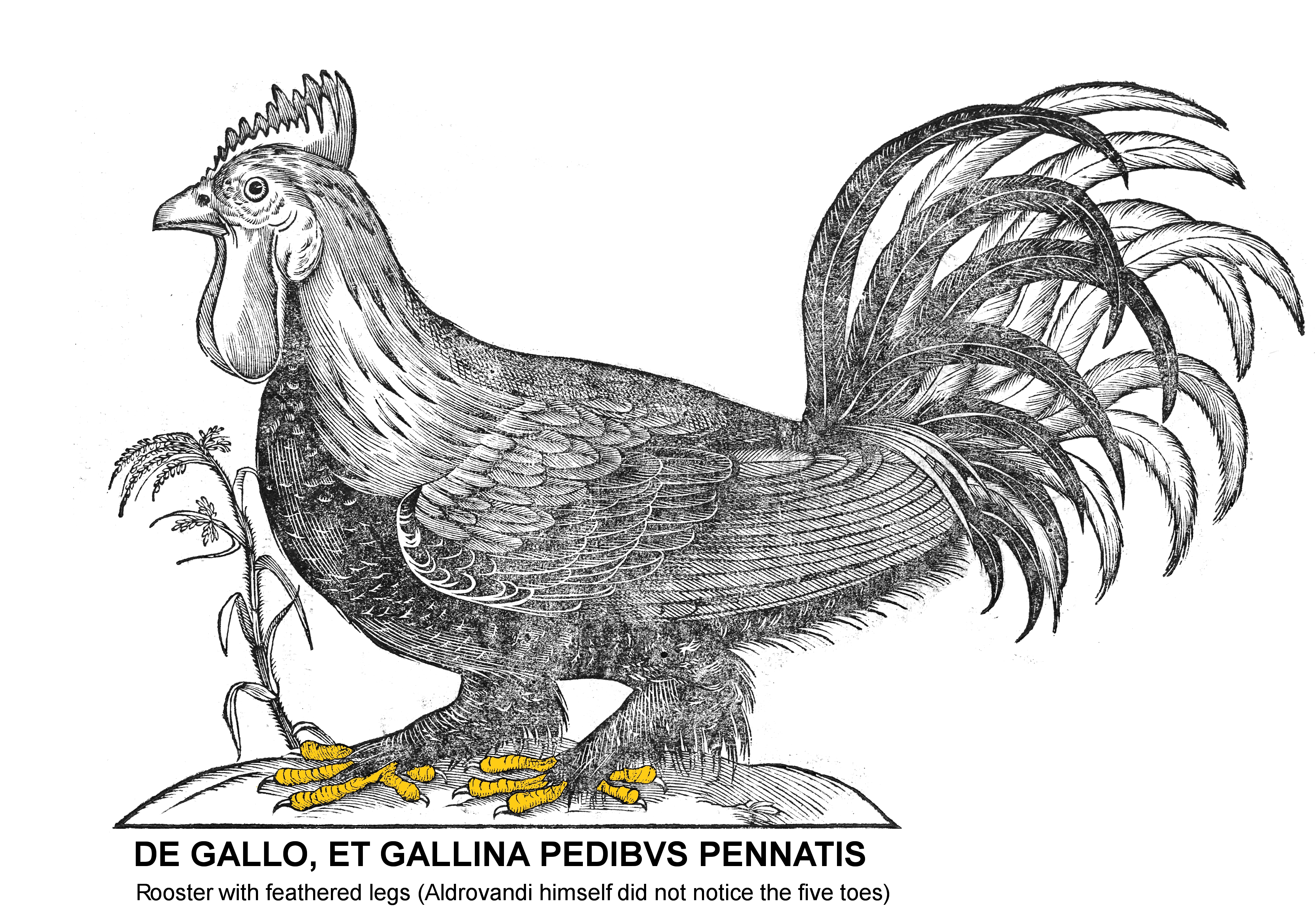
Rooster with feathered legs (Aldrovandi himself did not notice the five toes)

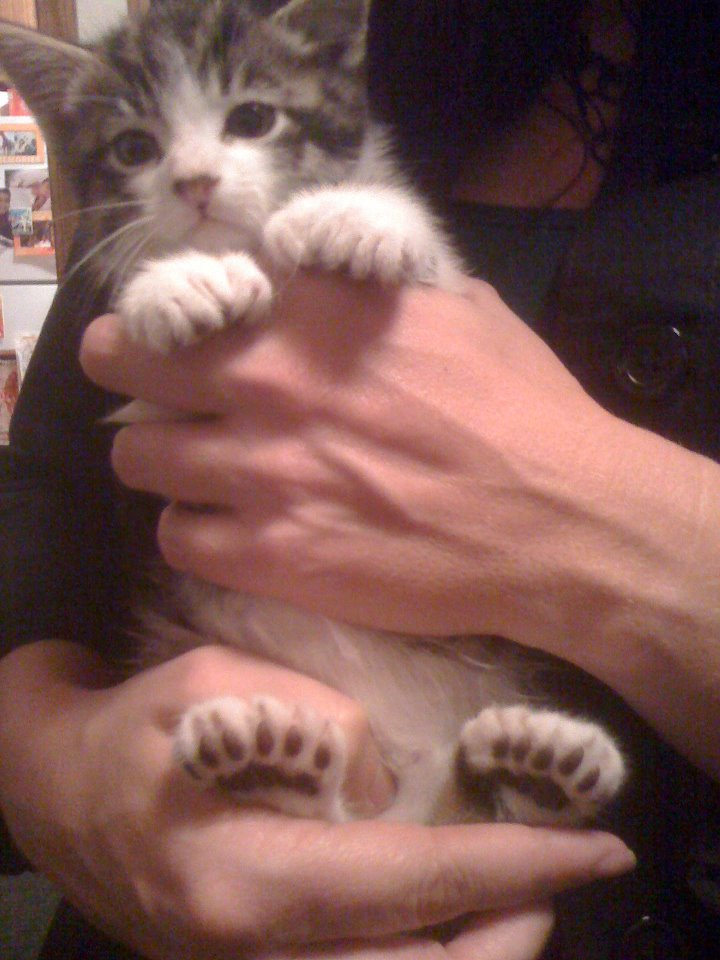
Kitten with 23 toes

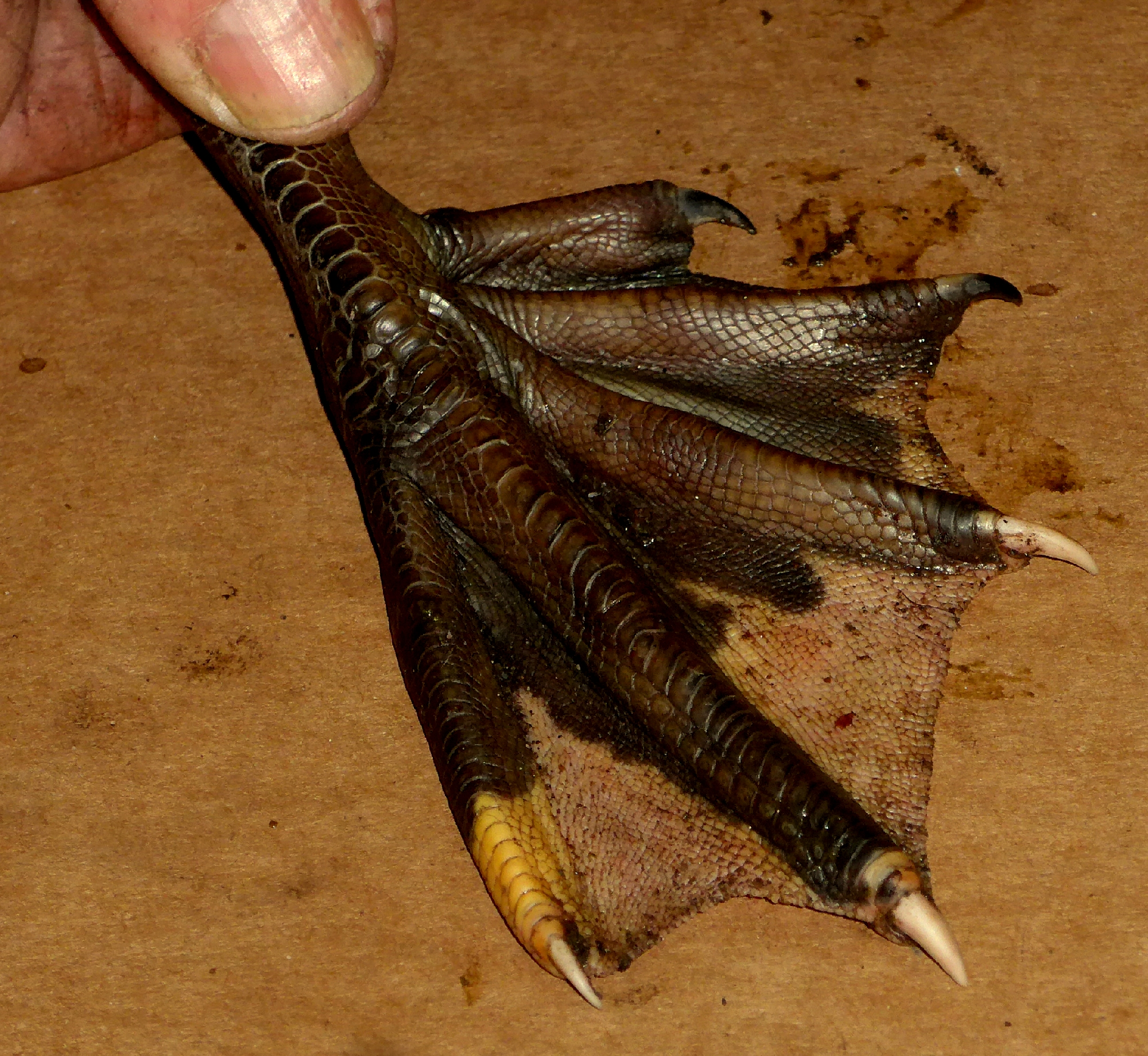
Muscovy duck, both feet have five toes

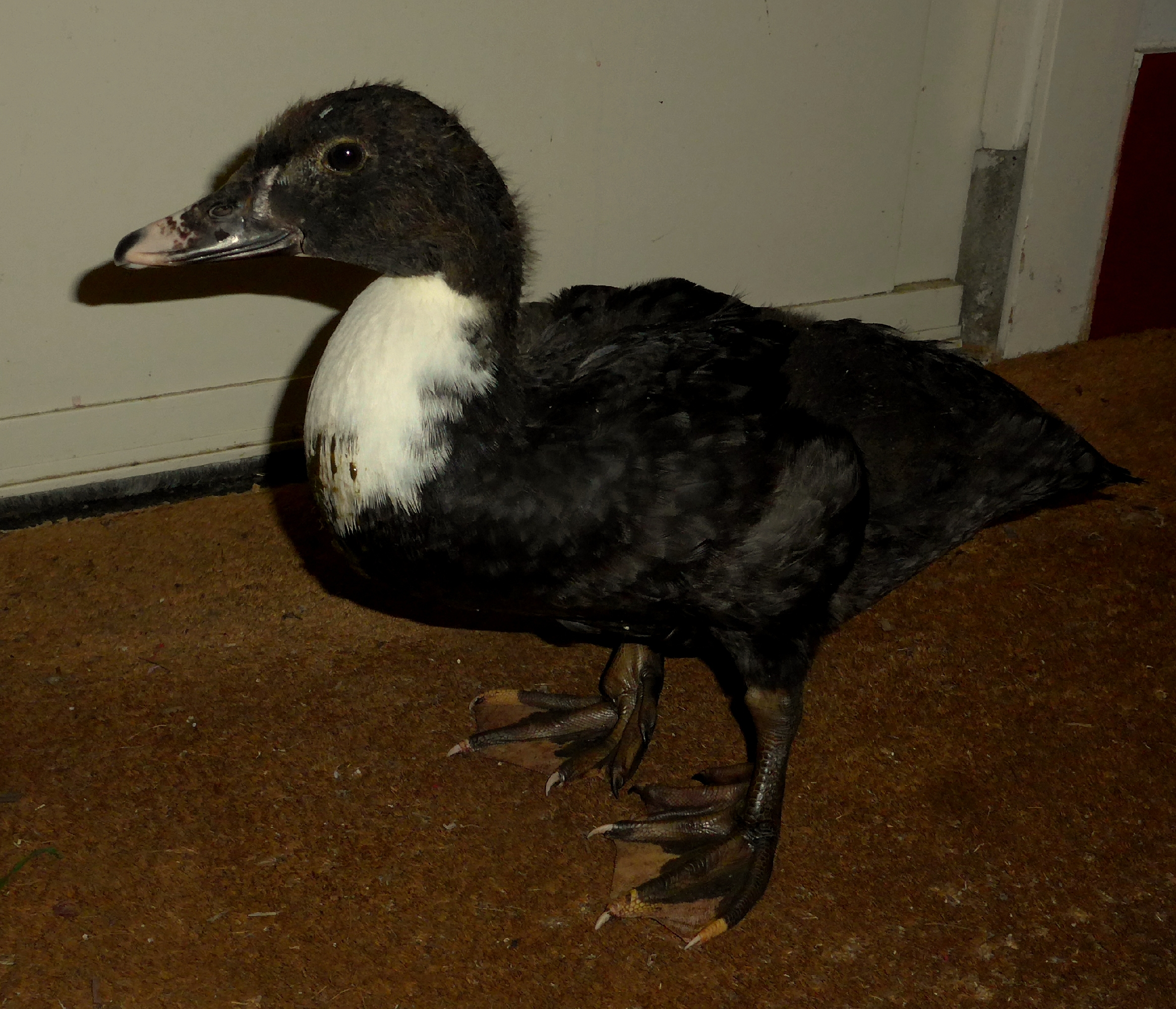
Muscovy duck, both feet have five toes

== See also ==
- Mirror polydactyly-vertebral segmentation-limb defects syndrome
