= Syndactyly =

Condition of fingers or toes being fused together at birth

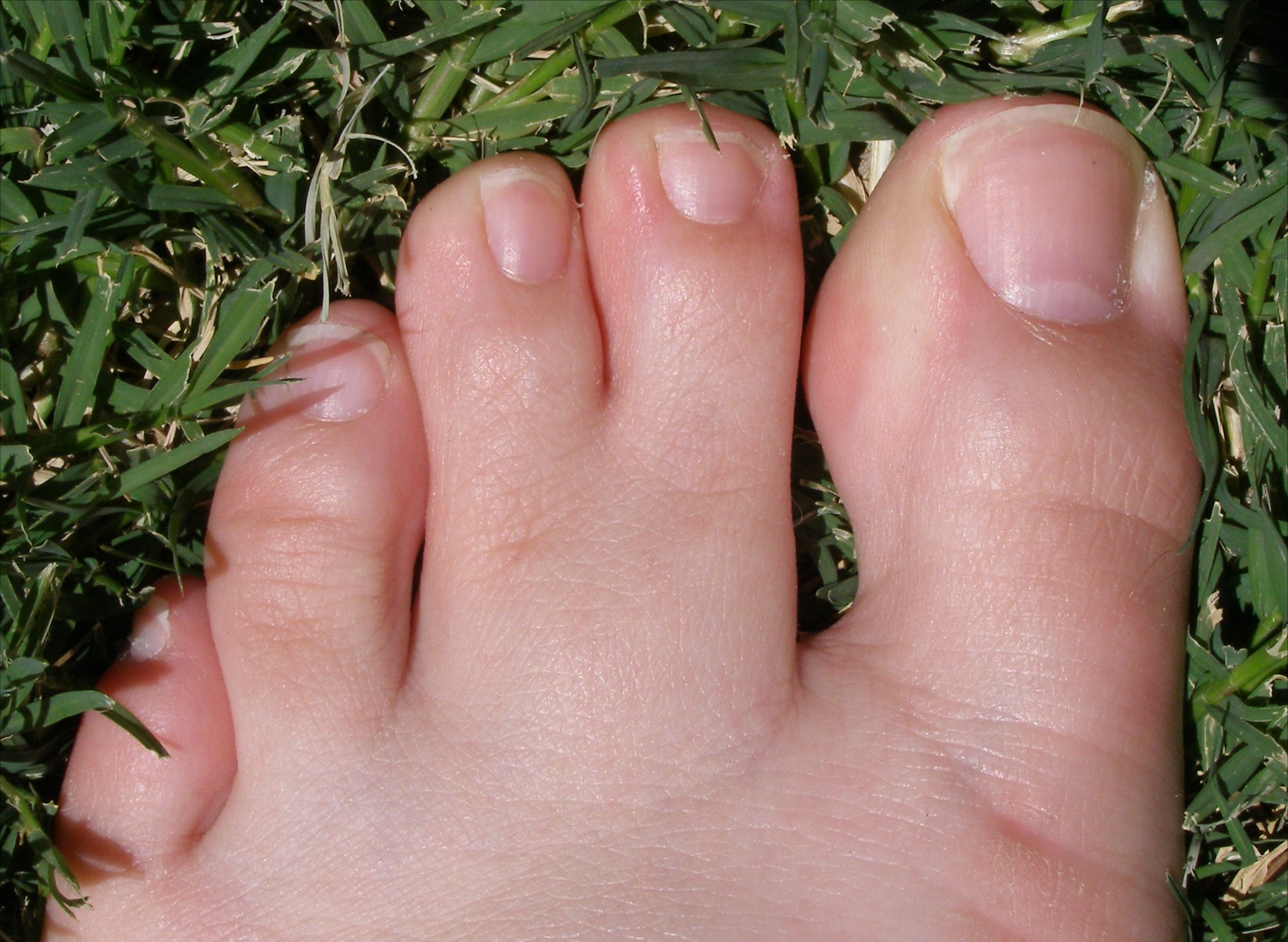
- Partial simple syndactyly in the second and third toes
- Specialty: Medical genetics

Syndactyly is a condition wherein two or more digits are fused together. It occurs normally in some metatherian mammals, but is an unusual condition in humans. The term is from Ancient Greek σύν (syn) 'together' and δάκτυλος (daktulos) 'finger'.

== Classification ==
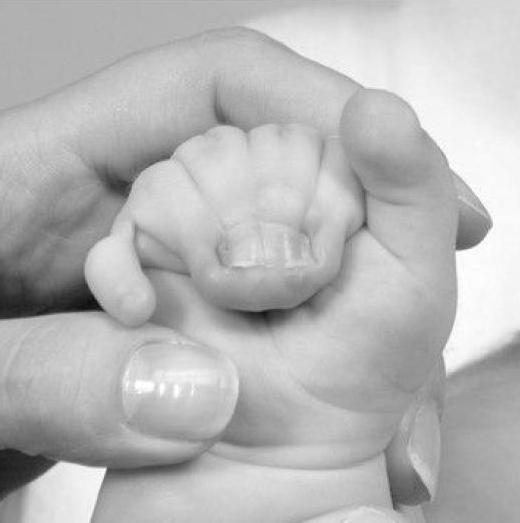
The hand of a person with Greig cephalopolysyndactyly with syndactyly of several digits

Syndactyly can be simple or complex.

- In simple syndactyly, adjacent fingers or toes are joined by soft tissue.
- In complex syndactyly, the bones of adjacent digits are fused. The kangaroo exhibits complex syndactyly.

Syndactyly can be complete or incomplete.

- In complete syndactyly, the skin is joined all the way to the tip of the involved digits.
- In incomplete syndactyly, the skin is only joined part of the distance to the tip of the involved digits.

Complex syndactyly occurs as part of a syndrome (such as Apert syndrome) and typically involves more digits than simple syndactyly.

Fenestrated syndactyly, also known as acrosyndactyly or terminal syndactyly, means the skin is joined for most of the digit but in a proximal area there are gaps in the syndactyly with normal skin. This type of syndactyly is found in amniotic band syndrome.

Simple syndactyly can be full or partial, and is present at birth (congenital). In early human fetal development, webbing (syndactyly) of the toes and fingers is normal. At about 6 weeks of gestation, apoptosis takes place due to a protein named sonic hedgehog, also known as SHH, which dissolves the tissue between the fingers and toes, and the webbing disappears. In some fetuses, this process does not occur completely between all fingers or toes and some residual webbing remains.

== Genetics ==
Five types of syndactyly have been identified in humans. The corresponding loci associated with these types and their common phenotypical expression are as follows:

- type I: 2q34-q36; webbing occurs between middle and ring fingers and/or second and third toes.
- type II: 2q31; also involves long and ring fingers, but has a sixth finger merged in between.
- type III: 6q21-q23; small finger is merged into the ring finger.
- type IV: 7q36; involves all fingers and/or toes.
- type V: 2q31-q32; similar to type I, but the metacarpals and metatarsals may also be fused.

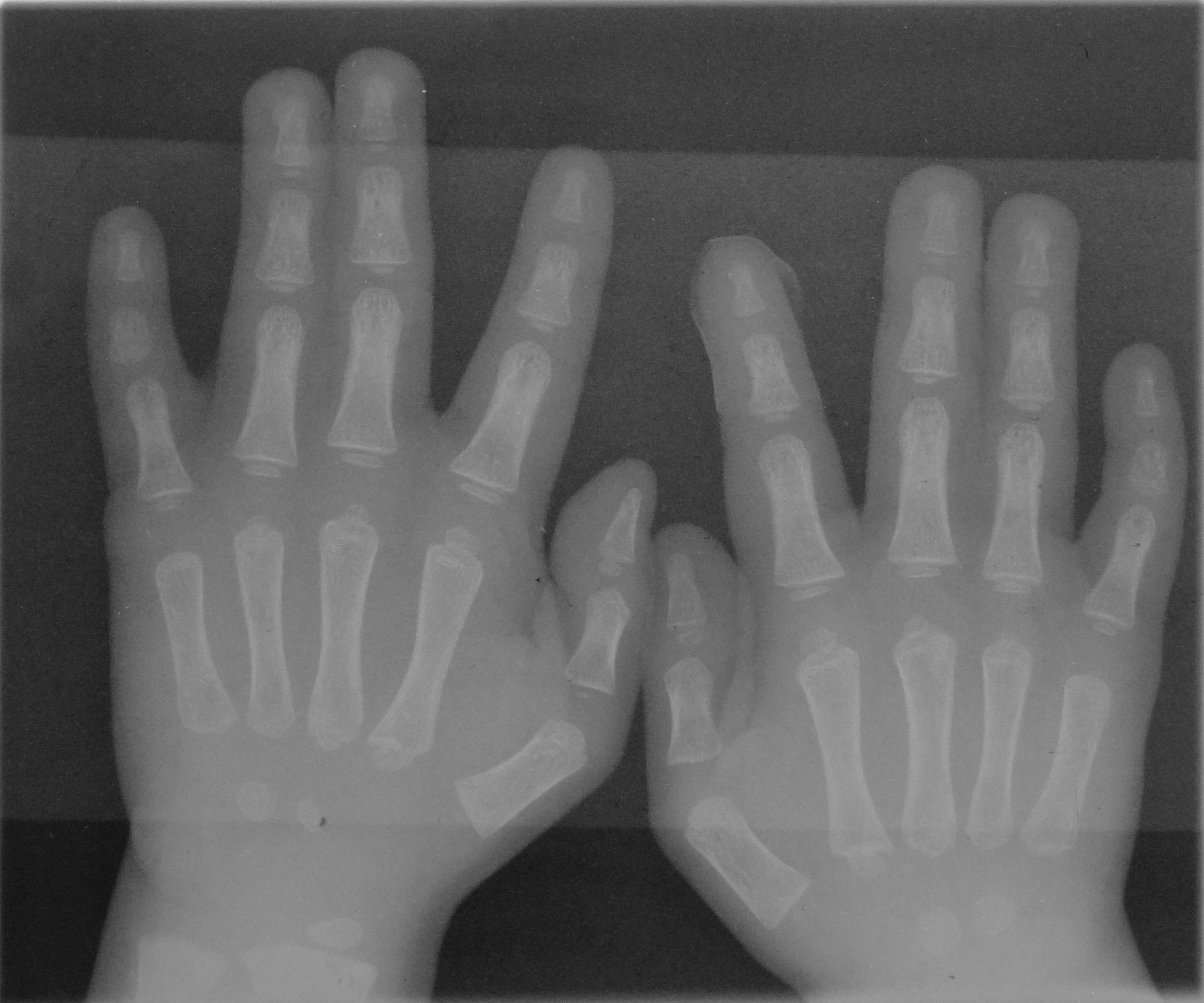
Radiograph of Type 1 syndactyly of the hands (no bony involvement)

== Management ==
Syndactyly of the border digits (thumb/index finger or ring/small fingers) is treated at early age to prevent the larger digit from curving towards the smaller digit with growth. Typically, syndactyly of these digits is treated at six months of age. The treatment of syndactyly of the other digits is elective and is more commonly performed when the digits have grown, at 18 months of age. Special situations, such as complex syndactyly and involvement of border digits, may warrant surgical intervention earlier than 6 months.

=== Techniques ===
Because the circumference of the conjoined fingers is smaller than the circumference of the two separated fingers, there is not enough skin to cover both digits once they are separated at the time of surgery. Therefore, the surgeon must bring new skin into the area at the time of surgery. This is most commonly done with a skin graft (from groin or anterior elbow). Skin can also be used from the back of the hand by mobilizing it (called a "graftless" syndactyly correction), which requires planning over a period of months prior to surgery.

=== Complications ===
The most common problem with syndactyly correction is creeping of the skin towards the fingertip over time. This is likely due to tension at the site of the repair between the digits. Additional surgery may be required to correct this. One critique of using skin grafts is that the grafts darken in the years after surgery and become more noticeable. Also, if the skin grafts are harvested from the groin area, the skin may grow hair. Finally, the fingers may deviate after surgery. This is most commonly seen in complex syndactyly (when there has been a bone joining of the fingers).

== History ==
Drawing depicting a man with syndactyly and maybe phocomelia (Nicolas Huet the Younger, 1812).

The earliest written mention of syndactyly is in the Mishnah, the collection of Jewish law redacted in approximately 200 CE, which contains an analysis of which forms of syndactyly constitute an imperfection severe enough to disqualify a priest from performing the Temple service. Another early appreciation of syndactyly as a birth anomaly or burn-trauma can be traced back to the Andalusian Muslim surgeon Al-Zahrawi (d. 1013 CE), known in the West as Abulcasis. The French barber surgeon Ambroise Paré also described syndactyly in the sixteenth century.

Notable sufferers in modern times include Welsh comedian Rhod Gilbert, whose syndactyly affects two fingers of his left hand.

== See also ==
- Dactyly, the arrangement of fingers and toes in different kinds of animals
- Webbed toes, the common name for syndactyly affecting the feet
