= List of diseases (B) =

This is a list of diseases starting with the letter "B".

== Ba ==
=== Bab–Bam ===
- Baber's syndrome
- Babesiosis
- Baby Mammoth Disease
- Bacillus cereus infection
- Bacterial endocarditis
- Bacterial food poisoning
- Bacterial gastroenteritis
- Bacterial meningitis
- Bacterial pneumonia
- Bacterial vaginosis
- Bagatelle–Cassidy syndrome
- Bahemuka–Brown syndrome
- Baker–Vinters syndrome
- Baker–Winegard syndrome
- Balantidiasis
- Ballard syndrome
- Ballistophobia
- Balo disease
- Balo's concentric sclerosis
- Bamforth syndrome

=== Ban ===
- BANF acoustic neurinoma
- Bangstad syndrome
- Banki syndrome
- Bannayan–Zonana syndrome
- Banti's syndrome
- Bantu siderosis

=== Bar ===
- Baraitser–Brett–Piesowicz syndrome
- Baraitser–Rodeck–Garner syndrome
- Barber–Say syndrome
- Barbiturate dependence
- Barbiturate overdose
- Bardet–Biedl syndrome

- Bardet–Biedl syndrome, type 1
- Bardet–Biedl syndrome, type 2
- Bardet–Biedl syndrome, type 3
- Bardet–Biedl syndrome, type 4

- Bare lymphocyte syndrome 2
- Bare lymphocyte syndrome
- Baritosis
- Barnicoat–Baraitser syndrome
- Barrett syndrome
- Barrow–Fitzsimmons syndrome
- Barth syndrome
- Bartonella infections
- Bartsocas–Papas syndrome
- Bartter syndrome, antenatal form
- Bartter syndrome, classic form

=== Bas–Baz ===
- Basal cell carcinoma
- Basal cell nevus anodontia abnormal bone mineralization
- Basal ganglia diseases
- Basan syndrome
- Basaran–Yilmaz syndrome
- Basedow's coma
- Basilar artery migraines
- Basilar impression primary
- Bassoe syndrome
- Bathophobia
- Batrachophobia
- Battaglia–Neri syndrome
- Batten disease
- Batten–Turner muscular dystrophy
- Baughman syndrome
- Bazex–Dupré–Christol syndrome
- Bazopoulou–Kyrkanidou syndrome
- Baz Effect

== Bc–Bd ==
- B-cell lymphomas
- Bd syndrome

== Be ==
=== Bea–Bel ===
- Beals syndrome
- Beardwell syndrome
- Bébé–Collodion syndrome
- Becker disease
- Becker's muscular dystrophy
- Becker's nevus
- Beemer–Ertbruggen syndrome
- Beemer–Langer syndrome
- Behcet syndrome
- Behr syndrome
- Behrens–Baumann–Dust syndrome
- Bejel
- Bellini–Chiumello–Rinoldi syndrome
- Bell's palsy

=== Ben–Ber ===
- Ben Ari Shuper Mimouni syndrome
- Benallegue–Lacete syndrome
- Bencze syndrome
- Benign astrocytoma
- Benign autosomal dominant myopathy
- Benign congenital hypotonia
- Benign essential blepharospasm
- Benign essential tremor syndrome
- Benign familial hematuria
- Benign familial infantile convulsions
- Benign familial infantile epilepsy
- Benign fasciculation syndrome
- Benign lymphoma
- Benign mucosal pemphigoid
- Benign myoclonic epilepsy
- Benign paroxysmal positional vertigo
- Bentham Driessen Hanveld syndrome
- Benzodiazepine dependence
- Benzodiazepine overdose
- Benzodiazepine withdrawal syndrome
- Berardinelli–Seip congenital lipodystrophy
- Berdon syndrome
- Berger disease
- Beriberi
- Berlin breakage syndrome
- Berlin's edema
- Berry aneurysm, cirrhosis, pulmonary emphysema, and cerebral calcification
- Berylliosis
- Beta ketothiolase deficiency
- Beta-galactosidase-1 deficiency
- Beta-mannosidosis
- Beta-sarcoglycanopathy
- Beta-thalassemia
- Bethlem myopathy

== Bh ==
- Bhaskar Jagannathan syndrome

== Bi ==
=== Bib–Bil ===
- Bickel Fanconi glycogenosis
- Bicuspid aortic valve
- Bidirectional tachycardia
- Biemond syndrome

- Biemond syndrome type 1
- Biemond syndrome type 2

- Biermer disease
- Bifid nose dominant
- Bilateral renal agenesis dominant type
- Bilateral renal agenesis
- Biliary atresia, extrahepatic
- Biliary atresia, intrahepatic, non syndromic form
- Biliary atresia, intrahepatic, syndromic form
- Biliary atresia
- Biliary cirrhosis
- Biliary hypoplasia
- Biliary malformation renal tubular insufficiency
- Biliary tract cancer
- Billard Toutain Maheut syndrome
- Billet Bear syndrome

=== Bin–Bix ===
- Bindewald–Ulmer–Muller syndrome
- Binswanger's disease
- Bipolar disorder

- Bipolar I disorder
- Bipolar II disorder

- Biotin deficiency
- Biotinidase deficiency
- Bird headed dwarfism Montreal type
- Birdshot chorioretinopathy
- Birt–Hogg–Dubé syndrome
- Bixler–Christian–Gorlin syndrome

== Bj–Bk ==
- Björnstad syndrome
- BK virus nephritis

== Bl ==
=== Bla–Ble ===
- Black piedra
- Bladder and prostate diseases
- Bladder neoplasm
- Blamronesis
- Blaichman syndrome
- Blastoma
- Blastomycosis
- Blepharitis
- Blepharo cheilo dontic syndrome
- Blepharo facio skeletal syndrome
- Blepharo naso facial syndrome Van maldergem type
- Blepharoptosis-myopia-ectopia lentis syndrome
- Blepharonasofacial malformation syndrome
- Blepharophimosis nasal groove growth retardation
- Blepharophimosis ptosis esotropia syndactyly short
- Blepharophimosis ptosis syndactyly mental retardation
- Blepharophimosis syndrome Ohdo type
- Blepharophimosis, ptosis, epicanthus inversus
- Blepharophimosis
- Blepharoptosis aortic anomaly
- Blepharoptosis cleft palate ectrodactyly dental anomalies
- Blepharoptosis-myopia-ectopia lentis
- Blepharospasm
- Blethen–Wenick–Hawkins syndrome

=== Blo–Blu ===
- Blomstrand syndrome
- Blood coagulation disorders
- Blood platelet disorders
- Blood vessel disorder
- Bloom syndrome
- Blount's disease
- Blue cone monochromatism
- Blue diaper syndrome
- Blue rubber bleb nevus

== Bo ==
=== Bod–Boo ===
- BOD syndrome
- Boder syndrome
- Body dysmorphic disorder
- Boil
- Bolivian hemorrhagic fever
- Bone development disorder
- Bone dysplasia Azouz type
- Bone dysplasia corpus callosum agenesis
- Bone dysplasia lethal Holmgren type
- Bone dysplasia Moore type
- Bone fragility craniosynostosis proptosis hydrocephalus
- Bone marrow failure neurologic abnormalities
- Bone marrow failure
- Bone neoplasms
- Bone tumor (generic term)
- Bonneau–Beaumont syndrome
- Bonneman–Meinecke–Reich syndrome
- Bonnemann–Meinecke syndrome
- Bonnevie–Ullrich–Turner syndrome
- Book syndrome
- Boomerang dysplasia
- Booth– Haworth–Dilling syndrome

=== Bor–Boy ===
- Borderline personality disorder
- Borjeson syndrome
- Bork–Stender–Schmidt syndrome
- Borreliosis
- Borrone–Di Rocco–Crovato syndrome
- Boscherini–Galasso–Manca–Bitti syndrome
- Bosma–Henkin–Christiansen syndrome
- Bothriocephalosis
- Botulism
- Boucher-Neuhäuser syndrome
- Boudhina-Yedes-Khiari syndrome
- Bourneville's disease
- Bowen's disease
- Bowen–Conradi syndrome
- Bowenoid papulosis
- Bowen's disease
- Bowing congenital short bones
- Bowing of long bones congenital
- Boylan–Dew–Greco syndrome

== Br ==
=== Bra ===
==== Brac ====
===== Brach =====
====== Brachi–Brachm ======
- Brachioskeletogenital syndrome
- Brachman-de Lange syndrome

====== Brachy ======
Brachyc

- Brachycephalofrontonasal dysplasia
- Brachycephaly deafness cataract mental retardation

Brachyd

- Brachydactylous dwarfism Mseleni type

Brachydactyly

- Brachydactyly

Brachydactyly a – Brachydactyly s

- Brachydactyly absence of distal phalanges
- Brachydactyly anonychia
- Brachydactyly clinodactyly
- Brachydactyly dwarfism mental retardation
- Brachydactyly-elbow wrist dysplasia syndrome
- Brachydactyly hypertension
- Brachydactyly long thumb type
- Brachydactyly mesomelia mental retardation heart defects
- Brachydactyly nystagmus cerebellar ataxia
- Brachydactyly preaxial hallux varus
- Brachydactyly scoliosis carpal fusion
- Brachydactyly small stature face anomalies
- Brachydactyly Smorgasbord type

Brachydactyly t

- Brachydactyly tibial hypoplasia
- Brachydactyly type A1
- Brachydactyly type A2
- Brachydactyly type A3
- Brachydactyly type A5 nail dysplasia
- Brachydactyly type A6
- Brachydactyly type A7
- Brachydactyly type B
- Brachydactyly type C
- Brachydactyly type D
- Brachydactyly type E
- Brachydactyly types B and E combined

Brachym–Brachyt

- Brachymesomelia renal syndrome
- Brachymesophalangy 2 and 5
- Brachymesophalangy mesomelic short limbs osseous anomalies
- Brachymesophalangy type 2
- Brachymetapody anodontia hypotrichosis albinoidism
- Brachymorphism onychodysplasia dysphalangism syndrome
- Brachyolmia recessive Hobaek type
- Brachyolmia
- Brachytelephalangy characteristic facies Kallmann

==== Brad–Braz ====
- Braddock–Carey syndrome
- Braddock–Jones–Superneau syndrome
- Bradykinesia
- Brain cavernous angioma
- Brain neoplasms
- Brain stem neoplasms
- Branchial arch defects
- Branchial arch syndrome X linked
- Branchio-oculo-facial syndrome Hing type
- Branchio-oculo-facial syndrome
- Branchio-oto-renal syndrome (BOR syndrome)
- Brazilian hemorrhagic fever

=== Bre–Bro ===
- Breast cancer

- Breast cancer, familial

- Breast and ovarian cancer
- Brief psychotic disorder
- Bright's disease
- Brittle bone disease

- Brittle bone syndrome lethal type

- Brittle cornea syndrome
- Broad beta disease
- Broad-betalipoproteinemia
- Bromidrosiphobia
- Bronchiectasis
- Bronchiectasis oligospermia
- Bronchiolitis obliterans with obstructive pulmonary disease
- Bronchiolotis obliterans organizing pneumonia (BOOP)
- Bronchitis, Chronic
- Bronchogenic cyst
- Bronchopulmonary amyloidosis
- Bronchopulmonary dysplasia
- Brown syndrome
- Brown-Séquard syndrome

=== Bru ===
- Brucellosis
- Bruck syndrome
- Brugada syndrome
- Brunoni syndrome
- Bruton type agammaglobulinemia
- Bruyn Scheltens syndrome

== Bu–Bz ==
- Bubonic plague
- Budd–Chiari syndrome
- Buerger's disease
- Bulbospinal amyotrophy, X-linked
- Bulimia nervosa
- Bull Nixon syndrome
- Bullous dystrophy macular type
- Bullous ichthyosiform erythroderma congenita
- Bullous pemphigoid
- Buntinx–Lormans–Martin syndrome
- Burkitt's lymphoma
- Burn–Goodship syndrome
- Burnett–Schwartz–Berberian syndrome
- Burning mouth syndrome- Type 3
- Burning mouth syndrome
- Buruli ulcer
- Buschke–Ollendorff syndrome
- Bustos–Simosa–Pinto–Cisternas syndrome
- Buttiens–Fryns syndrome
- Butyrylcholinesterase deficiency
- Byssinosis
