= Heart-hand syndrome, Slovenian type =

- Other names: Slovenian type heart-hand syndrome
- Images showing the characteristic small hands associated with this condition next to normal hands (lower left), mutation in the LMNA gene involved in the condition (lower right), pedigree of a family with Heart-hand syndrome, Slovenian type showing autosomal dominant inheritance (entire upper portion of image).
- Specialty: Medical genetics
- Symptoms: Symptoms affecting the heart and hands
- Complications: Sudden death
- Usual onset: Birth (minor physical defects of the feet and hands), Adulthood (heart problems)
- Duration: Lifelong
- Causes: Genetic mutation
- Prevention: none
- Prognosis: Medium
- Frequency: rare, approximately 21 cases from 2 families have been described in medical literature.
- Deaths: yes

Heart-hand syndrome, Slovenian type is a rare autosomal dominant genetic disorder belonging to the heart-hand syndromes.

== Signs and symptoms ==
Individuals with this condition typically exhibit progressive heart conduction disease, tachycardia, arrhythmia, dilated cardiomyopathy which begins during a patient's adulthood and congenital (from birth) minor physical anomalies such as clinodactyly, syndactyly and brachydactyly that affects the feet more than the hands.

== Complications ==
There are various complications associated with this syndrome, these are (but are not limited to):

- Sudden death associated with the cardiac problems characteristic of this condition.
- Pain while walking, self-consciousness/insecurity of one's foot associated with the brachymetatarsia characteristic of this condition.
- Self insecurity (sometimes) associated with brachydactyly

== Genetics ==
This condition is caused by a splice site mutation in the LMNA gene, located in chromosome 1. This mutation is inherited following an autosomal dominant manner.

== Diagnosis ==
There are various methods of diagnosis, some of them are:

=== Genetic testing/sequencing ===
In 2008, Renou et al. sequenced the LMNA gene of 12 members of the Slovenian family described by Sinkovec et al. and by doing this they identified a splice site mutation that was not found in 100 healthy control subjects without this type of heart-hand syndrome.

=== Radiographs ===
When radiographed, members of the Slovenian family reported by Sinkovec et al. were found to have various radiographic anomalies, these included the duplication of the second metatarsal's bases, terminal phalange symphalangism of the toes, extra foot ossicles, brachyphalangy, etc.

=== Electrocardiogram ===
Abnormal heart beats can be diagnosed through electrocardiograms.

== Prevalence ==
According to OMIM, only 21 cases from 2 Slovenian and Irish/German Canadian families have been described in medical literature.

== History ==
This condition was first discovered in 2005 by Sinkovec et al. when they described 10 members belonging to a 4-generation Slovenian family with progressive sinoatrial and atrioventricular conduction disease, ventricular tachyarrhythmia-associated sudden death, dilated cardiomyopathy, and a unique type of brachydactyly which affected the hands to a lesser extent than it affected the feet, it involved the following symptoms:

=== Hands ===
- Generalized brachyphalangy that affected all 3 of the phalanges of the fingers alongside clinodactyly.

=== Feet ===
- Brachyphalangy of the distal and proximal phalanges of the toes
- Hypoplastic or aplastic middle phalanges of the toes
- Brachymetatarsia
- Terminal symphalangism
- duplication of the bases of the second metatarsals
- extra ossicles
- Toe syndactyly.

== Eponym ==
This condition's name originates from the fact that the first family described in medical literature with this association of symptoms was from Slovenia.

== See also ==
- Heart-hand syndromes
- Heart-hand syndrome, Spanish type
- Brachydactyly-long thumb syndrome
- Brachydactyly
- Brachymetatarsia
- Minor physical anomalies
- Congenital heart defects
