= Kirner's deformity =

- Other names: Dystelephangy, Congenital bilateral metadiaphyseal acrodysplasia of the little finger
- This trait is often hereditary, and is thought to be inherited in an autosomal dominant manner with reduced penetrance
- Specialty: Medical genetics
- Symptoms: Radial and volar curvature of the distal phalange of the fifth finger.
- Complications: None
- Types: There are congenital, early-onset, and acquired forms.
- Causes: Autosomal dominant inheritance
- Prevention: None
- Treatment: Usually, none is required, surgery is done due to cosmetic reasons
- Prognosis: Good
- Frequency: Uncommon, about 1 in 400-600 people are thought to have this deformity
- Deaths: Deaths are not involved with the deformity, since it isn't deadly.

Kirner's deformity, also known as dystelephalangy, is an uncommon genetic hand malformation which is characterized by a radial and volar curvature of the distal phalange of the fifth (pinky) finger. It is merely cosmetic and doesn't affect hand function.

== Etymology ==
This condition is considered to be a type of isolated brachydactyly.

A.R. Thomas et al. described it as a "dystrophy of the fifth finger".

== History ==
This difference was first discovered in 1927 by Kirner et al., when he described a 13-year-old girl with the characteristic radial and volar curvature of the fifth finger's distal phalanx bone.

== Signs and symptoms ==
This anomaly is characterized by the painless curvature and "bulbing" of the distal end of the little finger. The time of onset varies among people, but the two most common ages of onset are birth and adolescence, although there can be cases where one is already born with a Kirner's deformity that worsens as one grows older (progressive).

Rarely, multiple fingers (which may or may not include the little finger) may be affected with Kirner's deformity; this is known as polytopic dystelephalangy, and cases like this typically have a strong genetic link.

Other isolated congenital deformities of the hand can occur alongside this deformity; one such instance is the family described by Erduran et al., which presented both camptodactyly and Kirner's deformity.

== Radiological findings ==
The following list comprises the radiological findings associated with Kirner's deformity that have been described in medical literature:

- Diaphyseal shortening
- Diaphyseal curvature
- Epiphyseal curvature
- Sclerosing of the diaphyses
- Agenesis of the little finger's flexor digitorum superficialis tendon
- Abnormal cartilage placement of the diaphyses and the flexor tendon
- Radiolucent nidus in the little finger's distal tuft
- L-shaped physis

== Causes ==
This deformity is caused by a widening of the epiphyseal plate of the fifth finger's distal phalange. Another proposed cause involves the abnormal insertion of the flexor digitorum profundus in the volar area of the fifth finger's distal phalange. It is thought to be an autosomal dominant trait with reduced penetrance.

== Diagnosis ==
This condition can be diagnosed by physical examination and radiographic imaging, including X-rays, magnetic resonance imaging, etc.

=== Differential diagnosis ===
This condition can be confused with other malformations (congenital and acquired) of the hand, these include:

- Camptodactyly
- Clinodactyly
- Mallet finger
- Fracture
- Brachydactyly type A3 (also known as brachymesophalangy type V)

== Epidemiology ==
This hand difference is estimated to be present in 0.15%-0.25% of the world population.

It is more common in women than in men; physical examination performed on people from a selected region in southern England by David and Burwood et al. found 18 individuals from 9 families with Kirner's deformity. Of these 18 individuals, 6 were men and 12 were women.

It has a higher incidence rate among the Japanese.

== Treatment ==
A handful of treatment methods resulting in successful improvement of Kirner's deformity have been described, these include:

- Bonola's technique
- Serial splinting
- Corrective osteotomy
- Physeal obliteration
- Distance lengthening

== Associations ==
The following subsections comprise Kirner deformity's non-syndromic and syndromic associations:

=== Non-syndromic ===
- Myositis ossificans
- High-arched foot
- Genu valgus
- Congenital heart defect

=== Syndromic ===
These are the syndromes associated with this malformation

- Turner syndrome
- Silver syndrome
- Cornelia de Lange syndrome
- Down syndrome

== See also ==
- Brachydactyly type D
- Syndactyly
- Minor physical anomalies
