= Commotio =

Commotio can refer to:

- Commotio (Nielsen), organ work composed 1930–1931
- Commotio cordis, heart injury
- Commotio retinae, known as Berlin's edema
- Commotio cerebri, medical name for concussion
