= Thumb stiffness-brachydactyly-intellectual disability syndrome =

- Other names: Stiff thumbs-brachydactyly-mental retardation, Piussan-Lenaerts-Mathieu syndrome
- Specialty: Medical genetics
- Symptoms: Minor physical anomalies and intellectual disabilities
- Complications: Usually, none
- Usual onset: Birth
- Duration: Life-long
- Causes: Genetic mutation
- Prevention: none
- Prognosis: Good
- Frequency: very rare, only two families known to have the disorder to medical literature

Thumb stiffness-brachydactyly-intellectual disability syndrome is a very rare genetic disorder which is characterized by thumb ankylosis due to symphalangism, brachydactyly type A, intellectual disabilities, mild facial dysmorphia and variable levels of obesity.

== Etymology ==
It was discovered when Piussan et al. described a three-generation family with various affected females in 1983, these females were reported to have "mental retardation, stiff thumbs, and brachydactyly type A2". Although C. Lewis symphalangism was suspected, it was clear that these symptoms were part of a new entity. A second isolated case was reported in 1990, by Barber et al., describing stiff thumbs and developmental delay. The suspected mode of inheritance of this disorder is autosomal dominant.
