= Heart-hand syndromes =

Rare deformities of both the heart and hands

- Other names: Atriodigital dysplasia
- Holt–Oram syndrome has an autosomal dominant pattern of inheritance.
- Specialty: Medical genetics

Heart-hand syndromes are a group of rare diseases that manifest with both heart and limb deformities.

As of July 2013, known heart-hand syndromes include Holt–Oram syndrome, Berk–Tabatznik syndrome, brachydactyly-long thumb syndrome, patent ductus arteriosus-bicuspid aortic valve syndrome, heart hand syndrome, Slovenian type and Heart-hand syndrome, Spanish type.

== Types ==
=== Heart-hand syndrome type 1 ===
Heart-hand syndrome type 1 is more commonly known as Holt–Oram syndrome. Is the most prevalent form of heart-hand syndrome.

It is an autosomal dominant disorder that affects bones in the arms and hands (the upper limbs) and may also cause heart problems. The syndrome includes an absent radial bone in the arms, an atrial septal defect, and a first degree heart block.

=== Heart-hand syndrome type 2 ===
Heart-hand syndrome type 2 is also known as Berk–Tabatznik syndrome. Berk–Tabatznik syndrome is a condition with an unknown cause that shows symptoms of short stature, congenital optic atrophy and brachytelephalangy. This condition is extremely rare with only two cases being found.

=== Heart-hand syndrome type 3 ===
Heart-hand syndrome type 3 is very rare and has been described only in three members of a Spanish family. It is also known as Heart-hand syndrome, Spanish type.

=== Heart-hand syndrome, Slovenian type ===
Several people in multiple generations have had this type. It causes sudden cardiac death due to ventricular tachycardia, and it prominently causes a unique type of brachydactyly with mild hand involvement and more severe foot involvement.

=== Brachydactyly-long thumb syndrome ===
Described in one family. A unique feature in the syndrome is symmetric brachydactyly with long thumbs.

=== Patent ductus arteriosus-bicuspid aortic valve syndrome ===
It has been confirmed that Patent ductus arteriosus-bicuspid aortic valve syndrome is a distinct syndrome from an allelic variant of Char syndrome. Hand anomalies include metacarpal hypoplasia.

== Genetics ==
It is unknown if heart-hand syndromes are caused by shared or distinct genetic defects. It has been claimed that congenital heart diseases are caused by a limited number of shared genetic defects.

Holt–Oram syndrome, Brachydactyly-long thumb syndrome, Patent ductus arteriosus-bicuspid aortic valve syndrome and Heart-hand syndrome, Slovenian type are known to be autosomally dominant disorders.

Brachydactyly-long thumb syndrome is known to have been transmitted from male-to-male in a single instance.

== See also ==
- Cardiovascular disease
- Congenital heart defect
- Congenital limb deformities
- Hand deformity
