= Berk–Tabatznik syndrome =

- Other names: Kyphosis brachyphalangy optic atrophy

Berk–Tabatznik syndrome is a medical condition with an unknown cause that shows symptoms of short stature, congenital optic atrophy and brachytelephalangy. This condition is extremely rare with only two cases being found.

== See also ==
- Heart-hand diseases
- Rare disease
