= Developmental theory of crime =

In 1993, American psychologist Terrie Moffitt described a dual taxonomy of offending behavior in an attempt to explain the developmental processes that lead to the distinctive shape of the age crime curve. Moffitt proposed that there are two main types of antisocial offenders in society: The adolescence-limited offenders, who exhibit antisocial behavior only during adolescence, and the life-course-persistent offenders, who begin to behave antisocially early in childhood and continue this behavior into adulthood. This theory is used with respect to antisocial behavior instead of crime due to the differing definitions of 'crime' among cultures. Due to similar characteristics and trajectories, this theory can be applied to both females and males.

== Antisocial Personality Disorder ==
Antisocial personality disorder (ASPD) is recognized by the Diagnostic and Statistical Manual of Mental Disorders (DSM-V). It is a disorder characterized by a severe disregard for the rights of others. In most of the studies described below, individuals who exhibit antisocial behavior, but have not been diagnosed with ASPD, are used as subjects.

=== Age and antisocial personality disorder ===
The number of arrests spikes in adolescence, but subsequently declines. This spike leads people to wonder whether more offenders are appearing or more offenses are committed by the same few offenders. Evidence shows that there is an increase in both. The most persistent 5% of offenders are responsible for more than 50% of known crimes committed.

Several experiments have been conducted to investigate the relationship between extremity and stability of offenses. In one such experiment a group of third grade boys was studied. Out of the most aggressive 5%, 39% of them scored above the 95th percentile on aggression ten years later, and 100% of them were above the median.

Aggression and antisocial behavior in a child is a predictor of adult antisocial behavior. Some 'difficult' children exhibit behavioral problems due to neurological dysfunctions. One study looked specifically at neurological damage and infant behavior in 66 low-birth-weight infants from intact middle-class families. These children exhibited traits such as immaturity, overactivity, temper tantrums, poor attention, and poor school performance. Each of the previous traits listed has been linked to antisocial behavior later in life. However, these children were not followed up with later in life to ensure their trajectory into crime.

=== Continuity and stability of antisocial behavior ===
The continuity and stability of antisocial behavior lies at the root of Moffitt's theory. The adolescent limited offenders exhibit antisocial behavior without stability over their lifetime, while life-course-persistent offenders typically display antisocial behavior from very early ages. Biting and hitting as early as age 4 followed by crimes such as shoplifting, selling drugs, theft, robbery, rape, and child abuse characterize a life course persistent offender.

Donker et al. presents a test concerning the prediction on the stability of longitudinal antisocial behavior. Two types of antisocial behavior were measured: covert, or behavior that focuses on deceit and theft, and overt, or behavior that involves direct confrontation and the threat of physical harm. This experiment documents subjects during three main periods of their life: childhood, 6–11 years of age, adolescence, 12–17 years of age, and adulthood, 20–25 years of age. Offenders that begin to show antisocial behavior in childhood that continues into adulthood are what Moffitt considers to be life-course-persistent offenders. Their delinquent behavior is attributed to several factors including neuropsychological impairments and negative environmental features. Moffitt predicts that "…estimates of the individual stability of antisocial behavior are expected to violate the longitudinal law, which states that relationships between variables become weaker as the time interval between them grows longer."

The original sample of children (ages 6–11) in 1983 consisted of 1,125 subjects. Three main areas were studied in the subjects: status violations, overt behavior, and covert behavior. Children exhibiting overt behavior were found to have two times greater risk for covert behavior as an adolescent and three times greater risk for it in adulthood. This violates the longitudinal law and proves Moffitt's expectations correct. Further results also supported this violation, but only with respect to overt behavior, not covert behavior. There is a difference in the continuity of antisocial behavior between men and women as well. In one longitudinal study an entire county's population was followed from age 8 to 48. Only 18% of the women who ranked high in antisocial behavior at age 8 rank high at age 48, while 47% of men stay in the high category. About 37% of both men and women, however, retained low antisocial behavior through age 48.

== Life-course-persistent offenders ==
=== Biological risk factors ===
The following biological risk factors have been linked to, but do not cause, persistent antisocial behavior throughout the life course.

==== Brain Injury ====
According to multiple studies, a correlation was found between brain insult suffered during delivery and later antisocial behavior. Also in acceleration-deceleration traumatic brain injury (TBI), an increase in aggression and antisocial behavior was recorded after the incident. Perhaps the most well documented injury associated with antisocial behavior is injury to the pre-frontal cortex. Damage to this part of the brain early in childhood correlates to an antisocial behavior that extends through the life-course.

==== Brain activity ====
Click to see labeled lobes

The right hemisphere is responsible for spatial awareness and orientation. Deficits on this side of the brain can lead to problems in facial and expression recognition. These impairments can do more than just interfere with early attachment and bonding. They can lead to adverse parenting due to the child's inappropriate responses to parental moods or expressions. In one experiment, 868 seven-year-old boys in Pennsylvania were divided into groups: one group on the life-course persistent offender path, one on the adolescent limited path, and one control group. A Continuous Performance Task test (CPT) was used to test frontal lobe function. Larger neurocognitive impairments were found in the life-course persistent group (LCP) than in the control group. Additionally, positron emission tomography (PET), near-infrared spectroscopy, and magnetoencephalography imaging studies have shown more right hemisphere activation during the CPT, so these results are consistent with right hemisphere dysfunction in subjects displaying antisocial behavior.
Reduced glucose metabolism in the pre-frontal cortex has been recorded in murderers compared with normal controls. Also, several other studies cited reduced blood flow in the same area. Recent studies indicate that abnormalities associated with antisocial behavior are localized in the orbitofrontal and dorsolateral prefrontal regions. The dorsolateral prefrontal cortex abnormality may predispose to "response perseveration" leading to a life-course-persistent antisocial behavior despite repeated punishment. Several other abnormalities of the brain have been found with relation to antisocial behavior such as reduced functioning of the amygdala, abnormal glucose metabolism in the temporal lobe, smaller volumes of the hippocampus, and lesser function of the anterior cingulate.

Spatial capabilities

In the previous Pennsylvania study, the life-course persistent (LCP) group showed significant impairments on spatial tests compared with the control group. No significant differences were shown between the adolescent limited (AL) group and the control group with respect to spatial IQ.

Verbal capabilities

Children exhibiting antisocial behavior early in life, many of whom are the same individuals who continue their trajectory into adulthood, often have difficulties with oral communication. Within the 868 Pennsylvania boys, the LCP group had significantly lower verbal IQ (and regular IQ) scores than the adolescent limited group, and no significant differences were shown between the adolescent limited (AL) group and the control group with respect to verbal IQ.

==== Minor physical anomalies ====
Moffitt writes, "Minor physical anomalies, which are thought to be observable markers for hidden anomalies in neural development, have been found at elevated rates among violent offenders and subjects with antisocial personality traits." Neural development in the fetus may also be affected by maternal drug abuse, poor prenatal nutrition, or prenatal/postnatal exposure to toxic agents. Minor physical anomalies (MPAs) are features such as low-seated ears, furrowed tongue, and adherent ear lobes. Evidence supporting the link between minor physical anomalies and antisocial behavior shows that the link only exists when adverse environmental factors are present.

=== Social risk factors ===
In many studies, the individuals displaying antisocial behavior developed in a family exhibiting "deviant behavior", in an "adverse home environment", or in something similar. However most studies do not specify the exact traits that characterize the tested 'deviant' or 'adverse' environment. Many that are cited include abuse, neglect, socioeconomic status, parental antisocial behavior, etc. There is no evidence that social factors, such as these, can induce antisocial behavior without accompanying biological factors.

=== Effect of biological and social risk factors together ===
Biological	Social
Genetic	Abuse
Brain Injury	Neglect
Brain Activity	Socioeconomic Status
Minor Physical Anomalies (MPAs)	Parental deviant behavior

Moffitt projects that initial biological predispositions combined with an adverse rearing environment will initiate the risk of life-course persistent antisocial behavior. She conducted a longitudinal study in New Zealand of boys exhibiting a range of antisocial tendencies. Of the 536 boys, 75 of them had adverse home environments and neuropsychological problems. Those 75 boys scored more than 4 times higher on aggression than the boys with adverse home environments or neuropsychological problems (one of the two). LCP offenders in the Pennsylvania study had higher levels of poverty than the control participants, and they had higher levels of neglect than both the control participants and the AL participants. Additionally, twin studies are often used to isolate effects of nature and nurture. In one such study, the highest criminal activity levels were witnessed in individuals whose foster families exhibited deviant behavior.

==== Genetic and environmental interactions ====
The first biological predisposition one thinks of is genetics. Despite Moffitt's original projection that life-course persistent antisocial behavior was more genetically influenced than the adolescent limited variety, a recent study found similar levels of genetic influence on both childhood-onset and adolescent-onset antisocial behavior. Childhood-onset antisocial behavior shares common genetic underpinnings with attention deficit hyperactivity disorder (ADHD) and young adult antisocial behavior, whereas adolescent-onset antisocial behavior does not share any of these common genetic underpinnings. Several experiments use individuals with antisocial parents who have been adopted and raised by other people. Consistently, however, antisocial behavior prevails in the child despite the deviant, biological parents being absent. One such experiment used individuals whose biological parents exhibited criminal behavior and who were adopted. When the adoptive environment was adverse and the genetic predisposition was present, 40% of the adoptees partook in criminal activity compared to only 12.1% with only genetic predispositions. In another study, significant heritability was found for crime, but one subsequent finding was that heritability was higher in individuals from high socioeconomic background and those from rural areas. This shows the link between antisocial behavior and biological risk will be stronger in individuals from kindly social backgrounds than individuals from adverse social backgrounds "because the social causes of crime camouflage the biological contribution. While several studies have been initiated to identify the alleles responsible for antisocial behavior, no such discovery has been made thus far.

==== Minor physical anomalies and environmental interactions ====
In one study testing 129 boys from age 12 to 21 years with minor physical anomalies (MPAs), the correlation between antisocial behavior and MPAs only existed when the individual suffering from an MPA was exposed to an adverse home environment. This environment was necessary to express the biological predisposition just like an environment is necessary to express certain genes.

==== Brain activity and environmental interactions ====
A link between prefrontal cortex dysfunction and antisocial behavior has been found in many studies. Some frontal lobe lesions have been responsible for impulsivity and disinhibition, which are key characteristics of Antisocial Personality Disorder. In one such study, a group of murderers were divided into two groups: one with benign social backgrounds and one with malignant social backgrounds. Using positron emission tomography (PET) scans were used to detect function in different parts of the brain. Compared to a normal control group, the murderers raised in malignant environments had relatively good prefrontal functioning, but the murderers raised in benign environments had significantly reduced prefrontal functioning, mainly in the right hemisphere. Functional MRI scans were used in another study with violent offenders and abusive environments. Four groups were composed of non-violent controls with no history of abuse, violent offenders with a history of abuse, violent offenders with no history of abuse, and non-violent controls with a history of abuse. The violent offenders who had been abused showed reduced function in the right hemisphere, particularly the right temporal cortex. According to the authors of this article, this experiment's results imply that good right hemispheric functioning may protect against violence in abused children.

== Adolescence-limited offenders ==
Although the biological risk factor do not apply to this group, one point worth noting is that the myelination of the frontal cortex continues into our 20's. This continuing development may help to explain why antisocial behavior ceases after adolescence and why such a spike in crime exists there in the first place.

=== Cause ===
According to Terrie Moffitt, there are 3 etiological hypotheses for adolescent-limited offenders:

1. Adolescence-limited antisocial behavior is motivated by the gap between biological maturity and social maturity

2. It is learned from antisocial models who are easily mimicked

3. It is sustained according to the reinforcement principles of learning theory

== Neuroethical implications ==
This type of theory leads to several different neuroethical issues. If, in the future, we were able to use brain scans, behavioral data, or another type of screening to identify life-course-persistent offenders in childhood, what type of interventions would be implemented, if any? Would it even be ethical to use brain scans or other screening methods to preemptively test children in the first place? Assuming that the data was so reliable that there was no chance a child tested to be a life-course-persistent offender could change course throughout his/her life due to social or environmental factors, what would we do with those children? If those positively tested children were placed in a classroom together, away from other children, it is likely that their violence or aggression would simply worsen. Do we want to institute policies that "treat troubled children as future criminals?" One particular experiment compares the neural bases of antisocial behavior and morality. What if, in the future, we could identify the people who had an intact moral compass, but were biologically engineered to exhibit antisocial behavior? Would this change the course of action with these individuals, or does every antisocial individual deserve intervention despite their moral health?

== See also ==
- Italian school of criminology
- Differential K theory
- Fluctuating asymmetry
- Minor physical anomalies
