= Holt–Oram syndrome =

Genetic disorder causing malformation of the heart and upper limb bones

- Other names: Heart-hand syndrome, Atrio-digital syndrome, Atriodigital dysplasia
- Holt–Oram syndrome has an autosomal dominant pattern of inheritance.
- Specialty: Medical genetics
- Causes: Mutations in the TBX5 gene

Holt–Oram syndrome (also called atrio-digital syndrome, atriodigital dysplasia, cardiac-limb syndrome, heart-hand syndrome type 1, HOS, ventriculo-radial syndrome) is an autosomal dominant disorder that affects bones in the arms and hands (the upper limbs) and often causes heart problems. The syndrome may include an absent radial bone in the forearm, an atrial septal defect in the heart, or heart block. It affects approximately 1 in 100,000 people.

== Presentation ==
All people with Holt–Oram syndrome have at least one abnormal wrist bone, which can often only be detected by X-ray. Other bone abnormalities are associated with the syndrome. These vary widely in severity, and include a missing thumb, a thumb that looks like a finger, upper arm bones of unequal length or underdeveloped, partial or complete absence of bones in the forearm, and abnormalities in the collar bone or shoulder blade. Bone abnormalities may affect only one side of the body or both sides; if both sides are affected differently, the left side is usually affected more severely.

Hands of a person with Holt–Oram syndrome after surgical reconstruction. The right is an index finger that underwent pollicization. The left hand appears to have a hypoplastic thumb that underwent web space deepening and opponensplasty to allow for functional grip and opposition.

About 75 percent of individuals with Holt–Oram syndrome also have congenital heart problems, with the most common being defects in the tissue wall between the upper chambers of the heart (atrial septal defect) or the lower chambers of the heart (ventricular septal defect). People with Holt–Oram syndrome may also have abnormalities in the electrical system that coordinates contractions of the heart chambers. Cardiac conduction disease can lead to slow heart rate (bradycardia); rapid, ineffective contraction of the heart muscles (fibrillation); and heart block. People with Holt–Oram syndrome may have only congenital heart defects, only cardiac conduction disease, both or neither.

== Genetics ==
Mutations in the TBX5 gene cause Holt–Oram syndrome. The TBX5 gene produces a protein that is critical for the proper development of the heart and upper limbs before birth.

Holt–Oram syndrome has an autosomal dominant pattern of inheritance, meaning one abnormal copy of the gene is sufficient to cause disease, which each child has a 50% chance of inheriting from an affected parent. However, in 85% of cases, the gene mutation isn't inherited, but a new mutation.

== Diagnosis ==
Diagnosis may be made on physical features alone, if a person has an arm or hand bone abnormality and a personal or family history of heart problems. If the symptoms are not enough to diagnose, a person may undergo genetic testing for the mutations associated with the syndrome.

== Treatment ==
A person with Holt–Oram syndrome may need various treatments, depending on how the syndrome manifests. Surgery, prosthetics and physical or occupational therapy can help people with bone abnormalities. Heart defects may call for surgery, medication, pacemakers or close monitoring. Pregnant women with Holt–Oram syndrome and heart abnormalities should be followed by a cardiologist during pregnancy.

== History ==
It is named for Mary Holt and Samuel Oram, who published a paper on it in 1960.

== See also ==
- Absent radius
- Heart-hand syndromes
