= Biemond syndrome =

- Other names: Brachydactyly–nystagmus–cerebellar ataxia syndrome

Biemond syndrome is a genetic disorder characterised by brachydactyly, nystagmus, strabismus, cerebellar ataxia and intellectual disability.

== Signs and symptoms ==
The family described by Biemond had a few members across four generations who had brachydactyly (due to one short metacarpal and metatarsal), nystagmus, strabismus, cerebellar ataxia and intellectual disability. Some of the members did not have the full syndrome.

== History ==
It was first described in 1934 by Dutch neurologist Arie Biemond (1902–1973). It has not been described since.
