= Heart-hand syndrome, Spanish type =

- Other names: Heart hand syndrome type 3 (or III), brachydactyly and intraventricular conduction defect, upper limb malformations and congenital cardiac anomalies.
- Specialty: Medical genetics
- Symptoms: Heart and hand anomalies
- Usual onset: Conception
- Duration: Life-long
- Types: This is a type of heart hand syndrome, and doesn't have any subtypes itself.
- Causes: Autosomal dominant inheritance
- Diagnostic method: Physical examination, Radiography
- Prevention: none
- Prognosis: Ok
- Frequency: very rare, only 1 family has ever been recorded in medical literature
- Deaths: -

Heart-hand syndrome, Spanish type, also known as heart-hand syndrome type 3 or III, is a very rare genetic disorder which is characterized by heart, hand, and sometimes feet abnormalities. It is a type of heart-hand syndrome, a class of genetic disorders characterized by cardiac malformations and hand malformations. Only one family with the disorder has been reported in medical literature.

== Description ==
People with this disorder have symptoms that affect the heart, hands and feet. These include:

=== Heart ===
- Sick sinus
- Bundle branch block

=== Hands ===
- Brachydactyly which resembles brachydactyly type C
- Abnormal development of the middle phalanges of the fingers
- Accessory ossicle on the proximal phalange of the index finger.

=== Feet ===
- Subtle feet anomalies such as syndactyly

== Etymology ==
This condition was first discovered by Ruiz de la Fuente et al., when they described a three-generation family from Spain with the symptoms mentioned above. The cardiac defects varied between family members; three members had intraventicular conduction defects and one had a sick sinus. In this family, the second and fifth fingers were the most severely affected out of all the fingers. Autosomal dominant inheritance was suspected.
