= Brachydactyly-preaxial hallux varus syndrome =

- Other names: Christian brachydactyly
- Radiographs and pictures of the hands and feet of individuals with Brachydactyly-preaxial hallux varus syndrome.
- Specialty: Medical genetics
- Symptoms: Minor physical anomalies alongside intellectual disability
- Diagnostic method: Physical examination, radiography
- Prevention: none
- Prognosis: Good
- Frequency: 10 cases
- Deaths: -

Brachydactyly-preaxial hallux varus syndrome, also known as 'Christian brachydactyly, is a rare congenital and genetic limb malformation syndrome which is characterized by hallux varus, brachydactyly type D and Morton's toe, alongside the adduction of said digits. Intellectual disabilities have also been reported. 10 cases have been described in medical literature.
