= HOXD13 =

Protein

Identifiers
- Aliases: HOXD13, BDE, BDSD, HOX4I, SPD, SPD1, homeobox D13
- External IDs: OMIM: 142989; MGI: 96205; GeneCards: HOXD13

Gene location (Human)
Chr.	Chromosome 2 (human)
Band	2q31.1	Start	176,092,721 bp
Band	2q31.1	End	176,095,944 bp

Gene location (Mouse)
Chr.	Chromosome 2 (mouse)
Band	2 C3|2 44.13 cM	Start	74,498,654 bp
Band	2 C3|2 44.13 cM	End	74,501,943 bp
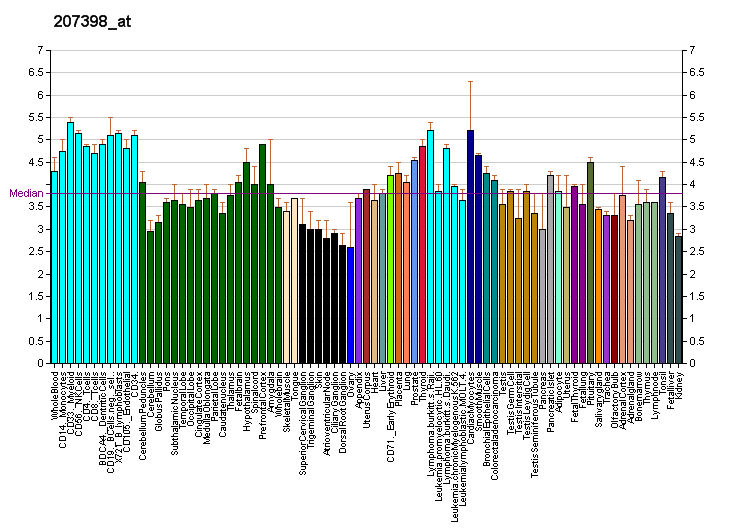

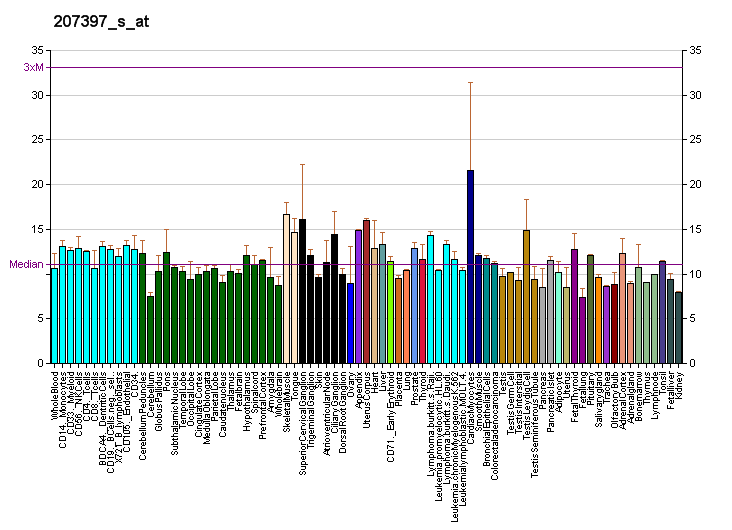
RNA expression pattern
Bgee	Human / Mouse (ortholog); Top expressed in: urethra; vagina; muscle layer of sigmoid colon; ectocervix; Achilles tendon; seminal vesicula; prostate; canal of the cervix; vulva; rectum / Top expressed in: genital tubercle; left colon; hand; tail of embryo; limb bud; rectum; foot; vas deferens; urethra; footplate; More reference expression data
BioGPS	More reference expression data
Gene ontology
Molecular function	DNA binding; sequence-specific DNA binding; DNA-binding transcription activator activity, RNA polymerase II-specific; chromatin binding; RNA polymerase II cis-regulatory region sequence-specific DNA binding; DNA-binding transcription factor activity, RNA polymerase II-specific; cis-regulatory region sequence-specific DNA binding; DNA-binding transcription factor activity; sequence-specific double-stranded DNA binding
Cellular component	nucleus
Biological process	pattern specification process; skeletal system development; regulation of branching involved in prostate gland morphogenesis; male genitalia development; regulation of transcription, DNA-templated; limb morphogenesis; embryonic digit morphogenesis; embryonic hindgut morphogenesis; branch elongation of an epithelium; transcription, DNA-templated; multicellular organism development; gland morphogenesis; regulation of cell population proliferation; embryonic limb morphogenesis; prostate epithelial cord arborization involved in prostate glandular acinus morphogenesis; anterior/posterior pattern specification; morphogenesis of an epithelial fold; transcription by RNA polymerase II; prostate gland development; response to testosterone; positive regulation of transcription by RNA polymerase II
Sources:Amigo / QuickGO
Orthologs
Databases	NCBI: entry; OMA: entry
Species	Human	Mouse
Entrez	3239	15433
Ensembl	ENSG00000128714	ENSMUSG00000001819
UniProt	P35453	P70217
RefSeq (mRNA)	NM_000523	NM_008275
RefSeq (protein)	NP_000514	NP_032301
Location (UCSC)	Chr 2: 176.09 – 176.1 Mb	Chr 2: 74.5 – 74.5 Mb
PubMed search
- Wikidata
View/Edit Human	View/Edit Mouse

Homeobox protein Hox-D13 is a protein that in humans is encoded by the HOXD13 gene. This gene belongs to the homeobox family of genes. The homeobox genes encode a highly conserved family of transcription factors that play an important role in morphogenesis in all multicellular organisms.

Mammals possess four similar homeobox gene clusters, HOXA, HOXB, HOXC and HOXD, located on different chromosomes, consisting of 9–11 genes arranged in tandem. HOXD13 is the first of several HOXD genes located in a cluster on chromosome 2. Deletions that remove the entire HOXD gene cluster or the 5' end of this cluster have been associated with severe limb and genital abnormalities. The product of the mouse Hoxd13 gene plays a role in axial skeleton development and forelimb morphogenesis.

Changes in the expression of the Hoxd13 gene in early lobe-finned fish may have also contributed to the evolution of the tetrapod limb. Experiments investigating the impact of 5′ Hoxd overexpression in zebrafish embryos observed modified development of distal fin structures, resulting in increased proliferation, distal expansion of cartilage tissue and fin fold reduction. A number of similar studies conducted with a range of animals, including catsharks and marsupials, lend further credibility to the role of the Hoxd13 gene in the fin-to-limb transition.

== Clinical significance ==
Mutations in HOXD13 can cause several types of autosomal dominant syndactyly and brachydactyly, including brachydactyly type D ("club thumb"), brachydactyly type E, syndactyly type 5 and synpolydactyly type 1.

== See also ==
- Homeobox
