= FAT4 =

Protein-coding gene in the species Homo sapiens

Identifiers
- Aliases: FAT4, CDHF14, CDHR11, FAT-J, FATJ, NBLA00548, VMLDS2, HKLLS2, FAT atypical cadherin 4
- External IDs: OMIM: 612411; MGI: 3045256; GeneCards: FAT4

Gene location (Human)
Chr.	Chromosome 4 (human)
Band	4q28.1	Start	125,314,918 bp
Band	4q28.1	End	125,492,932 bp

Gene location (Mouse)
Chr.	Chromosome 3 (mouse)
Band	3|3 B	Start	38,941,089 bp
Band	3|3 B	End	39,066,134 bp
RNA expression pattern
Bgee	Human / Mouse (ortholog); Top expressed in: Achilles tendon; stromal cell of endometrium; periodontal fiber; epithelium of colon; mucosa of paranasal sinus; Descending thoracic aorta; popliteal artery; tibial arteries; ventricular zone; tibia / Top expressed in: hand; internal carotid artery; external carotid artery; Gonadal ridge; dermis; vas deferens; conjunctival fornix; human fetus; ascending aorta; condyle; More reference expression data
BioGPS	n/a
Gene ontology
Molecular function	protein binding; calcium ion binding
Cellular component	integral component of membrane; apical part of cell; membrane; intracellular anatomical structure; plasma membrane; extracellular exosome
Biological process	cerebral cortex development; heterophilic cell-cell adhesion via plasma membrane cell adhesion molecules; homophilic cell adhesion via plasma membrane adhesion molecules; neurogenesis; heart morphogenesis; regulation of metanephric nephron tubule epithelial cell differentiation; kidney development; plasma membrane organization; digestive tract development; inner ear receptor cell stereocilium organization; ossification involved in bone maturation; hippo signaling; branching involved in ureteric bud morphogenesis; cell adhesion; nephron development; fibroblast growth factor receptor signaling pathway; Notch signaling pathway; condensed mesenchymal cell proliferation; cell-cell adhesion
Sources:Amigo / QuickGO
Orthologs
Databases	NCBI: entry; OMA: entry
Species	Human	Mouse
Entrez	79633	329628
Ensembl	ENSG00000196159	ENSMUSG00000046743
UniProt	Q6V0I7	Q2PZL6
RefSeq (mRNA)	NM_001291285; NM_001291303; NM_024582	NM_183221
RefSeq (protein)	NP_001278214; NP_001278232; NP_078858; NP_001278214.1; NP_001278232.1	NP_899044
Location (UCSC)	Chr 4: 125.31 – 125.49 Mb	Chr 3: 38.94 – 39.07 Mb
PubMed search
- Wikidata
View/Edit Human	View/Edit Mouse

Protocadherin Fat 4, also known as cadherin family member 14 (CDHF14) or FAT tumor suppressor homolog 4 (FAT4), is a protein that in humans is encoded by the FAT4 gene.

FAT4 is associated with the Hippo signaling pathway.

== Clinical significance ==
Mutations in FAT4 are associated to Hennekam syndrome and Van Maldergem syndrome.
