= Bladder and prostate diseases =

Diseases of the bladder and prostate are common health conditions that affect many individuals. Some disorders can cause morbidity and even mortality. Whilst bladder diseases can affect both sexes, prostate diseases are limited to those individuals with male anatomy.

== Bladder diseases ==
The bladder is an organ that stores urine until it is released from the body. Several conditions can affect the bladder including urinary tract infections, bladder stones, bladder cancer, overactive bladder, cystitis, interstitial cystitis, abscess, fistula, and urinary incontinence.

Bladder diseases are commonly diagnosed through testing requested by a medical professional. These may include urine tests, biopsy, cystoscopy, x-ray, pelvic ultrasound, blood tests or surgical intervention.

== Prostate diseases ==
The prostate is a gland that is deep within the pelvic cavity of those with male anatomy. It is responsible for producing fluid that helps with sperm movement. Due to its location within the body, when diseased, it can affect the reproductive and urinary systems. Prostate diseases, such as prostatitis, benign prostatic hyperplasia (BPH), and prostate cancer all affect the functioning of this gland.

== Treatment options ==
Treatments for bladder and prostate diseases depend on numerous factors including the specific condition diagnosed, the severity of the condition, and other individual characteristics. Treatments may be used in isolation or in combination with other treatments.

Both complementary and alternative therapies can be used to treat urological and prostatic disorders.
