= Hypertension and brachydactyly syndrome =

- Other names: Brachydactyly-arterial hypertension syndrome
- This condition is inherited in an autosomal dominant manner.

Hypertension and brachydactyly syndrome (HTNB), also known as Bilginturan syndrome and brachydactyly type E among others, is a very rare genetic disorder.

It was first reported in 1973 by N. Bilginturan et al. The estimated prevalence is less than 1 out of 1,000,000.

== Symptoms ==
The disorder is characterized by:

- severe salt-independent but age-dependent hypertension
- brachydactyly malformations of the hands and fingers
- increased fibroblast growth rate
- neurovascular contact at the rostral-ventrolateral medulla
- altered baroreflex blood pressure regulation
- death from stroke before age 50 years when untreated

== Genetics ==
The disorder is thought to be related to mutations in the PDE3A gene.
