= Blood vessel disorder =

Medical condition characterized by narrow, hardened, enlarged arteries and veins

Blood vessel disorder generally refers to the narrowing, hardening or enlargement of arteries and veins. It is often due to the build-up of fatty deposits in the lumen of blood vessels or infection of the vessel wall. This can occur in various locations such as coronary blood vessels, peripheral arteries and veins. The narrowed arteries would block the blood supply to different organs and tissues. In severe conditions, it may develop into more critical health problems like myocardial infarction, stroke or heart failure, which are some of the major reasons of death.

There are many causes contributing to blood vessel disorder including high blood cholesterol and calcium levels, blood clot formation and inflammation of arteries. It is found that age, sedentary lifestyle, diets rich in lipids, smoking, diabetes and family history of cardiovascular diseases are common risk factors. A mild degree of blood vessel disorder may be asymptomatic. Blood tests on cholesterol and calcium level can be performed to monitor the risk of having the disorder. Additionally, techniques such as angiography and ultrasound imaging are useful tools for diagnosis. It can be treated by both medication or surgery, depending on the type of blood vessel disorder.

== Types of Blood Vessel Disorder ==
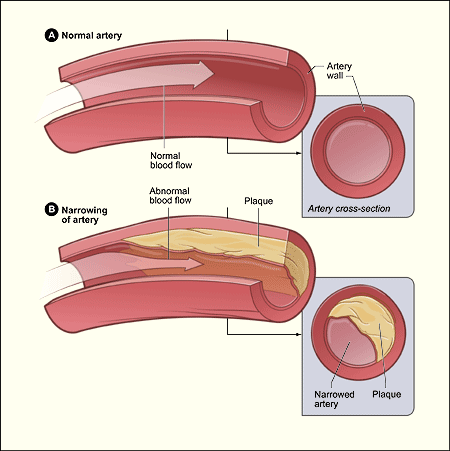
Atherosclerosis: narrowing of the artery

=== Atherosclerosis ===
Atherosclerosis is a developmental disease in the large arteries, defined by the accumulation of lipids, macrophages and fibrous materials in the intima. When the endothelial cell of blood vessel is damaged, it loses the ability to regulate itself. It results in inflammation as the macrophages irrupt the vessel wall. Macrophages take up lipoprotein to form foam cells and release growth factor cytokines to attract more macrophages and smooth muscle cells. A plaque is formed and proliferate to a larger size, gradually occluding the blood flow. More importantly, it causes different complications that affect the whole body.

=== Aneurysm ===
An aneurysm is a localized enlargement of arteries, characterized by a balloon-like bulge. It results from the abnormal weakening of blood vessel wall. Common types of aneurysm include abdominal aortic aneurysm, thoracic aortic aneurysm and intracranial aneurysm. Most types of aneurysm, except intracranial aneurysm, are mainly caused by atherosclerosis.

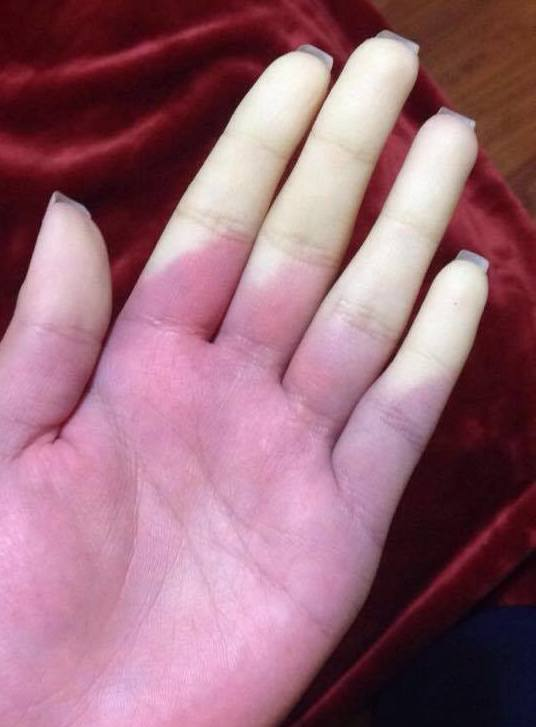
Symptoms of Raynaud's disease

=== Raynaud's Disease ===
Raynaud's disease is a rare peripheral vascular syndrome that narrows blood vessels, generally in the hands and feet, due to cold or stressful emotion. It is recognized by the reduction of blood flow to fingers and toes with periodic spasm and results in a drastic color change to white or blue. The disease may further develop into ischaemic pain and necrosis of fingers or toes. The pathology of Raynaud's disease starts with the activation of sympathetic nervous system triggered by cold or the feeling of stress.

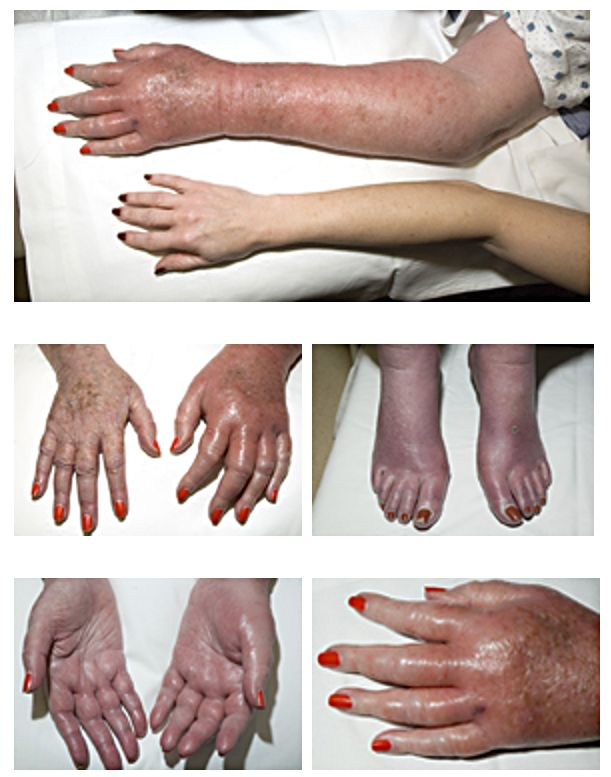
Symptoms of erythromelalgia

=== Venous thromboembolism ===
Venous thromboembolism (VTE) is a common peripheral venous disease. It is defined by the occlusion of venous blood vessels by blood clots. There are two major types of VTE: deep-vein thrombosis (DVT) and pulmonary embolism. DVT is often found in the calf, accompanies with the swelling of limbs along the deep vein while pulmonary embolism causes chronic pulmonary hypertension. VTE is the third deadliest cardiovascular disease in the world. Haemostasis is the rapid development of blood clots for the purpose of reducing blood loss. On the contrary, venous clots are formed much slower, in terms of several days or even weeks. Abnormality of coagulation during haemostasis, change in blood flow and endothelial failure may trigger VTE.

=== Erythromelalgia ===
Erythromelalgia is a rare clinical disorder causing redness, burning sensation and intense pain in limbs. It is more common to be found in lower limbs than upper limbs. Erythromelalgia initiated from dysfunction of peripheral nerves that thickens the blood vessel walls, resulting in hyperaemic flow in limbs.

=== Stroke ===
Stroke is a serious condition of blood vessel disorder caused by the stop of blood supply to the brain. Brain cells with ceased oxygen supply from blood will die in millions per second. Not only is it one of the major causes of death around the world, it is also the cause of permanent disability. Two major types of stroke include ischemic stroke which is caused by atherosclerosis in the brain and hemorrhagic stroke which is the bleeding in the brain due to weakened blood vessel wall inside the brain.

== Signs and symptoms ==
It is often asymptomatic in the early stages of blood vessel disorder. When the disease develops, a variety of signs can be observed in different body parts. For instance, patients may have pale skin, cold hands and feet, and numb fingertips. These are mainly due to the reduction in blood flow to the limbs, resulting in a decrease in heat distribution to these areas. Ulcers and wounds would also take a much longer time to heal because of the impairment in blood clot formation process. Muscle weakness and cramping may occur as well, especially in the legs, because of the insufficient oxygen supply to muscle cells for metabolism.

=== Complications ===
The vascular system plays a central role in cardiovascular function and overall physiology by transporting oxygen, nutrients, and hormones to tissues and removing metabolic waste products. Because of this essential role, disorders of the blood vessels can affect multiple organ systems and may lead to serious systemic complications, including cardiovascular and metabolic consequences.

Coronary arteries supply oxygenated blood to the heart muscle. Disorders affecting these vessels, particularly atherosclerosis, can narrow or obstruct the arterial lumen and reduce blood flow to the myocardium, resulting in myocardial ischemia. Prolonged or severe ischemia may impair cardiac function and, in some cases, lead to heart failure. In addition, rupture of an atherosclerotic plaque can trigger the formation of a thrombus, causing acute blockage of a coronary artery and resulting in myocardial infarction (heart attack).

== Risk factors ==
Various factors may affect one's susceptibility to blood vessel disorders, including behavioural (e.g. smoking), demographic (e.g. age) and genetic (family history) factors. Most of these risk factors first promote the increase in blood pressure, followed by other symptoms and signs.

=== Age ===
The rise of blood pressure is correlated to ageing. The arterial compliance - the amount of tension produced per stretch of arteries, decreases with age, and the stiffness of arteries increases with age. The structural change in blood vessels causes the elderly to be more susceptible to hypertension, which leads to complications in arteries, the heart and even the brain.

=== Obesity ===
Having obesity would increase the risk of atherosclerosis. A high-fat and high-cholesterol diet would result in an elevation of lipoprotein level, which is one of the constituents of plaque. Lipoprotein level above > 25–30 mg/dl is considered more susceptible by blood vessel disorders.

=== Family history ===
Some of the blood vessel disorders are inherited. For instance, erythromelalgia is caused by the mutation of the SCN9A gene, which alters the neural pathway to blood vessels. Genetic disorders that affect the circulatory, immune or neural system may contribute to hereditary blood vessel disorder. If one's family history shows records of vascular disorders, it is more likely to inherit the same disease.Some blood vessel disorders have a hereditary component and may occur more frequently in individuals with a family history of vascular disease. Genetic factors can contribute to susceptibility to a variety of vascular conditions, either directly through inherited vascular disorders or indirectly through inherited risk factors for cardiovascular disease.

=== Smoking ===
Both active or passive smoking may bring harm to the vascular system. For instance, cigarette smoking, cannabinoids and smokeless tobacco use were all found to raise blood pressure and increase the risk of stroke. Moreover, cigar and cigarette smoking may also cause arterial stiffness.

=== Medication ===
Some medications may have the side effect of increasing blood pressure and may even suppress the effect of anti-inflammatory drugs. Pain and anti-inflammatory drugs like Indomethacin, nonsteroidal anti-inflammatory drugs and piroxicam would retain water in the systemic circulation, raising the blood pressure. Other types of medications like antidepressant, hormone and caffeine would also increase blood pressure.Certain medications and substances, including some antidepressants, hormonal therapies, and caffeine, may contribute to elevated blood pressure in susceptible individuals.

== Diagnosis ==
Diagnosis of blood vessel disorders typically begins with a physical examination. Findings may include diminished or absent pulses distal to an arterial narrowing, reduced blood pressure in the affected limb, and vascular bruits detected by auscultation. Additional diagnostic tests may then be used to identify the location and severity of vascular narrowing, obstruction, or enlargement.

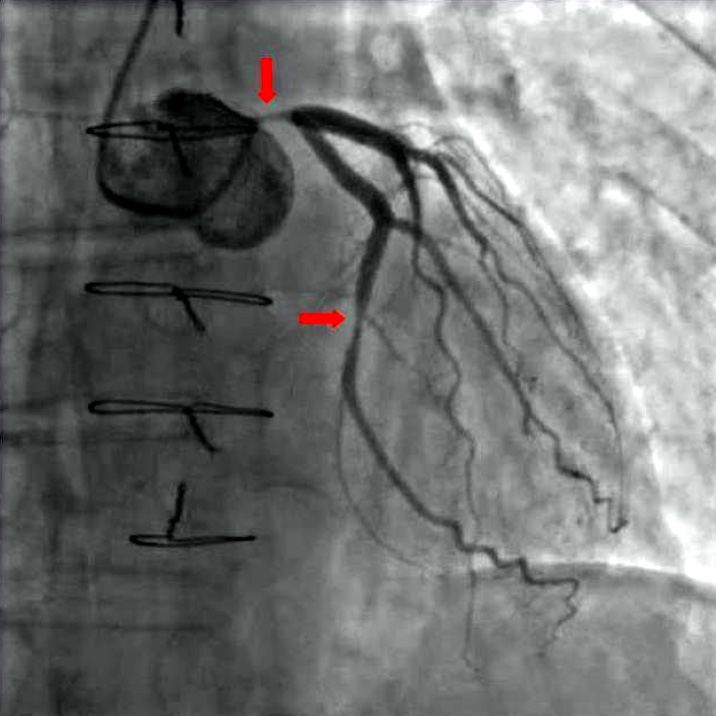
Angiography showing blockade of coronary artery

=== Angiography ===
Angiography is a medical imaging technique used to visualize the lumen of blood vessels. A catheter, which is a long and thin tube, is inserted into a large artery in the arm or groin area. It is then guided along the artery to the targeted blood vessel to be examined. An imaging dye is loaded into the blood vessel through the catheter and the movement of the dye in the blood vessel is recorded as an angiogram. Doctors could determine if there are any abnormalities in the blood vessel using fluoroscopy, computed tomography (CT) angiography or magnetic resonance (MR) angiography. After the catheter is removed, some pressure is applied to the incision site for 10 to 20 minutes to prevent excessive bleeding.

=== Vascular ultrasound ===
Vascular ultrasound is a non-invasive imaging method to examine the circulation inside blood vessels. Sound waves are transmitted through the tissues of the targeted area and they reflect on the blood cells moving within blood vessels. The waves recorded are displayed as an image of the blood vessel and the speed of waves detected can be used to calculate the speed of blood flow inside the vessel. When the rate of blood flow is too low, there may be a blockage of vessel. By evaluating blood flow in vessels, the severity and specific location of blood vessel disorder can be determined.

== Treatments ==
Different kinds of treatment should be adopted according to the type and severity of blood vessel disorder. Medications are usually prescribed to relieve specific symptoms arisen from the disease while surgery like angioplasty can be performed to provide a more long-lasting effect.Different treatment approaches may be used depending on the type and severity of the vascular disorder. Management may include medications to control symptoms and reduce disease progression, as well as endovascular or surgical procedures to restore or improve blood flow when indicated.

=== Surgery ===
Angioplasty is a procedure used to widen narrowed blood vessels, especially in coronary arteries. A long and thin tube called catheter is inserted into a large artery through an incision in the wrist, arm or groin area. The catheter is guided to the affected artery using a real-time x-ray video. A thin wire is then introduced into the blood vessel, delivering a small balloon to the affected area. The balloon is inflated to stretch the blood vessel and compress the fatty deposits against the wall of artery. Hence, the vessel is widened and blood can flow through it freely to maintain adequate blood supply to different tissues. Finally, the balloon is deflated and removed. A stent may also be placed to provide support to the vessel wall and prevent it from re-narrowing.

=== Medications ===
Beta blockers are medications that inhibit the effects of the sympathetic nervous system by blocking beta-adrenergic receptors. They are commonly used to reduce heart rate and blood pressure and to decrease cardiac workload. Some beta blockers, such as carvedilol, also possess vasodilatory properties. Examples of beta blockers include carvedilol, metoprolol, and bisoprolol.

Calcium channel blockers are medications that prevent the movement of calcium ions across calcium channels. They can be used to relieve hypertension by causing vascular smooth muscle relaxation. They also reduce the heart rate and contractility to lower the cardiac output, which in turn lower blood pressure. Amlodipine, hydralazine and dihydropyridine are examples of calcium channel blockers.

Other medications such as angiotensin-converting enzyme (ACE) inhibitors and diuretics can be used to relieve hypertension. Statins and fibrates can also be prescribed to lower blood cholesterol level and hence reducing the risk of plaque formation in blood vessels. Anti-platelet medications e.g. aspirin help reducing blood clot formation in vessels as well.
