= Fluctuating asymmetry =

Form of biological asymmetry

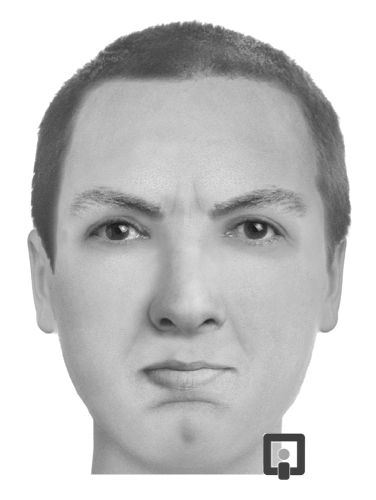
Bilateral features in the face and body, such as left and right eyes, ears, lips, wrists and thighs, often show some extent of fluctuating asymmetry. Some individuals show greater asymmetry than others.

Fluctuating asymmetry (FA), is a form of biological asymmetry, along with anti-symmetry and direction asymmetry. Fluctuating asymmetry refers to small, random deviations away from perfect bilateral symmetry. This deviation from perfection is thought to reflect the genetic and environmental pressures experienced throughout development, with greater pressures resulting in higher levels of asymmetry. Examples of FA in the human body include unequal sizes (asymmetry) of bilateral features in the face and body, such as left and right eyes, ears, wrists, breasts, testicles, and thighs.

Research has exposed multiple factors that are associated with FA. As measuring FA can indicate developmental stability, it can also suggest the genetic fitness of an individual. This can further have an effect on mate attraction and sexual selection, as less asymmetry reflects greater developmental stability and subsequent fitness. Human physical health is also associated with FA. For example, young men with greater FA report more medical conditions than those with lower levels of FA. Multiple other factors can be linked to FA, such as intelligence and personality traits.

== Measurement ==
Fluctuating asymmetry (FA) can be measured by the equation: Mean FA = mean absolute value of left sides - mean absolute value of right sides.

The closer the mean value is to zero, the lower the levels of FA, indicating more symmetrical features. By taking many measurements of multiple traits per individual, this increases the accuracy in determining that individual's developmental stability. However, these traits must be chosen carefully, as different traits are affected by different selection pressures.

This equation can further be used to study the distribution of asymmetries at population levels, to distinguish between traits that show FA, directional asymmetry, and anti-symmetry. The distribution of FA around a mean point of zero suggests that FA is not an adaptive trait, where symmetry is ideal. Directional asymmetry of traits can be distinguished by showing significantly biased measurements towards traits being larger on either the left or right sides, for example, human testicles (where the right is more commonly larger), or handedness (85% are right handed, 15% are left handed). Anti-symmetry can be distinguished by the bimodal distributions, due to some adaptive functions.

== Causes ==
Fluctuating asymmetry (FA) is often considered to be the product of developmental stress and instability, caused by both genetic and environmental stressors. The notion that FA is a result of genetic and environmental factors is supported by Waddington's notion of canalisation, which implies that FA is a measure of the genome's ability to successfully buffer development to achieve a normal phenotype under imperfect environmental conditions. Various factors causing developmental instability and FA include infections, mutations, and toxins.

=== Genetic factors ===
Research on twins suggests that there are genetic influences on FA, and increased levels of mutations and perturbations is also linked to greater asymmetry.

FA may also result from a lack of genetic immunity to diseases, as those with higher FA show less effective immune responses. This is further supported by evidence showing an association between FA and the number of respiratory infections experienced by an individual, such that those with higher levels of FA experience more infections. Increased prevalence of parasites and diseases in an organism is also seen more in individuals with greater levels of FA. However, the research in this field is predominantly correlational, so caution must be taken when inferring causation. For example, rather than a lack of immunity causing FA, FA may weaken the immune responses of an organism, or there may be another factor involved.

There is some speculation that inbreeding contributes towards FA. One study on ants demonstrated that, although inbred individuals show more asymmetry in observed bilateral traits, the differences were not significant. Furthermore, ant colonies created by an inbreeding queen do not show significantly higher FA than those produced by a non-inbreeding queen.

=== Environmental factors ===
Multiple sources provide information on environmental factors that are correlated with FA. A meta-analysis of related studies suggests that FA is an appropriate marker of environmental stress during development.

Some evidence suggests that poverty and lack of food during development may contribute to greater levels of FA. Infectious diseases can also lead to FA, as studies have repeatedly shown that those with higher FA report more infections. Alternatively, this association between levels of FA and infections may be due to a lack of immunity to diseases, as mentioned earlier (see 'Genetic factors'). Fluctuating asymmetry in human males is also seen to positively correlate with levels of oxidative stress. This process occurs when an organism creates excess reactive oxygen species (ROS) compared to ROS-neutralising antioxidants. Oxidative stress may mediate the association seen between high FA and infection amounts during development.

Toxins and poisons are considered to increase FA. Pregnancy sickness is argued to be an adaptation for avoiding toxins during foetal development. Research has reported that when a mother has no sickness or a sickness that extends beyond week 12 of gestation, the offspring shows higher FA (as demonstrated by measuring thigh circumferences). This suggests that when a mother fails to expel environmental toxins, this creates stress and developmental instability for the foetus, later leading to increased asymmetry in that individual. Greater exposure to pollution may also be a fundamental cause of FA. Research on skull characteristics of Baltic grey seals (Halichoerus grypus) demonstrated that those born after 1960 (marking an increase in environmental pollution) had increased levels of asymmetry. Also, shrews (Crocidura russula) from more polluted areas show higher levels of asymmetry. Radioactive contamination may also increase FA levels, as mice (Apodemus flavicollis) living closer to the failed Chernobyl reactor show greater asymmetry.

== Developmental stability ==
Developmental stability is achieved when an organism is able to withstand genetic and environmental stress, to display the bilaterally symmetrical traits determined by its developmentally programmed phenotype. To measure an individual's developmental stability, the FA measurements of 10 traits are added together, including ear width, elbows, ankles, wrists, feet, length of ears and fingers. This is achieved by: (L - R)trait 1 + (L - R)trait 2 + ......(L - R)trait 10. This provides a good overall measure of body FA, as every individual has some features that are not perfectly symmetrical.

Common environmental pressures leading to lower developmental stability include exposure to toxins, poison and infectious diseases, low food quality and malnutrition. Genetic pressures include spontaneous new mutations, and "bad genes" (genes that once had adaptive functions, but are being removed through evolutionary selection). A large fluctuating asymmetry (FA) and a low developmental stability suggests that an organism is unable to develop according to the ideal state of bilateral symmetry. The energy required for bilateral symmetry development is extremely high, making fully perfect bilateral symmetry functionally nonexistent in natural organic creatures. Energy is invested into survival in spite of the genetic and environmental pressures, before making bilaterally symmetrical traits. Research has also revealed links between FA and depression, genetic or environmental stress and measures of mate quality for sexual selection.

== Health ==
=== Susceptibility to diseases ===
Research has linked higher levels of fluctuating asymmetry (FA) to poorer outcomes in some domains of physical health in humans. For example, one study found that individuals with higher levels of FA report a higher number of medical conditions than those with lower levels of FA. However, they did not experience worse outcomes in areas such as systolic blood pressure or cholesterol levels. Higher levels of FA have also been linked to higher body mass index (BMI) in women, and lower BMI in men. Research has shown that both men and women with higher levels of FA, both facial and bodily, report a higher number of respiratory infections and a higher number of days ill, compared to men and women with lower levels of FA. In men, higher levels of FA have been linked to lower levels of physical attractiveness and higher levels of oxidative stress, regardless of smoking or levels of toxin exposure. There is no gender difference in the susceptibility of diseases depending on body FA.

A large-scale review of the human and non-human literature by Møller found that higher levels of fluctuating asymmetry were linked to increased vulnerability to parasites, and also to lower levels of immunity to disease. A large-scale longitudinal study in Britain found that facial FA was not associated with poorer health over the course of childhood, which was interpreted as suggesting smaller effects of FA in Western societies with generally low levels of FA. A review of the relationship between various attractiveness features and health in Western societies produced similar results, finding that symmetry was not related to health in either sex, but was related to attractiveness in males.

=== Health-risk behaviours ===
It has been suggested that individuals with lower levels of FA may engage in more biologically costly behaviours such as recreational drug use and risky body modifications such as piercings and tattoos. These ideas have been proposed in the context of Zahavi's handicap principle, which argues that highly costly behaviours or traits serve as signals of an organism's genetic quality. The relationship between FA and behaviours with high health risks has received mixed support. Individuals with body piercings and tattoos (which increase risk of blood-borne infections) have been shown to have lower levels of FA, but individuals with lower FA do not engage in any more recreational drug use than those with higher FA levels.

=== Mental health in humans ===
Higher levels of FA have been linked to higher levels of some mental health difficulties. For instance, it has been shown that, among university students, higher FA is associated with higher levels of schizotypy. Depression scores have been found to be higher in men, but not women, with higher levels of FA. One study by Shackelford and Larsen found that men and women with higher facial asymmetry reported more physiological complaints than those with lower facial asymmetry, and that both men and women with higher asymmetry experienced higher levels of psychological distress overall. For example, men with higher facial asymmetry experienced higher levels of depression compared to men with lower facial asymmetry. Fluctuating asymmetry has also been studied in relation to psychopathy. One study looking at offenders and non-offenders found that, although offenders had higher levels of FA overall, psychopathic offenders had lower levels of FA compared to offenders who did not meet the criteria for psychopathy. Additionally, offenders with the highest levels of psychopathy were found to have similar levels of FA to non-offenders.

=== Other health issues in humans ===
Research has also linked FA to conditions such as lower back pain, although the evidence is mixed. While one study found no notable link between pelvic asymmetry and lower back pain, other studies have found pelvic asymmetry (as well as FA in other traits not directly related to pelvic function) to be higher in patients experiencing lower back pain, and higher levels of FA have also been linked to congenital spinal problems. Studies have also shown increased levels of FA of ear length in individuals with cleft lip and/or non-syndromic cleft palate syndrome.

=== Physical fitness in humans ===
In addition to general health and susceptibility to disease, research has also studied the link between FA and physical fitness. Research has found that lower levels of lower-body FA is associated with faster running speeds in Jamaican sprinters, and individuals with greater body asymmetry have been shown to move more asymmetrically while running, although do not experience higher metabolic costs than more symmetrical individuals. It has also been shown that children with lower levels of lower-body FA have faster sprinting speeds and are more willing to sprint when followed up in adulthood.

=== Health in non-human populations ===
The relationship between FA, health and susceptibility to disease has also been studied in non-human animals. For example, studies have found that higher levels of facial asymmetry are associated with poorer overall health in female rhesus macaques (Macaca mulatta), and that higher FA is also linked to more health issues in chimpanzees (Pan troglodytes).

The link between FA and health has also been investigated in non-primates. In three gazelle species (Gazella cuvieri; Gazella dama; Gazella dorcas), for instance, FA has been linked to a range of blood parameters associated with health in mammals, although the specific relevance of these blood parameters for these gazelle species was not examined. It has also been found that, among Iberian red deer (Cervus elaphus hispanicus), higher FA was slightly negatively related to both antler size and overall body mass (traits thought to indicate overall condition). Antlers more involved in fighting were found to be more symmetrical than those not involved, and antler asymmetry at reproductive age was lower than in development or at post-reproductive age.

FA and health outcomes have been examined within insect populations. For instance, it has been found that Mediterranean field crickets (Gryllus bimaculatus) with higher levels of FA in three hind-limb traits have lower encapsulation rates, but do not differ from low-FA crickets in lytic activity (both are measures of immunocompetence). While research on the relationship between FA and longevity is sparse in humans, some studies using non-human populations have suggested an association between the symmetry of an organism and its lifespan. For instance, it has been found that flies whose wing veins showed more bilateral symmetry live longer than less symmetrical flies. This difference was greatest for male flies.

== In sexual selection ==
=== Mate attraction ===
Symmetry has been shown to affect physical attractiveness. Those with lower levels of fluctuating asymmetry (FA) are often rated as more attractive. Various studies have supported this. The relationship between FA and mate attraction has been studied in both males and females. As FA reflects developmental stability and quality, it has been suggested that we prefer those as more attractive/with low FA because it signals traits such as health and intelligence.

Research has shown that the female partners of men with lower levels of FA experience a higher number of copulatory orgasms, compared to the female partners of males with higher levels of FA. Other studies have also found that the voices of men and women with low fluctuating asymmetry are rated as more attractive, suggesting that voice may be indicative of developmental stability. Research has shown attractiveness ratings of men's scent are negatively correlated with FA, but FA is unrelated to attractiveness ratings for women's scent, and women's preferences for the scent of more symmetric men appears limited to the most fertile phases of the menstrual cycle. However, research has failed to find changes in women's preferences for low FA across the menstrual cycle when assessing pictures of faces, as opposed to scents. Facial symmetry has been positively correlated with higher occurrences of mating. Also, one study used 3-D scans of male and female bodies, and showed videos of these scans to a group of individuals who rated the bodies on attractiveness. It was found that, for both males and females, lower levels of FA were associated with higher attractiveness ratings. It was also found that sex-typical joint configurations were rated as more attractive and linked to lower FA in men, but not women. Men with higher FA have been shown to have higher levels of oxidative stress and lower levels of attractiveness. Research has also provided evidence that FA is linked to extra-pair copulation, as women have been shown to prefer men with lower levels of FA as extra-pair partners. However, the literature is mixed regarding the relationship between attractiveness and FA. For example, in one study, altering images of faces to in a way that reduced asymmetry led to observers rating such faces as less, rather than more, attractive. Research by Van Dongen also found FA to be unrelated to attractiveness, physical strength and level of masculinity in both men and women.

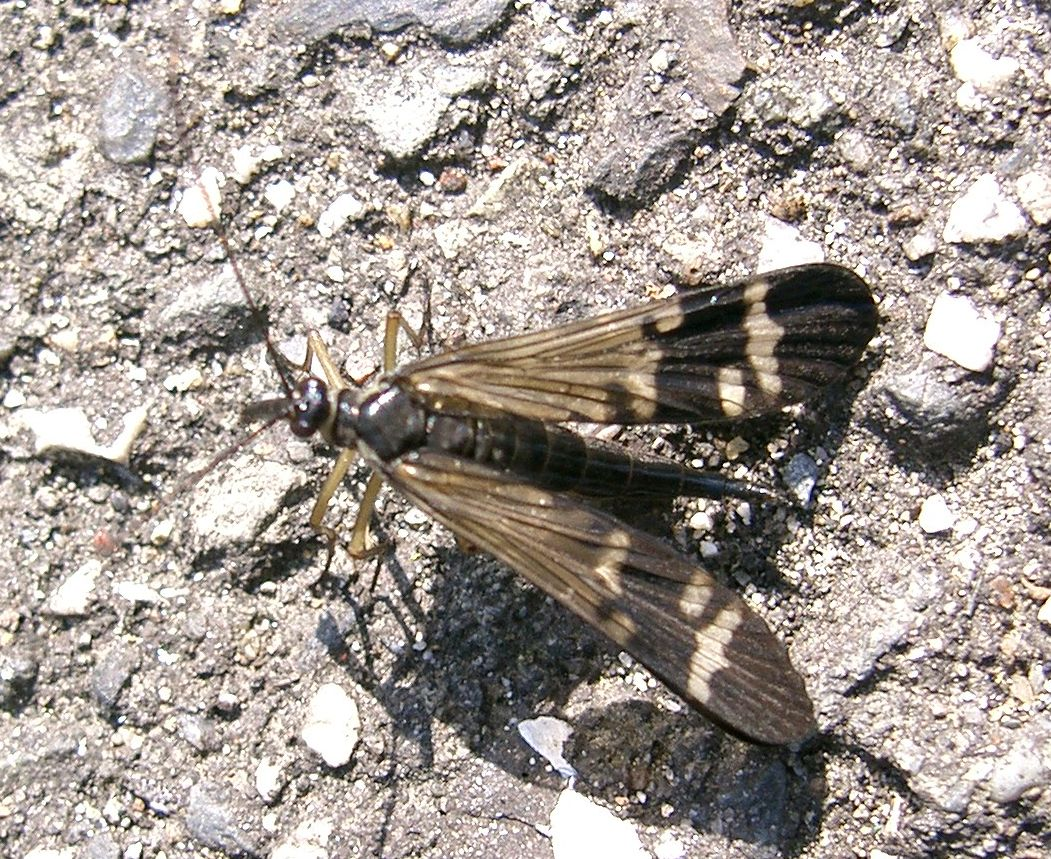
Reduced FA in Japanese scorpionflies (Panorpa japonica) is linked to fighting and mating success.

=== Sexual selection in non-human animals ===
Many non-human animals have been shown to be able to distinguish between potential partners, based upon levels of FA. As with humans, lower levels of FA are seen in the most reproductively successful members of species. For instance, FA of male forewing length seem to have an important role in successful mating for many insect species, such as dark-wing damselflies and Japanese scorpionflies. In the dark-winged damselfly (Calopteryx maculate), successfully mating male flies showed significantly lower levels of FA in their forewings than unsuccessful males, while for Japanese scorpionflies, FA levels are a good predictor for the outcome of fights between males in that more symmetrical males won significantly more fights. Other animals also show similar patterns, for example, many species of butterfly, males with lower levels of FA tended to live longer and flew more actively, allowing them to have more reproductive success. Also, female swallows have been shown to prefer longer, and more symmetrical tails as a cue for mate choice. Therefore, the males with longer and more symmetrical tails show higher levels of reproductive success with more attractive females. In red deer, sexual selection has affected antler development, in that larger and more symmetrical antlers are favoured in males at prime mating age.

However, some evidence for the effects of sexual selection of FA levels have been inconsistent, suggesting that the relationship between FA and sexual selection may be more complex than originally thought. For instance, in the lekking black grouse and red junglefowl, no correlations were found between FA and mating success. Furthermore, when manipulating paradise whydahs' tails to be more and less symmetrical, females showed no preferences for more symmetrical tails (but they did show preferences for longer tails).

== Other associated factors ==
=== Intelligence ===
Through research, fluctuating asymmetry (FA) has been found to have a negative correlation to measurements of human traits such as working memory and intelligence, such that individuals showing greater asymmetry have lower IQ scores. As FA links with both intelligence and facial attractiveness, it is possible that our perceptions of attractiveness have evolved based upon developmental quality, which includes traits such as intelligence and health. However, some literature shows no such correlations between FA and intelligence. A meta-analysis of the research covering this topic demonstrated that whilst published studies largely report negative correlations, unpublished studies often find no association between FA and intelligence.

=== Personality ===
Research into FA suggests that there may be some correlation to specific personality factors, in particular, the Big Five personality traits. From a general view, one would expect someone who is more symmetrical (usually meaning greater attractiveness), to be high on agreeableness, conscientiousness, extraversion and openness, and low on neuroticism. One of the most consistent findings reported is that low FA is positively associated with measures of extraversion, suggesting that more symmetrical people tend to be more extraverted than less symmetrical individuals, particularly when specifying to symmetry within the face. A correlation has also been reported between FA and human social dominance. However, research is proving less consistent with other personality factors, with some finding some weak correlations between low FA and conscientiousness and openness to experience, and others finding no significant differences between those with high or low FA.

=== Antisocial behaviours ===
Some studies suggest a link between FA and aggression, but the evidence is mixed. In humans, criminal offenders show greater FA than nonoffenders. However, other studies report that human males with higher FA show less physical aggression and less anger. Females show no association between FA and physical aggression, but some research has suggested that older female adolescents with higher facial FA are less hostile. The type of aggression being studied may account for the mixed evidence that is seen here. For example, one study found that females with higher FA demonstrated higher levels of reactive aggression in response to high levels of provocation, whereas high FA males showed more reactive aggression under low levels of provocation.

Research is also mixed in other animals. In Japanese scorpionflies (Panorpa nipponensis and Panorpa ochraceopennis), FA differences between members of the same sex competing for food determines the outcome of interspecific contests and aggression better than body size or ownership of food. Furthermore, cannibalistic laying hens (Gallus gallus domesticus) demonstrate more asymmetry than normal hens. However, this link between FA and aggression in hens is questionable, as victimised hens also showed greater asymmetry. Furthermore, when prenatally injecting hen eggs with excess serotonin (5-HT), the hens later exhibited more FA at 18 weeks of age, but displayed less aggressive behaviours. It is suggested that the stress introduced during early embryonic stages via certain factors (such as excess serotonin) may create developmental instability, causing phenotypic and behavioural variations (such as increased or decreased aggression).

=== Aging ===
In old age, facial symmetry has been associated with better cognitive aging, as lower levels of FA have been associated with higher intelligence and more efficient information processing in older men. However, it has been found that risk of mortality cannot be predicted accurately from levels of FA in photographs of older adults.

=== Other factors ===
Additionally, FA has been shown to predict atypical asymmetry of the brain. Research has also shown that growth rates after birth positively correlate with FA. For example, increased FA has been found in people who were obese.

== See also ==
- Bilateria
- Facial symmetry
- Physical attractiveness
- Symmetry in biology
- Minor physical anomalies
