= Hypomobility =

Musculoskeletal disorder

Hypomobility is reduced range of motion in one or more joints relative to what is considered normal. It may arise from structural, neurological, inflammatory, or functional causes, and may be temporary or chronic depending on the underlying condition. Hypomobility is commonly assessed in clinical contexts such as musculoskeletal medicine, physiotherapy, and rheumatology.

== Causes ==
Hypomobility can be caused by a variety of reasons, including:

- Stiffness in connective tissue made of high amounts of collagen
- Environmental factors such as a lack of mobility, fitness, and activity
- Lack of movement by a fetus in the womb (leading to arthrogryposis and fetal hypomobility syndrome)
- Taut (tensely pulled) soft tissue, bony obstructions, and jammed meniscoid bodies (fibrous, fatty tissues found in joints) in the spine

While environmental factors can contribute to hypomobility, it also has a genetic component. The genes that contain the instructions for making the proteins, which are used to make the connective tissue throughout the body, are passed on from parents to their offspring. If the instructions cause collagen proteins to be numerous and highly condensed, the connective tissue will be firmer. If collagen is more spread out and produced at a smaller frequency, the connective tissue will be softer. On the other hand, the protein elastin has the opposite effect on the flexibility of connective tissue, with more elastin causing the tissue to be softer and more fluid-like. The softer the connective tissue, the more innate flexibility an individual has compared to those around them with firmer connective tissue, and the opposite is true if an individual has firmer tissue.

Several issues in utero can cause hypomobility and other similar conditions to develop later on in life. The development of various skeletal disorders can lead to joint hypomobility as an infant develops. Maternal factors such as lack of vascular flow to the placenta or fetus, fetal alcohol syndrome, leaking of amniotic fluid, illness while pregnant, injuries during the first trimester of pregnancy, and taking strong medications while pregnant, such as muscle relaxants or curare, can all play a role in the infant developing hypomobility.

The most common bony cause of hypomobility in the body is the presence of degenerative osteoarthritis bone spurs at a joint margin. These bony obstructions are due to the breakdown of cartilage at various joints in the body, including the spine, hips, and knees. Because there is a lack of cartilage in the joint, the bone tries to compensate for this loss and fill the empty space with a bony mass. However, having extra bone in these locations can lead to increased stiffness and loss of mobility.

== Signs and symptoms ==
Hypomobility can have varying symptoms depending on age. While adolescents can show symptoms of hypomobility, signs and symptoms become more apparent in individuals older than 40 years. As the cartilage around their joints becomes thinner with time, these individuals have a higher risk of hypomobility. In addition, hypomobility can occur in athletes or highly active individuals when there is not sufficient recovery time.

Signs of hypomobility include:

- Limited range of motion in appendages
- Arthritis in joints
- Small, bony growths on the edges of joints
- Joint inflammation
- Thickened synovial fluid

Symptoms of hypomobility include:

- No motivation to move or carry out activities of daily living
- Joint pain while stationary or in motion
- Tenderness or tightness in muscles
- Weaker muscles
- Reduced flexibility
- Unable to balance
- Higher chance of injury

These signs and symptoms can be the determining factors for varying health conditions. However, they mainly align with hypomobility.

== Diagnosis ==
The diagnosis of hypomobility relies on evaluating the patient's history, a physical examination, and quantitative measurement of joint range of motion (ROM) in the affected areas. At this time, there is no universally accepted hypomobility syndrome classification system, and the condition is not formally recognized as a unique diagnostic item in the medical literature. Instead, clinicians describe and document hypomobility based on the degree of motion loss, the number of joints involved, and the underlying causes (when known).

During a medical history evaluation, providers record the onset and duration of symptoms. Included in this is any events such as trauma, immobilization, or surgery, and the specific activities affected by stiffness. Patients are usually asked to compare how their motion has changed over time, and to identify and characterize their movements that are now restricted or painful.

The physical examination includes comparison of active and passive ROM in the affected joints, using the contralateral limb and age (or sex-matched normative values) as reference points for measurements. According to the American Academy of Orthopaedic Surgeons (AAOS) Clinical Measurement Guidelines, restricted ROM is identified when movement is substantially below normative values. In addition to this, end-feel of motion (firm, capsular, or bony) and the presence of pain at the end of ROM are important diagnostic clues.

Measurement tools, such as goniometers and inclinometers, aid in standardized quantification of joint motion relative to normative values or ranges. Tests that follow functional movements, such as reaching overhead, squatting, or rotating the neck, are used to evaluate whether reduced ROM translates into activity limitation.

When hypomobility is regional, clinicians can use condition-specific values to compare the patient's ROM values against. For instance, in the shoulder, adhesive capsulitis (frozen shoulder) is defined by marked loss of both active and passive motion (particularly external rotation and abduction). For the knee, postoperative arthrofibrosis is typically diagnosed when extension loss exceeds 10° or flexion is limited to less than 100°, with more severe forms showing a flexion deficit of 25° or greater. In the spine, decreased ROM is assessed using values developed for ankylosing spondylitis and related disorders. The Modified Schober Test measures lumbar flexion. An increase of less than 5 cm indicates limited motion, chest expansion of 2.5 cm or less suggests thoracic restriction, and an occiput-to-wall distance greater than 2 cm shows thoracic or cervical extension limitation. The Bath Ankylosing Spondylitis Metrology Index (BASMI) provides a composite score summarizing these spinal mobility measures and is widely used to quantify skeletal hypomobility.

== Manual therapy ==
Range of motion (ROM) activities are beneficial for increasing joint mobility, reducing hypomobility. ROM activities can include stretching and staying active.

Impertinent factors, including intensity, duration, and frequency, can affect how well stretching can aid in reducing hypomobility. Intensity is defined as the joint interaction with the amount of force during an exercise. During ROM exercises, intensity needs to be a consistent substantial force. A lack of force during exercises won't improve hypomobility. Duration and frequency, pertaining to time, is important when pertaining to exercise skills. Increasing the duration or frequency of a ROM exercise will produce more results.

When heat is introduced into manual therapy, joints are more relaxed. This allows the joints to react more to the exercises performed, such as stretching. Some heating methods include just warming up before performing any exercises. This can include subtle motions or movements of the joints. Using actual heat can warm up and relax any tightness in the joints. Muscles are able to be manipulated easier, which increases effectiveness of manual therapy.

== See also ==
- Contracture
