= Boucher–Neuhäuser syndrome =

- Other names: Chorioretinal dystrophy, spinocerebellar ataxia and hypogonadotropic hypogonadism, Ataxia-hypogonadism-choroidal dystrophy syndrome.
- Specialty: Medical genetics
- Symptoms: Cerebellar ataxia, hypogonadism, and choroidal dystrophy
- Usual onset: Late childhood-adolescence-early adulthood
- Duration: Lifelong
- Causes: Genetic mutation
- Prevention: None
- Prognosis: Medium
- Frequency: very rare, only 22 cases have been described in medical literature
- Deaths: -

Boucher–Neuhäuser syndrome is a very rare genetic disorder which is characterized by a triad consisting of cerebellar ataxia, chorioretinal dystrophy, and hypogonadism.

== Signs and symptoms ==
The symptoms have already been mentioned above, this section will be used to denote the onset of these symptoms: The cerebellar ataxia associated with this syndrome often appears in adolescence-early adulthood, chorioretinal dystrophy usually appears between the age of 50 and 60 years old, and the hypogonadotropic hypogonadism appears in late childhood-adolescence.

== Causes ==
This disorder is caused by autosomal recessive mutations in the PNPLA6 gene, in chromosome 19.

== Epidemiology ==
Only 22 cases have been described in medical literature (excluding the cases which were not first reported to be part of the syndrome, which were approximately 19 cases).
