= Boudhina–Yedes–Khiari syndrome =

- Other names: Familial syndrome combining short stature, microcephaly, mental deficiency, seizures, hearing loss, and skin lesions.
- Specialty: Medical genetics, neurology, dermatology
- Symptoms: cranial dysmorphisms, epilepsy, short stature, cutaneous lesions and intellectual disabilities
- Causes: Genetic mutation
- Prevention: none
- Frequency: very rare

Boudhina–Yedes–Khiari syndrome is a very rare neurocutaneous genetic disorder which is characterized by short stature, microcephaly, intellectual disabilities, tendency to have seizures, hearing loss and skin lesions. This disorder was first discovered in the summer of 1990 in Paris, France, by T Boudhina et al., when three sisters were described as sharing the symptoms mentioned above; these symptoms were also found to have a high prevalence within their family afterwards. The suspected mode of inheritance is autosomal recessive.
