= Cryptorchidism-arachnodactyly-intellectual disability syndrome =

Cryptorchidism-arachnodactyly-intellectual disabilities syndrome
- Specialty: Medical genetics
- Symptoms: respiratory, limb and lung abnormalities with developmental delay and intellectual disabilities
- Prevention: none
- Frequency: unknown

Cryptorchidism-arachnodactyly-intellectual disability syndrome is a rare multi-systemic genetic disorder of unknown prevalence which is characterized by psycho-motor developmental delay, severe intellectual disabilities, severe muscle hypoplasia, absence of subcutaneous fat, generalized contractures, dolichocephaly, esotropia, asymmetric ears, and high palate, kyphoscoliosis, unilateral hypoplasia of the bronchial system, recurrent respiratory tract infections, atelectasis, arachnodactyly, cryptorchidism, hypospadias, and testicular agenesis. No new cases have been reported since 1970.
