= Pashayan syndrome =

- Other names: Pashayan–Pruzansky syndrome
- This condition is inherited in an autosomal dominant manner
- Named after: Hermine Pashayan; Samuel Pruzansky

Pashayan syndrome, also known as Pashayan–Pruzansky syndrome and blepharo-naso-facial syndrome, is a rare syndrome with Mendelian autosomal dominant inheritance with variable expression. An article describing a family with this syndrome was first published in 1973 in The American Journal of Diseases of Children by Drs Hermine Pashayan, Samuel Pruzansky and Allen Putterman from Abraham Lincoln School of Medicine, University of Illinois in Chicago. Facial abnormalities characterise this syndrome as well as malformation of extremities. Specific characteristics would be a bulky, flattened nose, where the face has a mask like appearance and the ears are also malformed.

A subset of Pashayan syndrome has also been described, known as "cerebrofacioarticular syndrome", "Van Maldergem syndrome'" or "Van Maldergem–Wetzburger–Verloes syndrome". Similar symptoms are noted in these cases as in Pashayan syndrome. It is allelic to Hennekam syndrome type 2, since both occur at the same gene
