= Microcephalic primordial dwarfism, Montreal type =

- Specialty: Medical genetics
- Causes: Genetic mutation
- Prevention: none
- Frequency: very rare

Microcephalic primordial dwarfism, Montreal type is a rare, multi-systemic genetic disorder that is characterized by cranio-facial dysmorphy, premature hair greying and balding, dry and wrinkled palms, skeletal abnormalities, cryptorchidism, premature dementia and intellectual disabilities of variable severity.

== Presentation ==
People with this disorder often show the following symptoms:

- Normal birth weight but dwarfism later in life
- Early-onset dementia
- Premature hair greying and loss
- Wrinkled palms
- Small head (microcephaly)
- Big eyes
- Narrow face
- Receding chin
- Intellectual disabilities
- Abnormally small brain
- Cryptorchidism
- Prominent nose
- Low set ears
- Earlobe hypoplasia-aplasia

== Etymology ==
This disorder was discovered in the early fall of 1970, in Montreal, Canada, when Fitch et al. described a patient with a type of bird-headed dwarfism, he described the symptoms mentioned above, some of the symptoms suggested a diagnosis of either Werner syndrome, Seckel syndrome, Hallermann-Streiff syndrome, or Noonan syndrome. However, the authors thought there were differences that distinguished this particular case from any other syndrome, suggesting it to be separated into an entity of its own (which it did). No more cases of this disorder have been reported since then (1970).
