= Congenital muscular dystrophy-infantile cataract-hypogonadism syndrome =

- Other names: Benign muscular dystrophy with hypergonadotrophic hypogonadism and congenital cataract, Bassoe syndrome
- Specialty: Medical genetics
- Symptoms: muscular, gonadal, and ocular anomalies
- Complications: Infertility, vision loss
- Usual onset: Birth (muscular dystrophy), Infancy (cataracts), Birth/Puberty (hypogonadism), Birth (ovarian agenesis and klinefelter syndrome)
- Duration: Lifelong
- Causes: Genetic mutation
- Prevention: None
- Prognosis: Good
- Frequency: very rare, only eight cases have been reported in medical literature
- Deaths: -

Congenital muscular dystrophy-infantile cataract-hypogonadism syndrome is a very rare genetic disorder which is characterized by congenital muscular dystrophy, infantile-onset cataract, and hypogonadism. Males usually develop Klinefelter syndrome while females develop agenesis of the ovaries. It has been described in eight individuals of which seven came from Finnmark County, Norway. Inheritance pattern is thought to be autosomal recessive.
