= Fine–Lubinsky syndrome =

- Specialty: Medical genetics
- Symptoms: facial dysmorphy, global developmental and speech delay, and ocular, behavioural and hearing problems.
- Usual onset: Birth
- Duration: Life-long
- Causes: Autosomal recessive genetic mutation
- Prevention: none
- Frequency: extremely rare

Fine–Lubinsky syndrome is a rare genetic disorder which is characterized by ocular and hearing problems, speech and developmental delay, short stature, intellectual disabilities and facial dysmorphisms.

== Presentation ==
Symptoms may vary from person to person, but they generally are (but are not limited to):

- Intellectual disabilities of varying degree
- Congenital hearing loss
- Congenital cataracts and/or glaucoma
- Brachycephaly
- Brain abnormalities (often leading to behavioral problems)
- Finger abnormalities
- Cleft palate
- Flat face
- Ptosis
- Long philtrum
- Small mouth
- Short nose
- Microstomia
- Scrotum hypoplasia

== Etiology ==
Although most cases of Fine–Lubinsky syndrome are sporadic, a case report of two siblings with this syndrome was published, suggesting that it is caused by autosomal recessive mutations in the MAF gene.
