= Odontoma dysphagia syndrome =

- Other names: Odontomatosis-aortae esophagus stenosis syndrome

Odontoma dysphagia syndrome (Bader syndrome) is a rare syndrome (<10 cases reported to date) first described in 1967. The cause is not known but it is suspected to be genetic in origin.

== Presentation ==
This syndrome is characterized by clustering of teeth (compound odontoma, dysplasia and aplasia of teeth), slight craniofacial abnormalities, and dysphagia. The dysphagia may be due to an overgrowth of muscle tissue or strictures in the oesophagus. Benign tumors (odontomas) may form at the roots of the teeth.

== Cause ==
The cause is thought to be genetic and it may inherited in an autosomal dominant fashion. A possible link to chromosome 11 (11q13.3) a region that included fibroblast growth factors 3 and 4 has been reported.
