= Aphalangia =

Aphalangia is a syndrome with the characteristic absence of the phalanx bone on one or more digits.

== See also ==
- Dactyly
