= Cooks syndrome =

- Other names: Anonychia-onychodystrophy with hypoplasia or absence of distal phalanges syndrome
- Autosomal dominant is the manner of inheritance of this condition

Cooks syndrome is a hereditary disorder which is characterized in the hands by bilateral nail hypoplasia on the thumb, index finger, and middle finger, absence of fingernails (anonychia) on the ring finger and little finger, lengthening of the thumbs, and bulbousness of the fingers. In the feet, it is characterized by absence of toenails and absence/hypoplasia of the distal phalanges. In the second study of this disorder, it was found that the intermediate phalanges, proximal phalanges, and metacarpals were unaffected.

The disorder was first described by Cooks et al. in 1985 after being discovered in two generations of one family. It was proposed that the inheritance of the disorder is autosomal dominant. A second family, this with three affected generations, confirmed that the inheritance of the disorder is autosomal dominant. Although several genetic disorders exist which can cause anonychia and onychodystrophy, such disorders often cause other anomalies such as deafness, intellectual disability, and defects of the hair, eyes, and teeth. Cooks syndrome is not known to cause any such anomalies.

In 1999, a pair of siblings was found with brachydactyly type B. Because the disorder primarily affected the nails and distal phalanges, the research group concluded that brachydactyly type B and Cooks syndrome are the same disorder. However, in 2007, a 2-year-old girl was found with symptoms consistent with both brachydactyly type B and Cooks syndrome. It was found that the two syndromes were distinct clinically, radiologically, and genetically.
