= Blepharoptosis-myopia-ectopia lentis syndrome =

- Specialty: Medical genetics
- Symptoms: blepharoptosis, severe nearsightedness, and ectopia lentis.
- Complications: vision impairment/disability
- Usual onset: Birth
- Duration: Life-long
- Prevention: none
- Prognosis: Good
- Frequency: very rare, only 3 cases known to medical literature.

Blepharoptosis-myopia-ectopia lentis syndrome is an extremely rare genetic disorder which is characterized by congenital bilateral blepharoptosis, presence of ectopia lentis, and severe near-sightedness (myopia). It affects (and consequently decreases) the relative strength of the levator aponeurosis, the zonules, and the sclera. It was first discovered during the mid-late winter of 1982, when W N Gillum et al. described the case of a 72-year-old woman and 2 of her also affected daughters with the symptoms mentioned above, one of the daughters (who had the symptoms since at least the age of 4) had unusually long globes and abnormally high upper eyelid creases. Levator function was unaffected. The symptoms of the 72-year-old woman were thought to be caused by a sporadic genetic mutation, which was subsequently transmitted to her daughters in an autosomal dominant fashion. No new cases have been reported since then (Feb 1982.)
