= Brachydactyly-long thumb syndrome =

- Other names: Long-thumb brachydactyly syndrome, brachydactyly long thumb type.
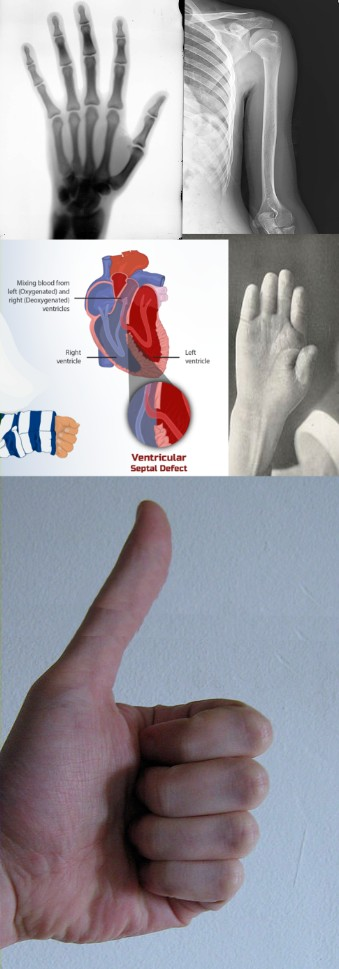
- Specialty: Medical genetics
- Symptoms: Brachydactyly, long thumb and heart defects.
- Complications: Possible death due to heart defects
- Usual onset: Birth
- Duration: Life-long
- Causes: Autosomal dominant inheritance
- Risk factors: Having a parent with the disorder
- Diagnostic method: Physical examination, X-ray, CT scan.
- Prevention: None
- Prognosis: Ok
- Frequency: very rare, only 4 cases have been reported.

Brachydactyly-long thumb syndrome is a very rare genetic disorder which is characterized by symmetric brachydactyly of the fingers accompanied by an abnormally long thumb, hypomobility of the shoulder and metacarpo-phalangeal joints, and heart conduction defects. Small feet and hands, small shoulders accompanied with short clavicles, clinodactyly, pectus excavatum, mild limb shortening, cardiomegaly, and pulmonic stenosis murmur have also been reported. It was first discovered when D W Hollister et al. described 4 affected members belonging to a 3-generation family. No new cases have been reported since 1981. This disorder is inherited in an autosomal dominant manner.
