= Berlin's edema =

- Other names: Berlin's oedema

Berlin's edema (commotio retinae) a common condition caused by blunt injury to the eye. It is characterized by decreased vision in the injured eye a few hours after the injury. Under examination the retina appears opaque and white in colour in the periphery but the blood vessels are normally seen along with "cherry red spot" in the foveal region. This whitening is indicative of cell damage, which occurs in the retinal pigment epithelium and outer segment layer of photoreceptors. Damage to the outer segment often results in photoreceptor death through uncertain mechanisms. Usually there is no leakage of fluid and therefore it is not considered a true edema. The choroidal fluorescence in fluorescent angiography is absent. Visual acuity ranges from 20/20 to 20/400.

== Presentation ==
Patients with commotio retinae are typically asymptomatic but may report blurred vision, loss of vision, a central or paracentral scotoma, or metamorphopsia. On fundoscopic examination, the classic finding is an area of retinal whitening or opacification; the blood vessels remain undisturbed, which is a distinguishing feature of the condition. A "pseudo-cherry red spot" may be visible in the posterior segment in some patients, and severe cases may leave residual retinal pigment epithelium changes, atrophy, or hyperpigmentation after the acute opacification resolves. Additional signs of associated ocular trauma such as hyphema, iridodialysis, vitreous hemorrhage, choroidal rupture, or orbital fracture may also be present on examination.

== Cause ==
Commotio retinae results from blunt force or blast trauma to the eye, producing a contrecoup injury to the neurosensory retina. Direct blunt ocular trauma displaces and deforms the globe; hydraulic forces are transmitted posteriorly, causing mechanical disruption of the photoreceptor outer segments. Indirect mechanisms, such as blast injury, transmit shockwaves that induce shearing forces, and secondary deformation can also arise from distention of vitreoretinal attachments.

The condition most commonly occurs in young males, and recognised risk factors include high-impact ball sports, violence, and motor vehicle collisions. It accounts for roughly 0.4% of all civilian eye injuries and approximately 15% of military eye injuries.

The primary injury is at the level of the photoreceptor outer segments, which correspond to the areas of retinal whitening seen on examination; this disruption and disorientation of outer segments is thought to cause increased scattering of light. Berlin originally attributed the opacification to extracellular oedema, a hypothesis that proved controversial; subsequent experimental and in vivo studies determined that the principal mechanism is instead disruption of the photoreceptor outer segments rather than true extracellular oedema. Within the first week after injury, damaged photoreceptor cells undergo degeneration, and retinal pigment epithelium (RPE) cells phagocytose the affected outer segments; the vacated spaces are then occupied by proliferating intact RPE cells, which can clinically manifest as RPE changes and hyperpigmentation during recovery. Histological studies have shown that restoration of photoreceptor outer segments may begin within days and continue for up to several months.

== Diagnosis ==
Because it is noninvasive and comfortable, optical coherence tomography (OCT) is an important instrument in the evaluation of individuals with posterior segment trauma, particularly acute traumatic maculopathy. OCT findings in Berlin's edema have included increased reflectivity because of photoreceptor outer segment disruption and, less frequently, hyper-reflectivity of inner retinal layers. Other findings include increased central retinal thickness, a low signal triangular area below the foveal pit, and outer retinal thickening. Fracture of the inner segment/outer segment layer, change of retinal pigment epithelium interdigitation linked to intraretinal edema of the outer nuclear layer, neurosensory retinal detachment, and increased reflectivity of the line at the junction of the photoreceptor inner and outer segments in the healing phase have also been reported in Berlin's edema.

== Prognosis ==
The prognosis is excellent except in case of complications of choroidal rupture, hemorrhage or pigment epithelial damage, but damage to the macula will result in poorer recovery. The outcome can be worsened in the case of retinal detachment, atrophy or hyperplasia. Visual field defects can occur. In late cases cystoid macular edema sometimes develops which can further lead to macular destruction. Commotio retinae is usually self limiting and there is no treatment as such. It usually resolves in 3–4 weeks without any complications and sequelae.
