= Minor physical anomalies =

Morphological phenomenon

Minor physical anomalies (MPAs) are relatively minor (typically painless and, in themselves, harmless) congenital physical abnormalities consisting of features such as low-set ears, single transverse palmar crease, telecanthus, micrognathism, macrocephaly, hypotonia and furrowed tongue. While MPAs may have a genetic basis, they might also be caused by factors in the fetal environment: anoxia, bleeding, or infection. MPAs have been linked to disorders of pregnancy and are thought by some to be a marker for insults to the fetal neural development towards the end of the first trimester. Thus, in the neurodevelopmental literature, they are seen as indirect indications of interferences with brain development.

MPAs have been studied in autism, Down syndrome, and in schizophrenia. A 2008 meta-analysis found that MPAs are significantly increased in the autistic population. A 1998 study found that 60% of its schizophrenic sample and 38% of their siblings had 6 or more MPAs (especially in the craniofacial area), while only 5% of the control group showed that many.

The most often cited MPA, high arched palate, is described in articles as a microform of a cleft palate. Cleft palates are partly attributable to hypoxia. The vaulted palate caused by nasal obstruction and consequent mouth breathing, without the lateralising effect of the tongue, can produce hypoxia at night.

Other MPAs are reported only sporadically. Capillary malformation is induced by RASA1 mutation and can be changed by hypoxia. A study in the American Journal of Psychiatry by Trixler et al.: found hemangiomas to be highly significant in schizophrenia. Exotropia is reported as having low correlation and high significance as well. It can be caused by perinatal hypoxia.

== See also ==
- Incidentaloma
- Fluctuating asymmetry
- Developmental theory of crime
