= Brachydactyly type D =

Abnormal shortening of the distal part of the thumb

Brachydactyly type D (or considered uneven thumbnails)
- Other names: Clubbed thumb, thumb head, short thumb, potter's thumb, royal thumb, murderer's thumb, hammer thumb, stubbed thumb, stub thumb
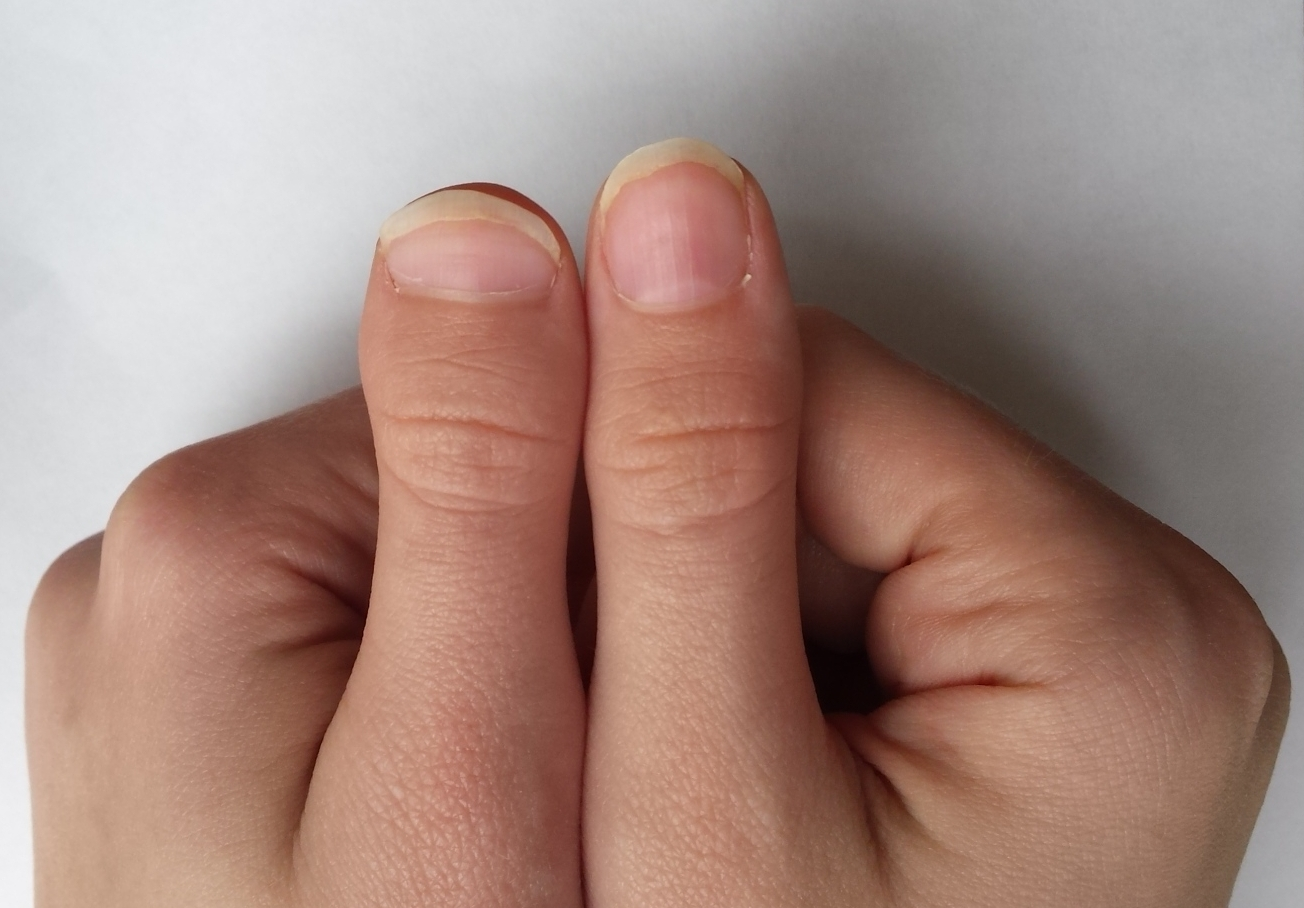
- Unilateral brachydactyly type D in an adolescent female
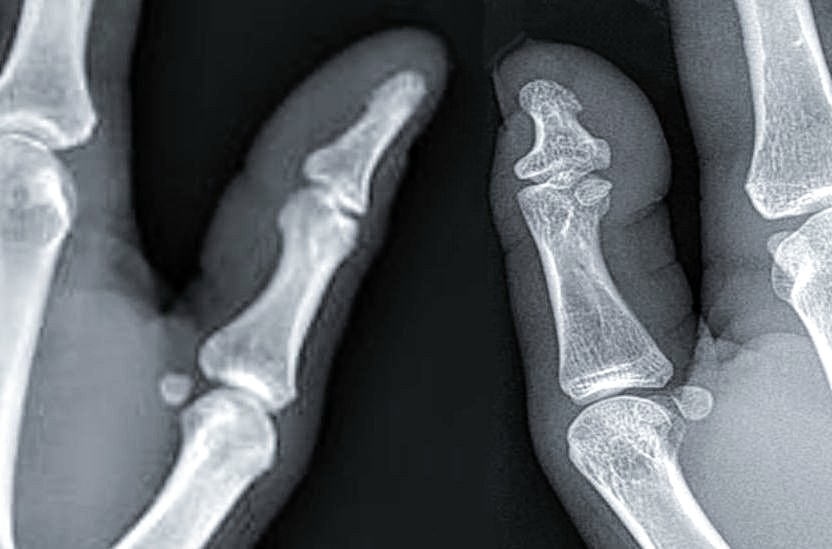
- X-ray of a regular thumb (left) and a thumb with brachydactyly type D (right) showing distal phalanx brachyphalangy of said thumb.
- Specialty: Medical genetics

Brachydactyly type D, also known as murderer's thumb, stubbed thumb, spoon thumb, power thumb, short thumb, or toe thumb, is a genetic trait recognised by a thumb being relatively short and round with an accompanying wider nail bed. The distal phalanx of such thumbs is approximately two-thirds the length of full-length thumbs. It is the most common type of shortness of digits (brachydactyly), affecting approximately 2% of the population. It is associated with the HOXD13 gene, located on chromosome 2q31.1.

== Signs and symptoms ==
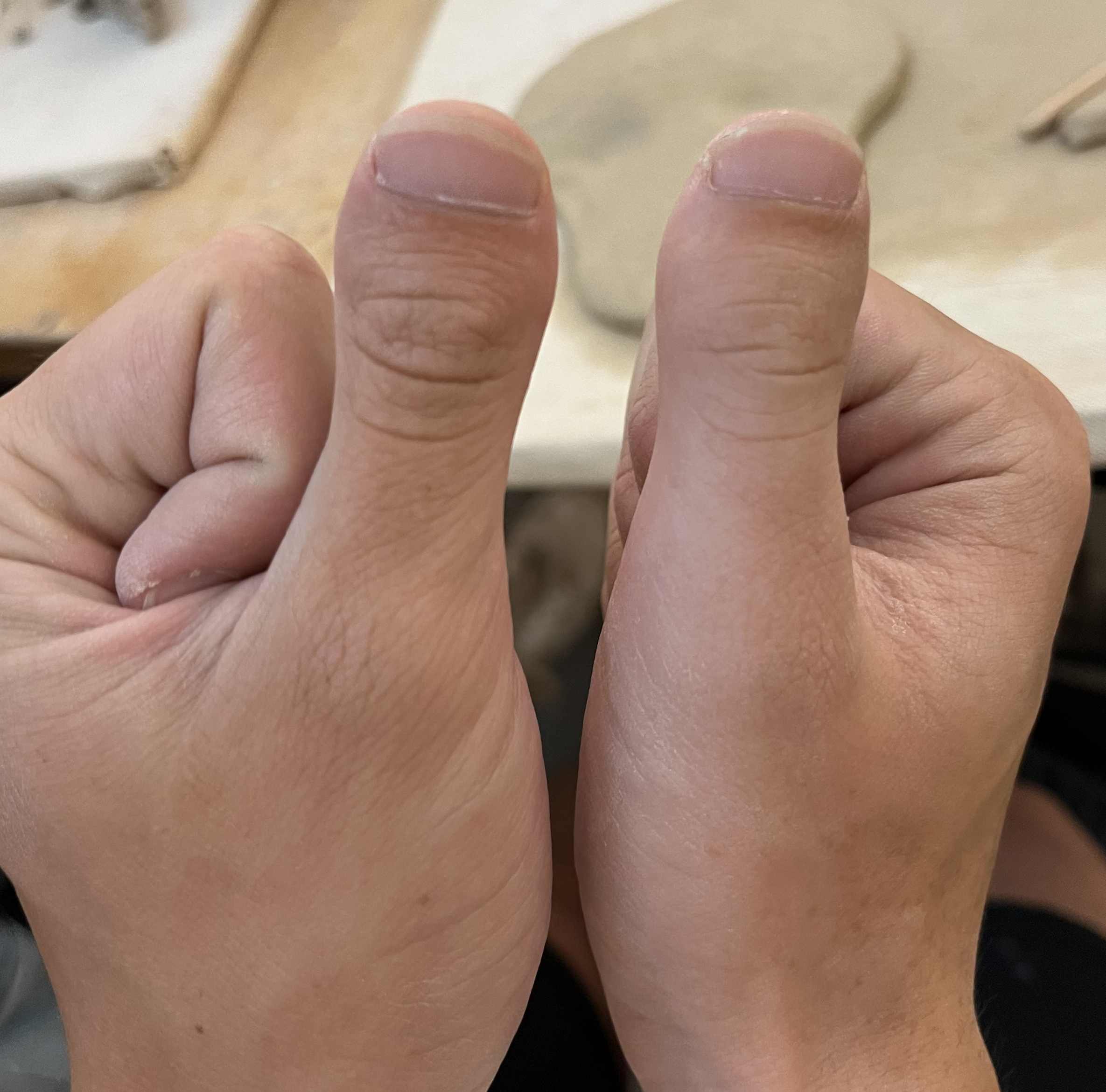
Brachydactyly type D in both hands of an adolescent male.

Brachydactyly type D is a skeletal condition that exhibits a “partial fusion or premature closing of the epiphysis with the distal phalanx of the thumb,” according to Goodman et alia (1965). J.K. Breitenbecher (1923) found that the distal phalanges of short thumbs were one-half the length of full-length thumbs, while R.M. Stecher (1957) claimed that it is approximately two-thirds. The condition may be unilateral (affecting one thumb) or bilateral (affecting both).

== Genetics ==
Brachydactyly type D is a genetic trait. It exhibits autosomal dominance and is commonly developed or inherited independently of other hereditary traits. The condition is associated with the HOXD13 gene, which is central in digital formation and growth.

Various other studies supported an autosomal dominant pattern with reduced penetrance.

== Terminology ==
The condition is also called clubbed thumb or club thumb. American researcher R.A. Hefner used the terms "short thumb" and "brachymegalodactylism" in 1924, and "short thumb" has continued to be used in a few other studies since then, including the study that defined Rubinstein–Taybi syndrome in 1963. "Stub thumb" is the common term preferred by the online database Online Mendelian Inheritance in Man and was first used in a 1965 study. Stub thumbs have also been called hammer thumbs, bohemian thumbs, and potter's thumbs.
