= Brachydactyly =

Abnormally short fingers or toes

- Different forms of brachydactyly
- Specialty: Medical genetics

Brachydactyly (from Greek βραχύς (brachus) 'short' and δάκτυλος (daktulos) 'finger') is a medical term denoting the presence of abnormally short digits (fingers or toes) at birth. The shortness is relative to the length of other long bones and other parts of the body. Brachydactyly is an inherited, dominant trait. It most often occurs as an isolated dysmelia, but can also occur with other anomalies as part of many congenital syndromes. Brachydactyly may also be a signal that one is at risk for congenital heart disease due to the association between congenital heart disease and Carpenter syndrome and the link between Carpenter syndrome and brachydactyly.

Nomograms for normal values of finger length as a ratio to other body measurements have been published. In clinical genetics, the most commonly used index of digit length is the dimensionless ratio of the length of the third (middle) finger to the hand length. Both are expressed in the same units (centimeters, for example) and are measured in an open hand from the fingertip to the principal creases where the finger joins the palm and where the palm joins the wrist.

== Causes ==
Generally, brachydactyly is inherited through an autosomal dominant trait (The exact gene may differ see "Types" table for specific genes). However exceptions could exist due to antiepileptic medicines taken during pregnancy or low blood flow to the extremities during infancy.

== Symptoms ==
Symptoms of isolated brachydactyly include shorter bones in the hands and feet. This could include, phalanges, metacarpals, metatarsals, carpals, and tarsals. Different types of isolated brachydactyly have different symptoms and they are grouped according to what areas they affect.

== Prognosis ==
Isolated brachydactyly does not affect the wellbeing nor longevity of one's life, in most cases treatment is not necessary. The trait is primarily a cosmetic one and does not, in most cases, affect function of the hands and feet. Even left untreated and affecting function the general diagnosis of brachydactyly does not impact life expectancy. Prognosis may differ with different types or syndromes. ie. brachydactyly-mesomelia-intellectual disability-heart defects syndrome or if brachydactyly is not isolated and is a part of a larger genetic condition. In rare cases of isolated untreated brachydactyly, simple functions like walking or grabbing objects may be difficult, reducing the overall quality of life.

== Treatment ==
Treatment is needed only if brachydactyly affects the function of the phalanges. In rare cases where function is affected, reconstructive surgery is used to improve function and the ability to use one's phalanges. Cosmetic surgery (which is often confused with reconstructive surgery, but differs in that cosmetic surgery is not medically necessary, while reconstructive is) changes the way the affected areas appear.

== Diagnosis ==
Brachydactyly is usually diagnosed through anthropometric, clinical, or radiological methods. It is usually found early during infancy or in childhood years when the size difference becomes noticeable. It normally gets diagnosed as the difference in phalange size becomes more apparent. Healthcare providers complete a medical history, physical exam of symptoms and use radiographs (X-rays). The X-rays show whether certain bones are shorter than others or shorter than they are expected to be. Along with these diagnostic steps, the healthcare provider may conduct a genetic test. This could be to see if the disorder runs in the family and has been passed down or to identify the defective gene.

== Epidemiology ==
Most isolated forms of brachydactyly are considered rare, that is, diseases affecting fewer than 200,000 people. However, type A3 and type D are relatively common, affecting around 2% of the population. Particularly high prevalence of brachydactyly type D was reported among Israeli Arabs and in the Japanese population. Type A3 was found at an especially high frequency of 21% among Japanese schoolchildren.

== Types ==
There are several types of brachydactyly:

Type	OMIM	Gene	Locus	Also known as	Description
Type A1, BDA1	112500	IHH BDA1B	5p13.3-p13.2, 2q33-q35	Brachydactyly type A1 or Farabee-type brachydactyly.	BDA1 is an autosomal dominant inherited disease. Features include: short or absent phalanges, extra carpal bones, hypoplastic or absent ulna and short metacarpal bones.
Type A2, BDA2	112600	BMPR1B GDF5	20q11.2, 4q23-q24	Brachydactyly type A2, Brachymesophalangy II or Brachydactyly Mohr-Wriedt type.	Type A2 is a very rare form of brachydactyly. The phalanges of the index fingers and second toes are shortened.
Type A3, BDA3	112700	HOXD13		Brachydactyly type A3, brachymesophalangy V or brachydactyly-clinodactyly.	Type A3 only shortens the middle bone of the little finger.
Type A4, BDA4	112800	HOXD13	2q31-q32	Brachydactyly type A4, brachymesophalangy II and V or brachydactyly temtamy type.	Characterized by shortened 2nd and 5th fingers and an absence of the 2nd-5th lateral toes.
Type A5, BDA5	112900			Brachydactyly type A5 nail dysplasia.	
Type A6, BDA6	112910			Brachydactyly type A6 or Osebold-Remondini syndrome.	
Type A7, BDA7				Brachydactyly type A7 or brachydactyly smorgasbord type.	
Type B, BDB (or BDB1)	113000	ROR2	9q22	Brachydactyly type B or Cooks syndrome.	Type B affects the final bones of all eight fingers. It causes the bone to be shortened or missing entirely. The same thing happens to the corresponding toes. The final thumb bones and big toe bones may be split or flatter than average.
Type C, BDC	113100	GDF5	20q11.2	Brachydactyly type C or Brachydactyly Haws type.	This rare form of brachydactyly only affects three fingers on each hand. The index, middle, and little finger will have their middle bone shortened. The ring finger will not be affected. As a result, type C brachydactyly will leave the ring finger as the longest on the hand.
Type D, BDD	113200	HOXD13	2q31-q32	Brachydactyly type D. "Stub Thumb" Referred to inaccurately as "clubbed thumbs".	Most common form of brachydactyly. It shortens the final bone in the thumbs and does not affect the fingers at all.
Type E, BDE	113300	HOXD13	2q31-q32	Brachydactyly type E.	This is the rarest form of brachydactyly. It is most often part of another condition that someone is born with. Type E shortens the bones in the hands and feet along with the bottom bone in the fingers. Instead of making the fingers and toes look shorter, it makes the hands and feet look smaller.
Type B and E	112440	ROR2 HOXD13	9q22, 2q31-q32	Brachydactyly types B and E combined, Ballard syndrome or Pitt-Williams brachydactyly.	
Type A1B, BDA1B	607004		5p13.3-p13.2	Brachydactyly type A1, B.	

== Other syndromes ==
In the above brachydactyly syndromes, short digits are the most prominent of the anomalies, but in many other syndromes (Down syndrome, Rubinstein–Taybi syndrome, etc.), brachydactyly is a minor feature compared to the other anomalies or problems comprising the syndrome.

== See also ==
- Hypertension and brachydactyly syndrome
- Thumb stiffness-brachydactyly-intellectual disability syndrome
- Short thumb
- Syndactyly
- Kirner's deformity
