= List of diseases (P) =

This is a list of diseases starting with the letter "P".

== Pa ==
=== Pac–Pal ===
- Pachydermoperiostosis
- Pachygyria
- Pachyonychia congenita Jackson–Lawler type
- Pacman dysplasia
- Paes–Whelan–Modi syndrome
- Paget disease extramammary
- Paget disease juvenile type
- Paget's disease of bone
- Paget's disease of the breast
- Paget's disease, type 1
- Pagon–Bird–Detter syndrome
- Pagon–Stephan syndrome
- Pai–Levkoff syndrome
- Palant cleft palate syndrome
- Palindromic rheumatism
- Pallister–Hall syndrome
- Pallister–Killian syndrome
- Palmer–Pagon syndrome
- Palmitoyl-protein thioesterase deficiency
- Palmoplantar Keratoderma
- Palmoplantar porokeratosis of Mantoux
- Palsy cerebral

=== Pan ===
- Panayiotopoulos syndrome
- Pancreas agenesis
- Pancreas divisum
- Pancreatic adenoma
- Pancreatic beta cell agenesis with neonatal diabetes mellitus
- Pancreatic cancer
- Pancreatic carcinoma, familial
- Pancreatic diseases
- Pancreatic islet cell neoplasm
- Pancreatic islet cell tumors
- Pancreatic lipomatosis duodenal stenosis
- Pancreatitis, hereditary
- Pancreatoblastoma
- Panhypopituitarism
- Panic disorder
- Panmyelophthisis aplastic anemia
- Panniculitis
- Panophobia
- Panostotic fibrous dysplasia
- Panthophobia

=== Pap ===
- Papilledema
- Papillon–Lefèvre syndrome
- Papillitis of the lingual papillae
- Papillitis of the optic nerve
- Papilloma of choroid plexus
- Papular mucinosis
- Papular urticaria

=== Par ===
==== Para–Pari ====
- Paracoccidioidomycosis
- Paraganglioma
- Parainfluenza virus type 3 antenatal infection
- Paramyotonia congenita of von Eulenburg
- Paramyotonia congenita
- Paraneoplastic cerebellar degeneration
- Paranoid personality disorder
- Paraomphalocele
- Paraparesis amyotrophy of hands and feet
- Paraphilia
- Paraplegia
- Paraplegia-brachydactyly-cone shaped epiphysis
- Paraplegia-mental retardation-hyperkeratosis
- Parapsoriasis
- Parasitophobia
- Parastremmatic dwarfism
- Parathyroid cancer
- Parathyroid neoplasm
- Paratyphoid fever
- PARC syndrome
- Parenchymatous cortical degeneration of cerebellum
- Paris-Trousseau thrombopenia

==== Park–Parv ====
- Parkes Weber syndrome
- Parkinson's disease
- Parkinson dementia Steele type
- Parkinsonism early onset mental retardation
- Parkinsonism
- Paronychia
- Paroxysmal cold hemoglobinuria
- Paroxysmal dystonic choreoathetosis
- Paroxysmal nocturnal hemoglobinuria
- Paroxysmal ventricular fibrillation
- Parry–Romberg syndrome
- Pars planitis
- Parsonage–Turner syndrome
- Partial agenesis of corpus callosum
- Partial atrioventricular canal
- Partial deletion of Y
- Partial gigantism in context of NF
- Partial lissencephaly
- Partington–Anderson syndrome
- Partington–Mulley syndrome
- Parturiphobia
- Paruresis
- Parvovirus antenatal infection

=== Pas–Pat ===
- Pascuel–Castroviejo syndrome
- Pashayan syndrome
- Passive-aggressive personality disorder
- Patau syndrome
- Patel–Bixler syndrome
- Patella aplasia, coxa vara, tarsal synostosis
- Patella hypoplasia mental retardation
- Patellofemoral pain syndrome
- Patent ductus arteriosus familial
- Patent ductus arteriosus
- Patterson–Lowry syndrome
- Patterson pseudoleprechaunism syndrome
- Patterson–Stevenson syndrome

=== Pau–Pav ===
- Pauciarticular chronic arthritis
- Pavone–Fiumara–Rizzo syndrome

== Pe ==
=== Pea–Pem ===
- Peanut hypersensitivity
- Pearson's marrow/pancreas syndrome
- Pediatric T-cell leukemia
- Pediculosis
- Peeling skin syndrome ichthyosis
- PEHO syndrome
- Pelizaeus–Merzbacher brain sclerosis
- Pelizaeus–Merzbacher disease, recessive, acute infantile
- Pelizaeus–Merzbacher disease
- Pelizaeus–Merzbacher leukodystrophy
- Pellagra
- Pellagra like syndrome
- Pellagrophobia
- Pelvic dysplasia arthrogryposis of lower limbs
- Pelvic girdle pain
- Pelvic inflammatory disease
- Pelvic lipomatosis
- Pelvic shoulder dysplasia
- Pemphigus and fogo selvagem
- Pemphigus foliaceus
- Pemphigus vulgaris, familial
- Pemphigus vulgaris
- Pemphigus

=== Pen–Pep ===
- Pena–Shokeir syndrome
- Pendred syndrome
- Penile agenesis
- Penile cancer
- Penoscrotal transposition
- Penta X syndrome
- Pentalogy of Cantrell
- Pentosuria
- Penttinen–Aula syndrome
- PEPCK 1 deficiency
- PEPCK 2 deficiency
- PEPCK deficiency, mitochondrial
- Peptidic growth factors deficiency

=== Per ===
- Perceptual disorder

==== Peri ====
- Periarteritis nodosa
- Pericardial constriction with growth failure
- Pericardial defect diaphragmatic hernia
- Pericardium absent mental retardation short stature
- Pericardium congenital anomaly
- Perilymphatic fistula
- Perimyositis
- Perinatal infections
- Periodic disease
- Periodic fever, aphthous stomatitis, pharyngitis and adenitis
- Periodic limb movement disorder
- Periodontal disease / Periodontitis
- Perioral dermatitis
- Peripartum cardiomyopathy
- Peripheral blood vessel disorder
- Peripheral nervous disorder
- Peripheral neuroectodermal tumor
- Peripheral neuropathy
- Peripheral T-cell lymphoma
- Peripheral type neurofibromatosis
- Perisylvian syndrome
- Peritonitis
- Periventricular laminar heterotopia
- Periventricular leukomalacia

==== Perl–Pert ====
- Perlman syndrome
- Pernicious anemia
- Perniola–Krajewska–Carnevale syndrome
- Perniosis
- Peroxisomal Bifunctional Enzyme Deficiency
- Peroxisomal defects
- Persistent Müllerian duct syndrome
- Persistent parvovirus infection
- Persistent sexual arousal syndrome
- Persistent truncus arteriosus
- Perthes disease
- Pertussis

=== Pes–Pey ===
- Pes planus
- Peters anomaly with cataract
- Peters anomaly
- Peters congenital glaucoma
- Petit–Fryns syndrome
- Petty–Laxova–Wiedemann syndrome
- Peutz–Jeghers syndrome
- Peyronie disease

== Pf ==
- Pfeiffer cardiocranial syndrome
- Pfeiffer–Hirschfelder–Rott syndrome
- Pfeiffer–Kapferer syndrome
- Pfeiffer–Mayer syndrome
- Pfeiffer–Palm–Teller syndrome
- Pfeiffer–Rockelein syndrome
- Pfeiffer–Singer–Zschiesche syndrome
- Pfeiffer syndrome
- Pfeiffer–Tietze–Welte syndrome
- Pfeiffer type acrocephalosyndactyly

== Ph ==
=== Pha–Phi ===
- PHACE association
- Phacomatosis fourth
- Phacomatosis pigmentokeratotica
- Phacomatosis pigmentovascularis
- Phalacrophobia
- Pharmacophobia
- Pharyngitis
- Phenobarbital antenatal infection
- Phenobarbital embryopathy
- Phenol sulfotransferase deficiency
- Phenothiazine antenatal infection
- Phenylalanine hydroxylase deficiency
- Phenylalaninemia
- Phenylketonuria type II
- Phenylketonuria
- Phenylketonuric embryopathy
- Pheochromocytoma as part of NF
- Pheochromocytoma
- Philadelphia-negative chronic myeloid leukemia

=== Pho–Pht ===
- Phocomelia contractures absent thumb
- Phocomelia ectrodactyly deafness sinus arrhythmia
- Phocomelia Schinzel type
- Phocomelia syndrome
- Phocomelia thrombocytopenia encephalocele
- Phosphate diabetes
- Phosphoenolpyruvate carboxykinase 1 deficiency
- Phosphoenolpyruvate carboxykinase 2 deficiency
- Phosphoenolpyruvate carboxykinase deficiency
- Phosphoglucomutase deficiency type 1
- Phosphoglucomutase deficiency type 2
- Phosphoglucomutase deficiency type 3
- Phosphoglucomutase deficiency type 4
- Phosphoglucomutase deficiency
- Phosphoglycerate kinase 1 deficiency
- Phosphoglycerate kinase deficiency
- Phosphomannoisomerase deficiency
- Phosphoribosylpyrophosphate synthetase deficiency
- Photoaugliaphobia
- Photosensitive epilepsy
- Phthiriophobia

=== Phy ===
- Physical urticaria
- Phytanic acid oxidase deficiency
- Phytophotodermatitis

== Pi ==
=== Pib–Pig ===
- PIBI(D)S syndrome
- Pica
- Picardi–Lassueur–Little syndrome
- Pick disease
- Pickardt syndrome
- Pie Torcido
- Piebald trait neurologic defects
- Piebaldism
- Piepkorn–Karp–Hickoc syndrome
- Pierre Marie cerebellar ataxia
- Pierre Robin sequence
- Pigmentary retinopathy
- Pigment dispersion syndrome
- Pigmented villonodular synovitis
- Pignata guarino syndrome

=== Pil–Piu ===
- Pili canulati
- Pili multigemini
- Pili torti developmental delay neurological abnormalities
- Pili torti nerve deafness
- Pili torti onychodysplasia
- Pili torti
- Pillay syndrome
- Pilo dento ungular dysplasia microcephaly
- Pilonidal cyst
- Pilotto syndrome
- Pinealoma
- Pinheiro–Freire–Maia–Miranda syndrome
- Pinsky–Di George–Harley syndrome
- Pinta
- Pipecolic acidemia
- PIRA
- Pitt–Hopkins syndrome
- Pitt–Rogers–Danks syndrome
- Pituitary dwarfism 1
- Pityriasis lichenoides chronica
- Pityriasis lichenoides et varioliformis acuta
- Pityriasis rubra pilaris
- Piussan–Lenaerts–Mathieu syndrome

== Pl–Pn ==
- Placenta disorder
- Placenta neoplasm
- Placental abruption
- Plagiocephaly X linked mental retardation
- Plague
  - Plague, bubonic
  - Plague, meningeal
  - Plague, pharyngeal
  - Plague, pneumonic
  - Plague, septicemic
- Plasmacytoma anaplastic
- Plasmalogenes synthesis deficiency isolated
- Plasminogen activator inhibitor type 1 deficiency, congenital
- Plasminogen deficiency, congenital
- Platelet disorder
- Platyspondylic lethal chondrodysplasia
- Platyspondyly amelogenesis imperfecta
- Pleural effusion
- Pleurisy
- Pleuritis
- Plexosarcoma
- Plummer–Vinson syndrome
- Pneumoconiosis
- Pneumocystis jiroveci pneumonia
- Pneumocystosis
- Pneumonia
- Pneumonia, eosinophilic
- Pneumonoultramicroscopicsilicovolcanoconiosis
- Pneumothorax

== Po ==
=== Pod–Poi ===
- Podder-Tolmie syndrome
- POEMS syndrome
- Poedimus kyleopecia mental retardation
- Poikiloderma congenital with bullae Weary type
- Poikiloderma hereditary acrokeratotic Weary type
- Poikiloderma of Kindler
- Poikiloderma of Rothmund–Thomson
- Poikilodermatomyositis mental retardation
- Poikilodermia alopecia retrognathism cleft palate
- Pointer syndrome

=== Pol ===
==== Pola–Poli ====
- Poland syndrome
- Poliomyelitis (Polio)
- Poliosophobia

==== Poly ====
===== Polya–Polyc =====
- Polyarteritis nodosa
- Polyarteritis
- Polyarthritis, systemic
- Polyarthritis
- Polychondritis
- Polycystic kidney disease, adult type
- Polycystic kidney disease, infantile type
- Polycystic kidney disease, infantile, type I
- Polycystic kidney disease, recessive type
- Polycystic kidney disease, type 1
- Polycystic kidney disease, type 2
- Polycystic kidney disease, type 3
- Polycystic kidney disease
- Polycystic ovaries urethral sphincter dysfunction
- Polycythemia vera

===== Polyd–Polyo =====
- Polydactyly alopecia seborrheic dermatitis
- Polydactyly cleft lip palate psychomotor retardation
- Polydactyly myopia syndrome
- Polydactyly postaxial dental and vertebral
- Polydactyly postaxial with median cleft of upper lip
- Polydactyly postaxial
- Polydactyly preaxial type 1
- Polydactyly syndrome middle ray duplication
- Polydactyly visceral anomalies cleft lip palate
- Polydactyly
- Polyendocrine metabolic ovarian syndrome (PMOS) (formerly known as polycystic ovary syndrome (PCOS))
- Polyglucosan body disease, adult
- Polymicrogyria turricephaly hypogenitalism
- Polymorphic catecholergic ventricular tachycardia
- Polymorphic macular degeneration
- Polymorphous low-grade adenocarcinoma
- Polymyalgia rheumatica
- Polymyositis
- Polyneuritis
- Polyneuropathy hand defect
- Polyneuropathy mental retardation acromicria prema
- Polyomavirus Infections
- Polyostotic fibrous dysplasia

===== Polyp–Polys =====
- Polyposis, hamartomatous intestinal
- Polyposis skin pigmentation alopecia fingernail changes
- Polysyndactyly cardiac malformation
- Polysyndactyly microcephaly ptosis
- Polysyndactyly orofacial anomalies
- Polysyndactyly overgrowth syndrome
- Polysyndactyly trigonocephaly agenesis of corpus callosum
- Polysyndactyly type 4
- Polysyndactyly type Haas

=== Pom–Por ===
- Pompe's disease
- Poncet–Spiegler's cylindroma
- Pontoneocerebellar Hypoplasia
- Popliteal pterygium syndrome lethal type
- Popliteal pterygium syndrome
- Porencephaly cerebellar hypoplasia malformations
- Porencephaly
- Porokeratosis of Mibelli
- Porokeratosis plantaris palmaris et disseminata
- Porokeratosis punctata palmaris et plantaris
- Porphyria
- Porphyria cutanea tarda, familial type
- Porphyria cutanea tarda, sporadic type
- Porphyria cutanea tarda
- Porphyria, acute intermittent
- Porphyria, Ala-D
- Porphyria, congenital erythropoietic
- Porphyria, hereditary coproporphyria
- Portal hypertension due to intrahepatic block
- Portal hypertension
- Portal thrombosis
- Portal vein thrombosis
- Portuguese type amyloidosis

=== Pos–Pox ===
- Positive rheumatoid factor polyarthritis
- Post-polio syndrome
- Post Traumatic Stress disorder (PTSD)
- Postaxial polydactyly mental retardation
- Posterior tibial tendon rupture
- Posterior urethral valves
- Posterior uveitis
- Posterior valve urethra
- Post-infectious myocarditis
- Post-partum depression
- Post-traumatic epilepsy
- Postural hypotension
- Postural orthostatic tachycardia syndrome
- Potassium aggravated myotonia
- Potassium deficiency (hypokalemia)
- Potter disease type 1
- Potter disease, type 3
- Potter sequence cleft cardiopathy
- Potter syndrome dominant type
- Powell–Buist–Stenzel syndrome
- Powell–Chandra–Saal syndrome
- Powell–Venencie–Gordon syndrome
- Poxviridae disease

== Pr ==
=== Pra–Pre ===
- Prader–Willi syndrome
- Prata–Liberal–Goncalves syndrome
- Preaxial deficiency postaxial polydactyly hypospadia
- Preaxial polydactyly colobomata mental retardation
- Precocious epileptic encephalopathy
- Precocious myoclonic encephalopathy
- Precocious puberty
  - Precocious puberty, gonadotropin-dependent
  - Precocious puberty, male limited
- Preeclampsia
- Preeyasombat Viravithya syndrome
- Pregnancy toxemia /hypertension
- Prekallikrein deficiency, congenital
- Premature aging, Okamoto type
- Premature aging
- Premature atherosclerosis photomyoclonic epilepsy
- Premature menopause, familial
- Premature ovarian failure
- Premenstrual dysphoric disorder
- Prenatal infections
- Presbycusis
- Presbyopia
- Pressure ulcer

=== Pri ===
- Prieto–Badia–Mulas syndrome
- Prieur–Griscelli syndrome
- Primary agammaglobulinemia
- Primary aldosteronism
- Primary alveolar hypoventilation
- Primary amenorrhea
- Primary biliary cirrhosis
- Primary ciliary dyskinesia, 2
- Primary ciliary dyskinesia
- Primary craniosynostosis
- Primary cutaneous amyloidosis
- Primary granulocytic sarcoma
- Primary hyperoxaluria
- Primary hyperparathyroidism
- Primary lateral sclerosis
- Primary malignant lymphoma
- Primary muscular atrophy
- Primary orthostatic tremor
- Primary progressive aphasia
- Primary pulmonary hypertension
- Primary sclerosing cholangitis
- Primary tubular proximal acidosis
- Primerose syndrome
- Primordial microcephalic dwarfism Crachami type
- Prinzmetal's variant angina

=== Pro ===
==== Proc ====
- Procarcinoma
- Processing disorder
- Proconvertin deficiency, congenital
- Procrastination
- Proctitis

==== Prog ====
- Progeria short stature pigmented nevi
- Progeria variant syndrome Ruvalcaba type
- Progeria
- Progeroid syndrome De Barsy type
- Progeroid syndrome Petty type
- Progeroid syndrome, Penttinen type
- Prognathism dominant
- Progressive acromelanosis
- Progressive black carbon hyperpigmentation of infancy
- Progressive diaphyseal dysplasia
- Progressive external ophthalmoplegia
- Progressive hearing loss stapes fixation
- Progressive kinking of the hair, acquired
- Progressive multifocal leukoencephalopathy
- Progressive myositis ossificans
- Progressive osseous heteroplasia
- Progressive spinal muscular atrophy
- Progressive supranuclear palsy atypical
- Progressive supranuclear palsy
- Progressive systemic sclerosis

==== Prol–Prou ====
- Prolactinoma, familial
- Proliferating trichilemmal cyst
- Prolidase deficiency
- Prolymphocytic leukemia
- Properdin deficiency
- Prosencephaly cerebellar dysgenesis
- Prosopamnesia
- Prostaglandin antenatal infection
- Prostate cancer
- Prostate cancer, familial
- Prostatic malacoplakia associated with prostatic abscess
- Prostatitis
- Protein C deficiency
- Protein–energy malnutrition
- Protein R deficiency
- Protein S acquired deficiency
- Protein S deficiency
- Proteus like syndrome mental retardation eye defect
- Proteus syndrome
- Prothrombin deficiency
- Protoporphyria, erythropoietic
- Protoporphyria
- Proud–Levine–Carpenter syndrome

==== Prox ====
- Proximal myotonic dystrophy
- Proximal myotonic myopathy
- Proximal spinal muscular atrophy
- Proximal tubulopathy diabetes mellitus cerebellar ataxia

=== Pru ===
- Prune belly syndrome
- Prurigo nodularis

== Ps ==
=== Pse ===
==== Psel ====
- Psellismophobia

==== Pseu ====
===== Pseud =====
====== Pseudo ======
Pseudoa–Pseudom

- Pseudoachondroplasia
- Pseudoachondroplastic dysplasia 1
- Pseudoachondroplastic dysplasia
- Pseudoadrenoleukodystrophy
- Pseudoaminopterin syndrome
- Pseudoarylsulfatase A deficiency
- Pseudocholinesterase deficiency
- Pseudo-Gaucher disease
- Pseudogout
- Pseudohermaphrodism anorectal anomalies; see Anorectal malformation
- Pseudohermaphroditism female skeletal anomalies
- Pseudohermaphroditism male with gynecomastia
- Pseudohermaphroditism mental retardation
- Pseudohermaphroditism
- Pseudohypoaldosteronism type 1
- Pseudohypoaldosteronism type 2
- Pseudohypoaldosteronism
- Pseudohypoparathyroidism
- Pseudomarfanism
- Pseudomonas infection
  - Pseudomonas aeruginosa infection
  - Pseudomonas oryzihabitans infection
  - Pseudomonas stutzeri infection
- Pseudomongolism
- Pseudomyxoma peritonei

Pseudoo–Pseudo-Z

- Pseudoobstruction idiopathic intestinal
- Pseudopapilledema
- Pseudopapilledema blepharophimosis hand anomalies
- Pseudopelade of Brocq
- Pseudopolycythaemia
- Pseudoprogeria syndrome
- Pseudo-torch syndrome
- Pseudotumor cerebri
- Pseudo-Turner syndrome
- Pseudovaginal perineoscrotal hypospadias
- Pseudoxanthoma elasticum, dominant form
- Pseudoxanthoma elasticum, recessive form
- Pseudoxanthoma elasticum
- Pseudo-Zellweger syndrome

=== Psi–Psy ===
- Psittacosis
- Psoriasis
- Psoriatic arthritis
- Psoriatic rheumatism
- Psychogenic polydipsia
- Psychophysiologic disorders
- Psychosis

== Pt ==
- Pterygia mental retardation facial dysmorphism
- Pterygium colli
- Pterygium colli mental retardation digital anomalies
- Pterygium of the eye
- Pterygium syndrome antecubital
- Pterygium syndrome multiple dominant type
- Pterygium syndrome X linked
- Pterygium syndrome, multiple
- Ptosis
- Ptosis coloboma mental retardation
- Ptosis coloboma trigonocephaly
- Ptosis strabismus diastasis
- Ptosis strabismus ectopic pupils

== Pu ==
=== Pub ===
- Pubic lice
- Puerperal fever

=== Pul ===
==== Pulm ====
===== Pulmo =====
====== Pulmon ======
- Pulmonar arterioveinous aneurysm
- Pulmonary agenesis
- Pulmonary alveolar proteinosis, congenital
- Pulmonary alveolar proteinosis
- Pulmonary arterio-veinous fistula
- Pulmonary artery agenesis
- Pulmonary artery coming from the aorta
- Pulmonary artery familial dilatation
- Pulmonary atresia with ventricular septal defect
- Pulmonary blastoma
- Pulmonary branches stenosis
- Pulmonary cystic lymphangiectasis
- Pulmonary disease, chronic obstructive
- Pulmonary edema of mountaineers
- Pulmonary fibrosis /granuloma
- Pulmonary hypertension, secondary
- Pulmonary hypertension
- Pulmonary hypoplasia familial primary
- Pulmonary sequestration
- Pulmonary supravalvular stenosis
- Pulmonary surfactant protein B, deficiency of
- Pulmonary valve stenosis
- Pulmonary valves agenesis
- Pulmonary veins stenosis
- Pulmonary veno-occlusive disease
- Pulmonary venous return anomaly
- Pulmonaryatresia intact ventricular septum
- Pulmonic stenosis with Café au lait spot

=== Pun–Pur ===
- Punctate acrokeratoderma freckle like pigmentation
- Punctate inner choroidopathy
- Pure red cell aplasia
- Puretic syndrome
- Purine nucleoside phosphorylase deficiency
- Purpura, Schönlein–Henoch
- Purpura, thrombotic thrombocytopenic
- Purpura
- Purtilo syndrome

== Py ==
- Pyaemia
- Pycnodysostosis
- Pyknoachondrogenesis
- Pyle disease
- Pyelonephritis
- Pyoderma gangrenosum
- Pyomyositis
- Pyridoxine deficit
- Pyrimidinemia familial
- Pyrophobia
- Pyropoikilocytosis
- Pyrosis
- Pyruvate carboxylase deficiency
- Pyruvate decarboxylase deficiency
- Pyruvate dehydrogenase deficiency
- Pyruvate kinase deficiency, liver type
- Pyruvate kinase deficiency, muscle type
- Pyruvate kinase deficiency
