= Dermoid sinus =

Genetic skin condition in dogs

Dermoid sinus is thought to be a genetic skin condition in dogs. It is also known as pilonidal sinus. However, unlike pilonidal sinus in humans, the dermoid sinus in dogs is a neural tube defect. Dermoid sinus is sometimes also confused with dermoid cyst (a teratoma).

A dermoid sinus is rare in dogs and cats. It can appear as single or multiple lumps on the dorsal midline. The sinus is caused in the embryonic stage of development. In normal development, the neural tube from which the spine develops separates from the skin. In the case of a dermoid sinus, this separation has not fully taken place. The result is that in some cases, the dermoid sinus remains connected to the animal's spinal cord; in other cases, the sinus terminates in a "blind sac" that is less dangerous to remove. Histologically, the dermoid sinus contains hair follicles, sebaceous glands, and sweat glands. If the sinus becomes infected, it can result in meningitis and myelitis, symptoms of which are spinal pain, rigidity, and fever. In serious cases, the condition can be life-threatening.

The dermoid sinus gene is believed by some to be recessive, meaning that the animal must receive one defective gene from each parent in order to develop the condition. Where one parent carries the gene and the other does not, the offspring remain carriers and can continue to pass the defective gene on to their offspring in turn. Others believe that the dermoid sinus condition is more appropriately characterized as polygenic, involving multiple genes. In any case, because of the genetic nature of this potentially dangerous condition, most breeders and veterinarians advise against breeding animals that have a dermoid sinus, or have a parent that is known to carry the gene.

Surgical excision is the only remedy for this condition, with veterinary surgeons removing abnormal tissue and closing any connections to the spine, In some cases, regrowth of the sinus occurs. A variety of tests, such as a myelogram or a fistulogram may be undertaken to determine how deep the sinus goes. Other, more basic tests, such as a complete blood count, biochemical profile, and urinalysis can be performed to determine if infection or other problems exist. Computed tomography scans and magnetic resonance imaging may be undertaken to determine if neurological signs exist as a result of the sinus.

Breeds known to be affected include Rhodesian Ridgeback, Phu Quoc Ridgeback, and Thai Ridgeback, in which it is hereditary, Kerry Blue Terriers, Shih Tzus and Boxers.
