= Pili bifurcati =

- Specialty: Dermatology

Pili bifurcati is characterized by bifurcation found in short segments along the shafts of several hairs, with each branch of the bifurcation being covered with its own cuticle.

== Signs and symptoms ==
Pili bifurcati is defined by uneven bifurcation of the hair shaft. Every bifurcation forms two distinct parallel branches that eventually unite to form a single shaft. Each branch of the subsequent bifurcations is entirely encased in its own cuticle.

== Causes ==
The etiology of pili bifurcati is a temporary duplication of the papilla tip that occurs during the anagen phase. This temporary production results in two full shafts that emerge from a single pilary canal within the same follicular matrix.

== Diagnosis ==
Hair shaft analysis and trichogram are used to make the diagnosis. Reduced hair shaft caliber and a high percentage of dystrophic anagen hairs may be seen in the first. Patients with protein deficits can have hypopigmentation and telogen effluvium. Hair shafts studied under light microscopy reveals the distinctive bifurcations.

== See also ==
- List of cutaneous conditions
- Pili multigemini – multiple hairs growing from the same source.
- Ringed hair
