= Perisylvian syndrome =

- Other names: Bilateral perisylvian polymicrogyria
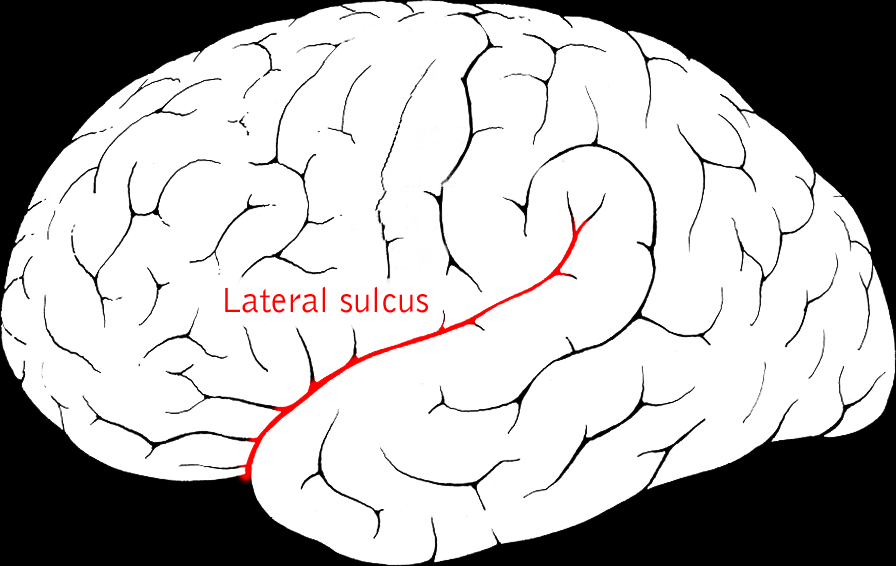
- Lateral sulcus (Sylvian fissure)
- Specialty: Neurology

Perisylvian syndrome is a rare neurological disease characterized by damage to the sylvian fissure (lateral sulcus), an area in the brain involved in language and speech. The main symptoms are difficulty chewing and swallowing, low muscle tone in the face and tongue, speech and language development disorders, and epilepsy. These symptoms are also often accompanied by difficulties with mobility and intellectual disabilities.

The history evidence and exact underlying cause of this condition has not been sourced by researchers and other experts. Due to its low prevalence and possible misdiagnosis, there is a lack of definitive information. Many articles postulate several sources for causes, such as stroke and external trauma to the head, causing damage to the fissure and resulting in malfunctioning structures that interact with it. Other articles have included explorations in diagnosis and treatment of symptoms, with some exploratory treatment of the fissure damage. The fissure has become a subject of increasing focus due to the significant anatomical structures that cross it.

It is not to be confused with congenital bilateral perisylvian syndrome (CBPS), which is a form of PS that occurs in embryo and appears in birth and childhood

== Signs and symptoms ==
Due to the relationships the fissure has with multiple vital parts of the brain, damage to any one of them can alter the function of the adjacent cortical regions, disrupting the connection between the cognitive, neural, and muscular networks.

It is unclear if these are long-term or short term in duration, but symptoms are implied to be permanent without medical intervention.

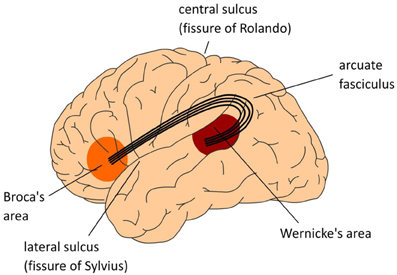
Site of speech processes that sit on the Perisylvian fissure

=== Speech ===
Trauma to the fissure near the temporal lobe can cause speech issues. Wernicke's area is located on the superior temporal gyrus next to the end of the Sylvian fissure that sits towards the back of the head. This area is part of the language system, and has a major function in the ability to recall speech sounds associated with written letters. Damage to this area can cause anomia, a language disorder that makes it difficult to locate words, and phonemic paraphasia.

The sylvian surface on the frontal lobe (located deep in the sylvian fissure) contains a bundle of fibers called the arcuate fasciculus (AF) that curve around the fissure, and comes from Broca's area, which is involved in language production and comprehension. Damage to this nerve bundle can cause conditions such as Broca's aphasia and expressive aphasia.

=== Auditory processing disorders ===
Damage to the fissure near the temporal lobe may also cause auditory processing disorders due to the disruption in the neural pathway in the area of the temporal lobe the fissure sits in.

=== Epilepsy ===
Epilepsy is common in studies related to congenital (pre-birth), bilateral (both sides), and unilateral (one side) Perisylvian syndrome. Kuzniecky et al. reported 90% of Perisylvian syndrome cases with epilepsy.

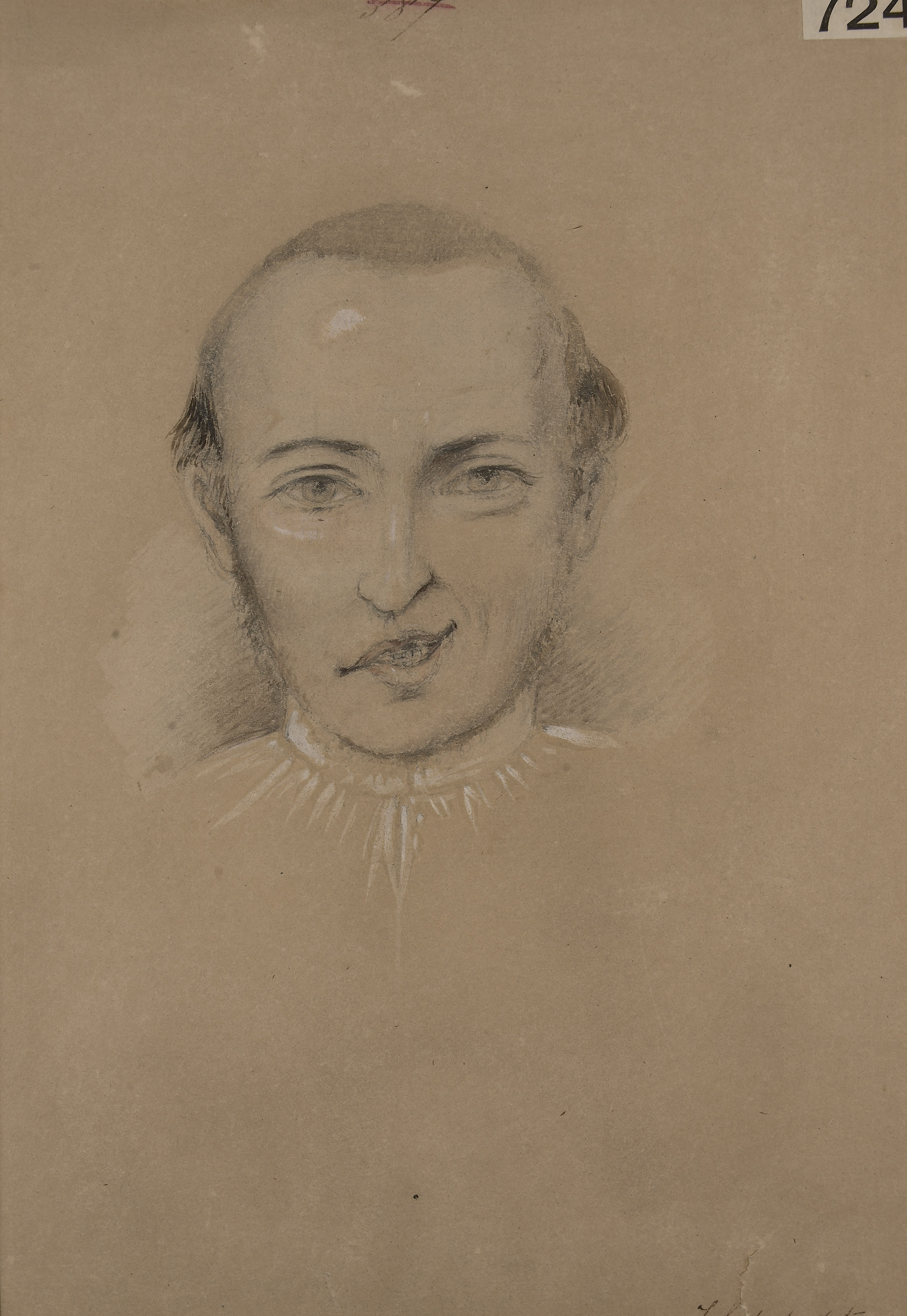
Man with facial paralysis on his right side

=== Facial paralysis ===
While the Sylvian fissure does not directly connect to the cranial nerves, previous exploratory dissection reveals that the middle cerebral artery (specifically the M2 segment) runs through the deep insular tissue. Damage to the Sylvian tissue may cause damage or malfunction to the arterial supply of the M2 branch and create an infarction resulting in hemiparesis (unilateral paralysis). A study by Mavili E et al. found that 89% of patients presented with psychomotor retardation, 84% with speech disorders, and 57% with cerebral palsy.

== Cause and prevention ==
There are not many definitive pre-occurring conditions and risk factors that lead to the following causes of Perisylvian syndrome. Though the definitive cause is still being explored, it has been well established that the condition cannot be spread from person to person. One study proposes several of the following causes that may create trauma to the fissure:

- Cerebral hypoperfusion – a condition where there is inadequate blood flow to the brain, which can be caused by smoking, blood pressure disorders, stroke, and sepsis
- Stroke – a condition where blood flow to the brain is disrupted, causing brain cells to die off
- Possible injury during neuronal migration in fetal development (See: congenital bilateral perisylvian syndrome)
- Brain lesions – an area of damaged brain tissues from injury or disease

Other studies have also explored its link to genetics.

In the majority of cases; however, the condition appears sporadically.

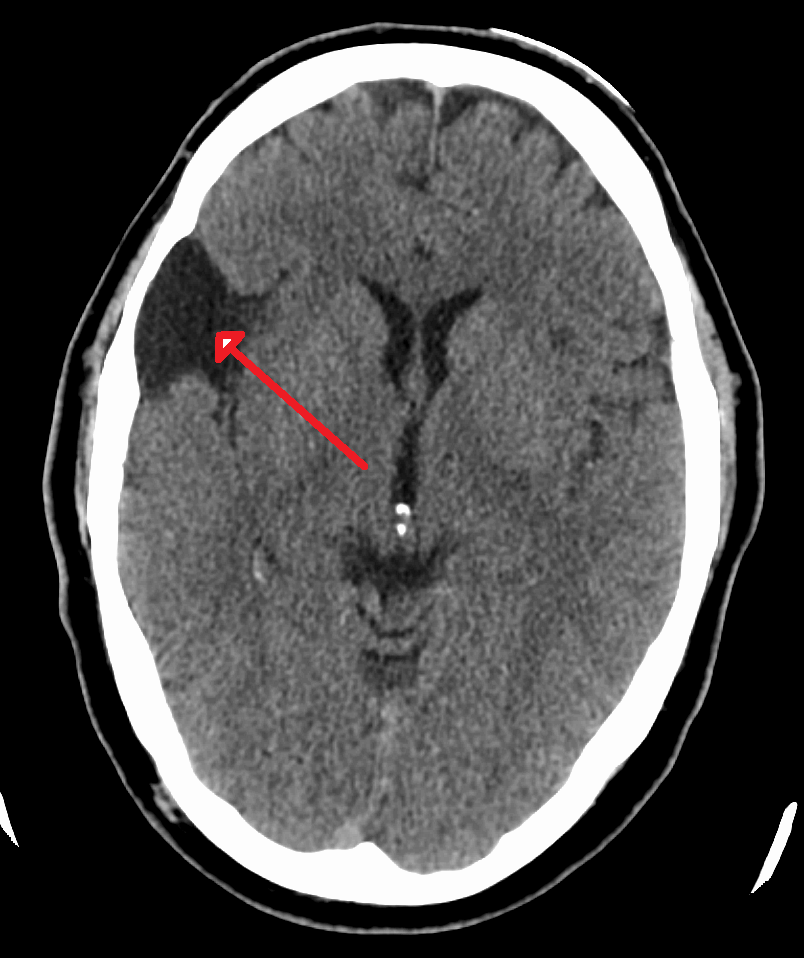
Image of arachnoid cyst

=== Cysts ===
Arachnoid cysts represent <1% of intracranial lesions, with the Sylvian fissure being the most common location, most predominant in males on the left side.

Cysts are often discovered incidentally during imaging, and most common associated symptoms are headaches, seizures, and motor deficit due to the pressure the cyst applies to the temporal lobe.

== Pathophysiology and mechanism ==
The Sylvian fissure is the most prominent crease on the brain. It sits on the lateral hemisphere of the brain, separating the temporal and frontal lobe. It extends into the parietal lobe, and sits perpendicular to the central sulcus, a prominent groove on top of the brain. It also sits in the insula, a part of the brain involved in various functions such as decision making, social emotions, empathy, pain processing, interception, auditory processing. The site is also closely associated with a major cranial artery known as the middle cerebral artery, a vital and the largest branch of the internal carotid artery that is responsible for blood supply to the brain's frontal, temporal, and parietal lobes. It is made up of four branches that extend throughout the brain tissue, labeled as M1, M2, M3, and M4.

In most cases of Perisylvian syndrome, the condition exists congenitally and is not typically developed throughout one's lifetime without some sort of significant trauma to the head, causing lesions, pressure, or tissue death, and trickles down to the rest of neural processing in other vital functions of the brain. Once neural processes weaken in these areas, the brain is not able to send signals to its respective parts of the body.

CT scan with MCA infarction

== Diagnosis ==
A neurologist would be seen if a diagnosis is desired. Considering the symptoms, a diagnosis may be suggested with visual evidence of the following:

=== CT scan ===
Early signs of the middle cerebral artery occlusion (MCA) can be found upon discovery of a hyperdense MCA on a brain CT scan. It appears with increased amplitude of the M1 segment, or with increased density in the MCA and branches inside the Sylvian fissure.

=== Brain MRI ===
An MRI may show the appearance of "bat wings" – an open fissure on both sides of the brain typically seen in glutaric aciduria type 1, a rare metabolic disorder that inhibits the breakdown of amino acids.

=== Angiography ===
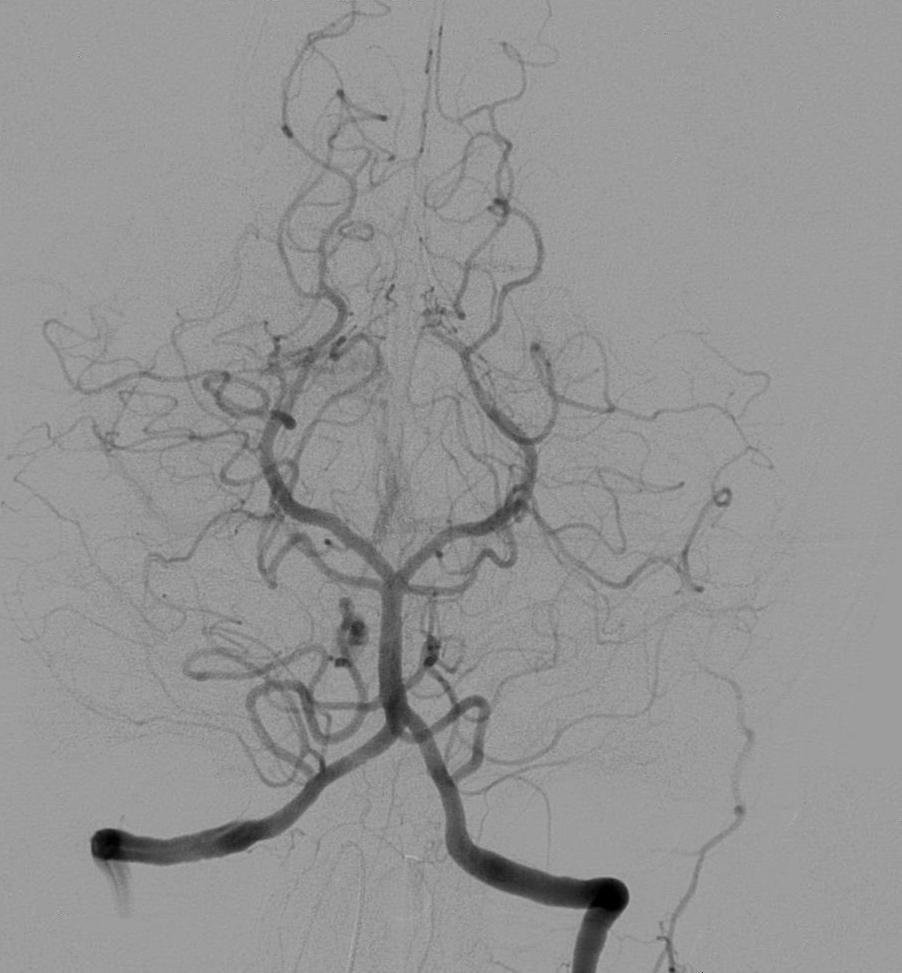
image of cerebral angiography

The Sylvian triangle is an important landmark on lateral cerebral angiograms. It is made up of three lines: a straight line that follows the loops of the M2 segment, paired with a large trunk of the MCA anterior, and the first ascending insular branch of the M2 segment posterior.

=== History of aneurysms ===
Bifurcation (division into two parts) or trifurcation (division into three parts) of the M1 segment, located in the Sylvian fissure sphenoidal compartment, may create intracranial saccular aneurysms from the MCA. (This occurs in 22% of people).

These methods are not definitive, however, when investigating this condition. It is more likely for neurologists to diagnose a separate neurological condition based on the symptoms and patient history, and conclude the possible diagnosis as PS using the above visual evidence.

== Treatment and prognosis ==
Data in prognosis is very limited for this syndrome. However, neurological conditions affecting multiple parts of the brain generally have had a wide range of recovery timelines. In the case of Perisylvian Syndrome, there have been some invasive exploratory surgical interventions to improve symptoms:

=== Aneurysms ===
Possible exploratory treatments include embolization techniques, microsurgical techniques, and hybrid techniques involving multiple procedures.

=== Inside-out dissection ===
General principle for surgery: the patient lays in supine position with the head rotated away at 30%. There are three spaces to consider with different challenges for each.

In the superficial ocular compartment, the best point to begin is at the anterior sylvian point, below the pars traignularis, a triangular shape in the frontal lobe responsible for speech production and language processing. Then, a sharp incision of the outer arachnoid membrane is created on front side of superficial Sylvian veins. Then, the most visible veins are moved away from the temporal lobe. Finally, dissection of arachnoid bands (thick tissue in the arachnoid membrane) that connects brain tissue to brain tissue, and veins to veins, exposes the Sylvian membrane.

Middle cranial fossa

Following this, another dissection of the outside sylvian membrane occurs to expose the compartment, then dissection of deep arachnoid bands, mainly brain tissue to brain and artery connection to brain tissue.

Lastly, in the deepest compartment, the M2 artery segment must be identified, located deeply on lateral insular surface.

=== Cysts ===
Options for treatment and management may include conservative and surgical alternatives such as endoscopies, microsurgical craniotomy, and shunting. Neuroendoscopic fenestration is best initial procedure for middle cranial fossa arachnoid cysts.

=== Medication ===
While medication cannot treat the condition, it may treat some associated symptoms:

One woman with bilateral Perisylvian syndrome was treated for her epilepsy with lamotrigine and oxcarbazepine and was in remission for eight years. When the condition reappeared, treatment included lamotrigine and levetiracetam, and resulted in significant clinical improvement.

== Epidemiology ==
With the condition occurring sporadically, there is minimal linkage to explore populations at risk. However, some studies report that Perisylvian syndrome may be genetically linked, as it may be passed from parent to child as some families may have many affected members. It is unknown whether this is autosomal recessive, dominant, or X-linked. Some studies also suggest that those who have had previous significant head trauma may be at risk.

== Recent research ==
In 2017, a study conducted by Freri et al. explored a new surgical treatment to improve symptoms of epilepsy in the Perisylvian region for 16 pediatric patients who were resistant to medication. The median age during time of surgery was 12 years old. Prior to the procedure, patients completed a preoperative assessment, including analysis of clinical history, EEG monitoring, high-resolution MRI, and a cognitive/neuropsychological evaluation. The procedure was performed with the goal of removing the epileptogenic zone, a part of the brain where seizure activity occurs. It was found post-operatively (39 months) that seizure outcome improved satisfactory in 69% of patients, with seven being seizure-free, and two free from disabling seizures. Cognition improved in 38% of patients as well.

In 2020, a study conducted by Steriade et al. explored the relationship between encephalitis and seizure patterns in patients with drug-resistant epilepsy. Using 17 patients with encephalitis, and 17 control patients with drug-resistant epilepsy and no history of encephalitis, a stereotactic EEG was used to locate the onset and spread of seizures. The findings concluded that there were four distinct patterns of onset seizures, with 59% of the cohort having a Perisylvian onset. This was unique to the group with a history of encephalitis, and may indicate that encephalitic-related damage may cause an increase in vulnerability to damage at the Perisylvian fissure.
