= Pili annulati =

- Other names: Ringed hair disease
- Specialty: Medical genetics

Pili annulati (also known as "ringed hair") is a genetic trait in which the hair seems "banded" by alternating segments of light and dark color when seen in reflected light.

Pili annulati manifests during infancy or at birth. The clinical manifestation varies. Usually, the hair appears shiny and banded. Pili annulati usually just affects the scalp but can be present in other areas.

Pili annulati may be sporadic or inherited in an autosomal dominant fashion. Pili annulati can be diagnosed based on light microscopy or trichoscopy. Treatment is not needed.

Pili pseudoannulati is an anomaly of human hair that mimics pili annulati; however, the two differ in that the light bands of pili annulati are caused by internal effects, whereas the bright segments of pili pseudoannulati are caused by reflection and refraction of light by flattened, twisted surfaces of hair.

== Signs and symptoms ==
Pili annulati might show up during infancy or at birth. Within the same patient, the clinical manifestation may vary at different parts of the scalp or even within the same afflicted hair.

The clinical examination typically finds the hair to be shiny and banded, with an occasional odd shimmering texture or even frizzy look. As the hair develops, the amount of white bands tends to diffuse.

Higher hair fragility is not usually linked to pili annulati. A small percentage of cases show significant trichorrhexis-nodosa-like hair fracturing and breakage together with enhanced sensitivity at the light band level.

Although pili annulati is mostly restricted to the hair on the scalp, it can also affect hair in the pubic, axillary, and beard areas.

== Causes ==
Pili annulati are inherited in an autosomal dominant pattern that exhibits varied expression. There has also been sporadic cases reported. There is documentation of a case of pili annulati linked to a mutation in RECQL4, which causes Rothmund-Thomson syndrome.

== Diagnosis ==
A distinctive look with alternating bright and dark stripes in the hair shaft is revealed by light microscopy. In light microscopy, the dark bands correlate to white bands in reflected light, in trichoscopy, and macroscopically. A normal medulla with clusters of sporadic, air-filled cavities within the cortex of the hair shafts is visible under transmission electron microscopy of the affected hairs. A "cobblestoned" and fluted cuticle is shown via scanning electron microscopy.

Similar to other illnesses of the hair shaft, trichoscopy is a quick and easy way for practitioners to diagnose pili annulati without having to remove hairs.

== Treatment ==
Since pili annulati is a benign illness for which individuals never seek medical attention, treatment is frequently not necessary.

== See also ==
- Pili torti
- Pili bifurcati
