= Pili multigemini =

- Other names: Pili gemini
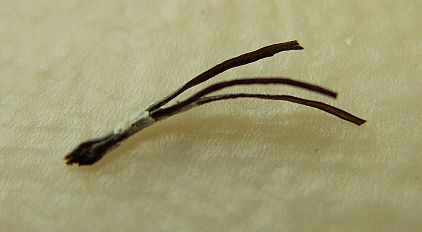
- An extracted pilus multigeminus with three distinct hairs growing from the same source.
- Specialty: Dermatology

Pili multigemini, is a malformation characterized by the presence of bifurcated or multiple divided hair matrices and papillae, giving rise to the formation of multiple hair shafts within the individual follicles.

It is important to differentiate it from compound hairs. Compound hairs have separate hair follicles which merge in the superficial layers of the dermis, giving the appearance of multiple hair shafts originating from a single follicle 1.

== Description ==
The name describes a condition where several separate hair fibers bunch together and emerge from the skin through a single hair canal. Pathology shows that deep in the skin several dermal papillae are closely situated with each producing a fiber, but these separate hair follicle bulbs combine into one hair canal towards the skin surface. Folliculitis can sometimes be associated with this condition.

== Treatment ==
Electrology will permanently remove pili multigemini. Depilating laser treatment has been suggested to improve symptomatic pili multigemini.

== See also ==
- Pili bifurcati
- List of cutaneous conditions
