= Pyknoachondrogenesis =

- Other names: Association of skeletal defects resembling achondrogenesis with generalized bone sclerosis
- Specialty: Medical genetics
- Complications: Death
- Usual onset: Antenatal
- Types: This condition is a type of osteochondrodysplasia.
- Diagnostic method: X-rays, Ultrasound
- Prevention: none
- Treatment: none
- Prognosis: poor
- Frequency: rare, only 5 cases have been described in medical literature
- Deaths: 5

Pyknoachondrogenesis is a very rare, fatal, presumably autosomal recessive genetic disorder characterized by symptoms similar to those shown by patients with achondrogenesis alongside severely osteoclerotic bones and early death. The findings that can be seen in patients with this condition include hydrops fetalis, palpebral edemas, low-set ears, abdomen prominence, short neck, large head, depressed nasal bridge, shortening and widening of the trunk, severe short-limbed dwarfism, craniofacial hyperostosis, agenesis of the pubic bones, hypoplasia of the pelvic bones and ischium, poor (sometimes absent) ossification of the vertebrae and sacrum, webbing of the neck, and shortening of a long bone and the ribs. Pregnancies of babies with this condition generally aren't compatible with life and they end up in miscarriage, stillbirth, or in neonatal death (that is, death soon after birth). Only 5 cases from Italy and the United States, respectively, have been described in medical literature.
