= Acro-oto-radial syndrome =

Acro-oto radial syndrome
- Other names: Pseudopallidema blepharophimosis hand anomalies syndrome
- Specialty: Medical genetics
- Prevention: none
- Prognosis: Medium to Good
- Frequency: very rare, only 4 cases have been reported in medical literature.
- Deaths: -

Acro-oto-radial syndrome, also known as Pseudopapilledema blepharophimosis hand anomalies syndrome, is a very rare hereditary disorder which is characterized by pseudopapilledema, hearing loss, cranio-facial dysmorphisms and hand/foot anomalies. Unlike other genetic syndromes, people with this syndrome don't exhibit intellectual disabilities. Only 4 cases have been reported in medical literature.

== Description ==
People with this disorder often have the following symptoms:

- Pseudopapilledema
- Hearing loss
- Microcephaly
- Down-slanting palpebral fissures
- Broad nose
- Micrognathia
- Ear malformations
- Generalized shortness of digits
- Thenar and hypothenar eminence hypoplasia
- Hallux varus
- Foot syndactyly

== Cases ==
The following is the list of all cases of acro-oto-radial syndrome reported in medical literature:

- 1991: Paes-Alves et al. describes 3 affected members of 2 consanguineous sibships from the same large family in Bahia, Brazil with the symptoms mentioned above. They propose this case to be part of a novel autosomal recessive malformation syndrome.
- 1997: Bertola et al. describes a 23-year-old patient born to consanguineous parents with the symptoms mentioned above. They conclude that this is also part of the same syndrome reported by Paes-Alves and suggest a name for the syndrome (acro-oto-radial syndrome)
