= Pilotto syndrome =

- Other names: Cleft lip and palate, congenital heart disease, scoliosis, short stature, and intellectual disability

Pilotto syndrome is a rare syndrome which affects the face, heart, and back. The syndrome can cause a cleft lip and palate, scoliosis, and intellectual disability. The Office of Rare Diseases and National Institutes of Health have classified this syndrome as affecting less than 200,000 people in the United States.
