= Kinking hair =

- Other names: Acquired progressive kinking of hair
- Specialty: Dermatology

Kinking hair, or acquired progressive kinking of hair, is a skin condition primarily reposted in postpubescent males with androgenetic alopecia, presenting with gradual curling and darkening of the frontal, temporal, auricular, and vertex hairs which, under the microscope, show kinks and twists with or without longitudinal grooving.

== Signs and symptoms ==
Kinking hair is characterized by acquired curling of the hair. The hair might appear frizzy or lusterless. Increased hair shedding is usually the most problematic symptom.

== Causes ==
The cause of hair kinking remains a mystery. It has been suggested as a potential mechanism that hair kinking is a hair cycle disease associated with dysregulation in the inner root sheath of the hair bulb and the shortening of anagen hairs.

== Diagnosis ==
The diagnostic criteria for kinking hair is as follows:

1. an acquired, bounded patch of woolly, dull hair in the frontal, temporal, or parietal regions that is not associated with prior trauma. Hair that is twisted, tortuous, and uneven, with the initial twist showing 2-4 cm after the hair emerges.
2. A periodic decline in the diameter of the hair shaft, observed under optical microscopy, with flattened and expanded sections alternating.
3. A spindle-shaped widening with sporadic fractures, a partial twisting of the hair on its longitudinal axis with a 180-degree rotation, and an increased number of cuticular cells per diameter in the twisted sections were observed using scanning electron microscopy.

== See also ==
- List of cutaneous conditions
