= Congenital bilateral perisylvian syndrome =

- Other names: CBPS
- This condition is inherited in an X-linked dominant manner.
- Specialty: Neurology

Congenital bilateral perisylvian syndrome (CBPS) is a rare neurological disease characterized by paralysis of certain facial muscles and epileptic seizures.

== Signs and symptoms ==
Signs and symptoms of CBPS typically appear in infancy or at birth, but can appear later in childhood. These include facial diplegia (paralysis on both sides), facial muscle spasms, pseudobulbar palsy, dysarthria (difficulty speaking), difficulty chewing, dysphagia (difficulty swallowing), epilepsy, and intellectual disability. Epileptic seizures in individuals with CBPS are different between individuals and can vary between episodes.

== Pathophysiology ==
Though the underlying cause of CBPS is unknown, it is thought to arise from improper migration of neuroblasts (neuronal stem cells) to the cerebral cortex in the embryonic brain. This causes the layers of the cerebral cortex to not form properly, and too many small folds (gyri) to form on the surface of the brain. This condition is called bilateral perisylvian polymicrogyria. The sulci, deep grooves on the brain, may also not form correctly. Cranial nerves are affected and cause muscle paralysis and spasms in the face and throat.

== Diagnosis ==
Several disorders may appear similar to CBPS and need to be distinguished in the process of diagnosing CBPS. These include pachygyria, double cortex syndrome, and lissencephaly, all of which are classified along with CBPS as neuronal migration disorders. Diagnostic tests for CBPS include electroencephalograms, CT scanning, and magnetic resonance imaging.

== Treatment ==
CBPS is commonly treated with anticonvulsant therapy to reduce seizures. Therapies include anticonvulsant drugs, adrenocorticotropic hormone therapy, and surgical therapy, including focal corticectomy and callosotomy. Special education, speech therapy, and physical therapy are also used to help children with intellectual disability due to CBPS.

== Epidemiology ==
Males and females have an equal chance of having CBPS.
