= Parastremmatic dwarfism =

- Other names: Parastremmatic dysplasia
- Parastremmatic dwarfism has an autosomal dominant pattern of inheritance

Parastremmatic dwarfism is a rare bone disease that features severe dwarfism, thoracic kyphosis (a type of scoliosis that affects the upper back), a distortion and twisting of the limbs, contractures of the large joints, malformations of the vertebrae and pelvis, and incontinence. The disease was first reported in 1970 by Leonard Langer and associates; they used the term parastremmatic from the Greek parastremma, or distorted limbs, to describe it. On X-rays, the disease is distinguished by a "flocky" or lace-like appearance to the bones. The disease is congenital, which means it is apparent at birth. It is caused by a mutation in the TRPV4 gene, located on chromosome 12 in humans. The disease is inherited in an autosomal dominant manner.

== Presentation ==
Parastremmatic dwarfism is apparent at birth, with affected infants usually being described as "stiff", or as "twisted dwarfs" when the skeletal deformities and appearance of dwarfism further present themselves. Skeletal deformities usually develop in the sixth to twelfth month of an infant's life. The deformities may be attributed to osteomalacia, a lack of bone mineralization.

Parastremmatic Dwarfism is further characterised by short stature, bowing of extremeties and further neuroskeletal dysplasia.

== Genetics ==
The location of genes on chromosome 12

Parastremmatic dwarfism is caused by a missense mutation (where one amino acid is replaced by another in a gene sequence) in the TRPV4 gene, located on the long arm of human chromosome 12, at 12q24.11. The mutation is in exon 11 of the gene, and is labelled R594H; this means that the codon (the code for an amino acid molecule) for arginine was erroneously substituted by a codon for histidine at position 594 in that exon. This same mutation in the TRVP4 gene is known to cause the Kozlowski type of spondylometaphyseal dysplasia.

Parastremmatic dwarfism is inherited in an autosomal dominant manner, which means that the defective gene responsible for the disease is located on an autosome (chromosome 12 is an autosome), and one copy of the defective gene is sufficient to cause the disorder when inherited from a parent who also has the disorder.

Parastremmatic Dwarfism results from mutations within the N-ankyrin domain of TRPV4, which has been identified to be involved in regulation of the TRPV4 calcium ion channel. This influx of calcium may be responsible for neuronal cell death, as well as affecting levels of circulating growth hormones.

Parastremmatic Dwarfism is a very rare disorder, and as of 2011, only 5 people were diagnosed worldwide. As such, functional analysis has proved elusive at this time.
