= Polydactyly-myopia syndrome =

Polydactyly -myopia syndrome
- Other names: Czeizel-Brooser syndrome
- Specialty: Medical genetics
- Symptoms: Polydactyly with progressive myopia
- Complications: Vision impairment
- Prevention: none
- Prognosis: Medium
- Frequency: very rare, only 9 cases have been reported in medical literature
- Deaths: -

Polydactyly-myopia syndrome, also known as Czeizel-Brooser syndrome, is a very rare genetic disorder which is characterized by post-axial polydactyly on all 4 limbs and progressive myopia. Additional symptoms include bilateral congenital inguinal hernia and undescended testes. It has only been described in nine members of a 4-generation Hungarian family in the year 1986. This disorder is inherited in an autosomal dominant manner.
