= Parathyroid neoplasm =

- Specialty: Oncology

A parathyroid neoplasm is a tumor of the parathyroid gland.

Types include:

- Parathyroid adenoma
- Parathyroid carcinoma
