= Proliferating trichilemmal cyst =

- Other names: Pilar tumor, proliferating follicular cystic neoplasm, proliferating pilar tumor, and proliferating trichilemmal tumor
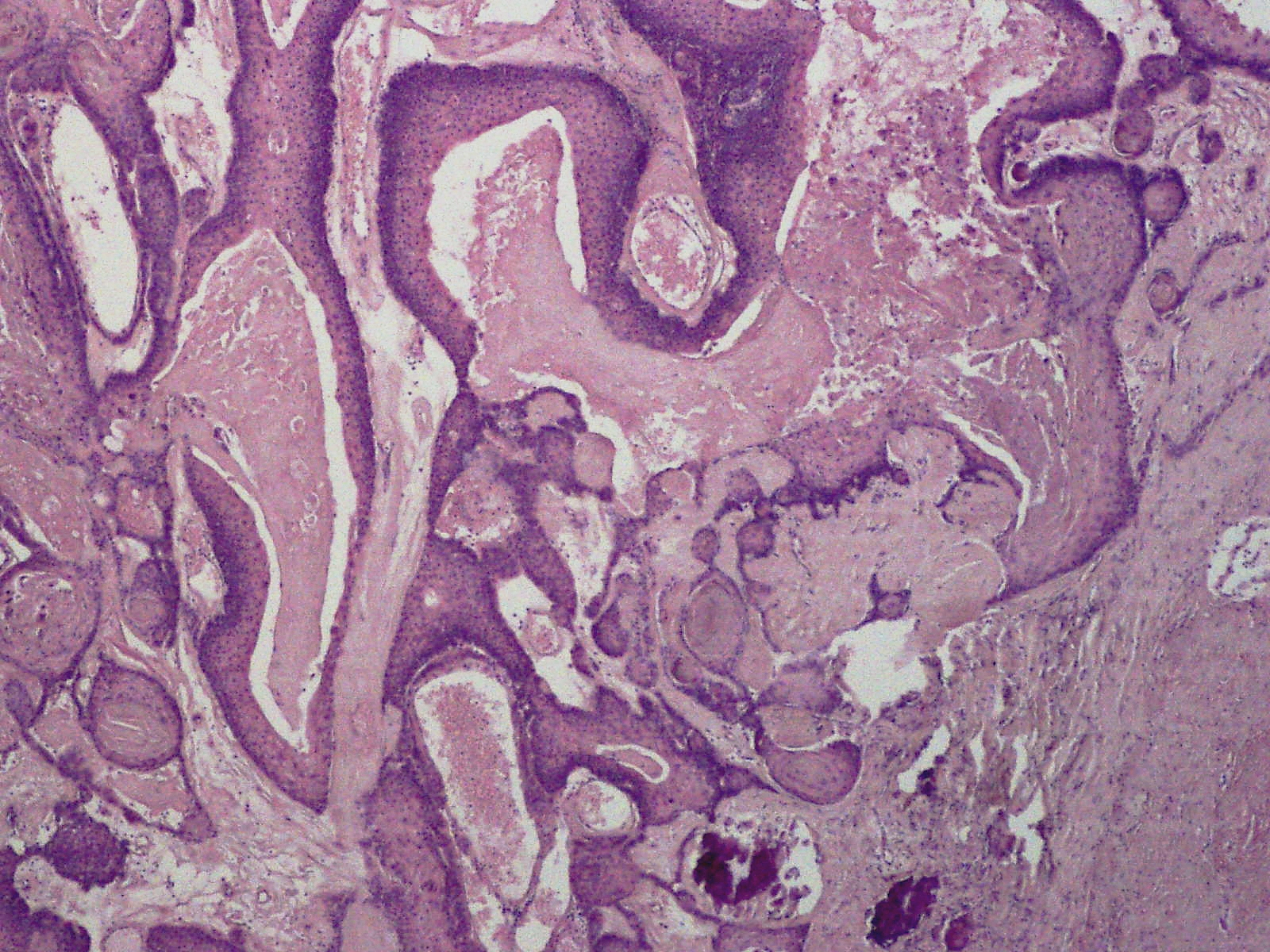
- Proliferating tricholemmal (pilar) cyst
- Specialty: Dermatology

Proliferating trichilemmal cysts (also known as a pilar tumor, proliferating follicular cystic neoplasm, proliferating pilar tumor, and proliferating trichilemmal tumor) is a cutaneous condition, characterized by proliferations of squamous cells forming scroll-like structures.

== Signs and symptoms ==
The tumors, which are typically found in regions like the scalp with a high density of hair follicles, can be solid or solid cystic. Proliferating trichilemmal cyst frequently manifests clinically as a subcutaneous nodule that gradually grows into a big nodular mass. Rapid growth in some cases may be a sign of malignant development into cancer.

== Diagnosis ==
Histologically, Proliferating trichilemmal cysts are distinguished by trichilemmal keratinization, which is the sudden change from nucleated epithelium to anucleated keratinized cells without a granular layer. The differential diagnosis include trichilemmal cyst and Turban tumor.

== Treatment ==
Surgical excision is the treatment of choice for proliferating trichilemmal cysts.

== Epidemiology ==
Proliferating trichilemmal cysts make up 0.1% of all skin tumors. Most patients with these tumors are older women, and 90% of patients with these lesions appear on the scalp.

== See also ==
- Trichilemmal cyst
- List of skin conditions
