= Pilonidal disease =

Skin infection between the buttocks

- Other names: Pilonidal cyst, pilonidal abscess, pilonidal sinus, sacrococcygeal fistula
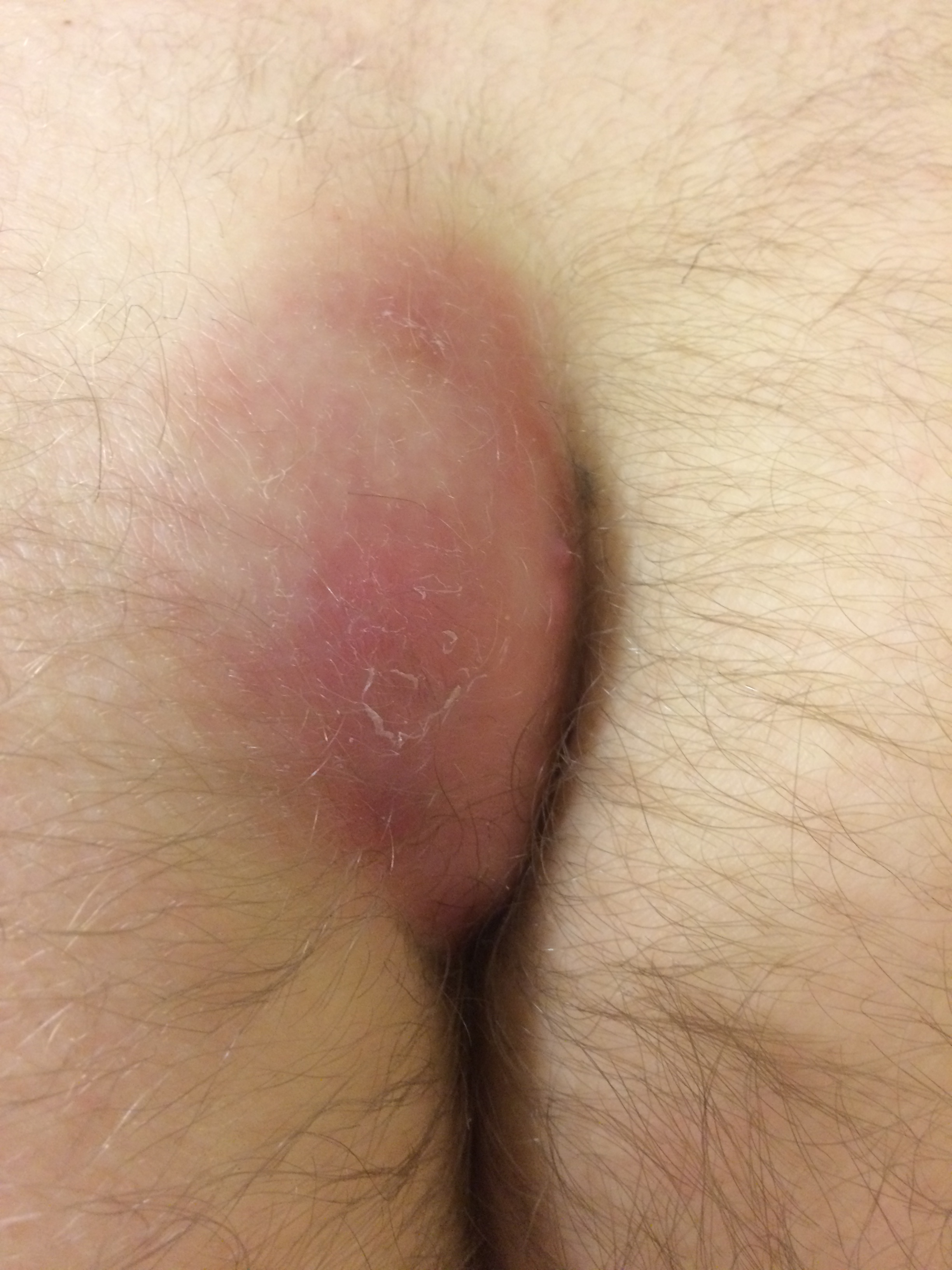
- Acute pilonidal disease in the upper gluteal cleft
- Specialty: General surgery, colorectal surgery
- Symptoms: Pain, swelling, redness, drainage of fluid
- Usual onset: Young adulthood
- Causes: Ingrown hair in the natal cleft
- Risk factors: Obesity, family history, greater amounts of hair (hirsutism), not enough exercise
- Diagnostic method: Based on symptoms and examination
- Differential diagnosis: Hidradenitis suppurativa, perianal abscess, folliculitis
- Prevention: Shaving the area
- Treatment: Incision and drainage, surgical removal
- Frequency: 3 per 10,000 per year

Pilonidal disease is a type of skin infection that typically occurs as a cyst between the cheeks of the buttocks and often at the upper end. Symptoms may include pain, swelling, and redness. There may also be drainage of fluid, but rarely a fever.

Risk factors include obesity, family history, prolonged sitting, greater amounts of hair, and not enough exercise. The underlying mechanism is believed to involve a mechanical process where hair and skin debris get sucked into the subcutaneous tissues through skin openings called pits. Diagnosis is based on symptoms and examination.

If there is an infection, treatment is generally by incision and drainage just off the midline. Shaving the area and laser hair removal may prevent recurrence. More extensive surgery may be required if the disease recurs. Antibiotics are usually not needed. Without treatment, the condition may remain long-term.

About 3 per 10,000 people per year are affected, and it occurs more often in males than females. Young adults are most commonly affected. The term pilonidal means 'nest of hair'. The condition was first described in 1833.

== Signs and symptoms ==
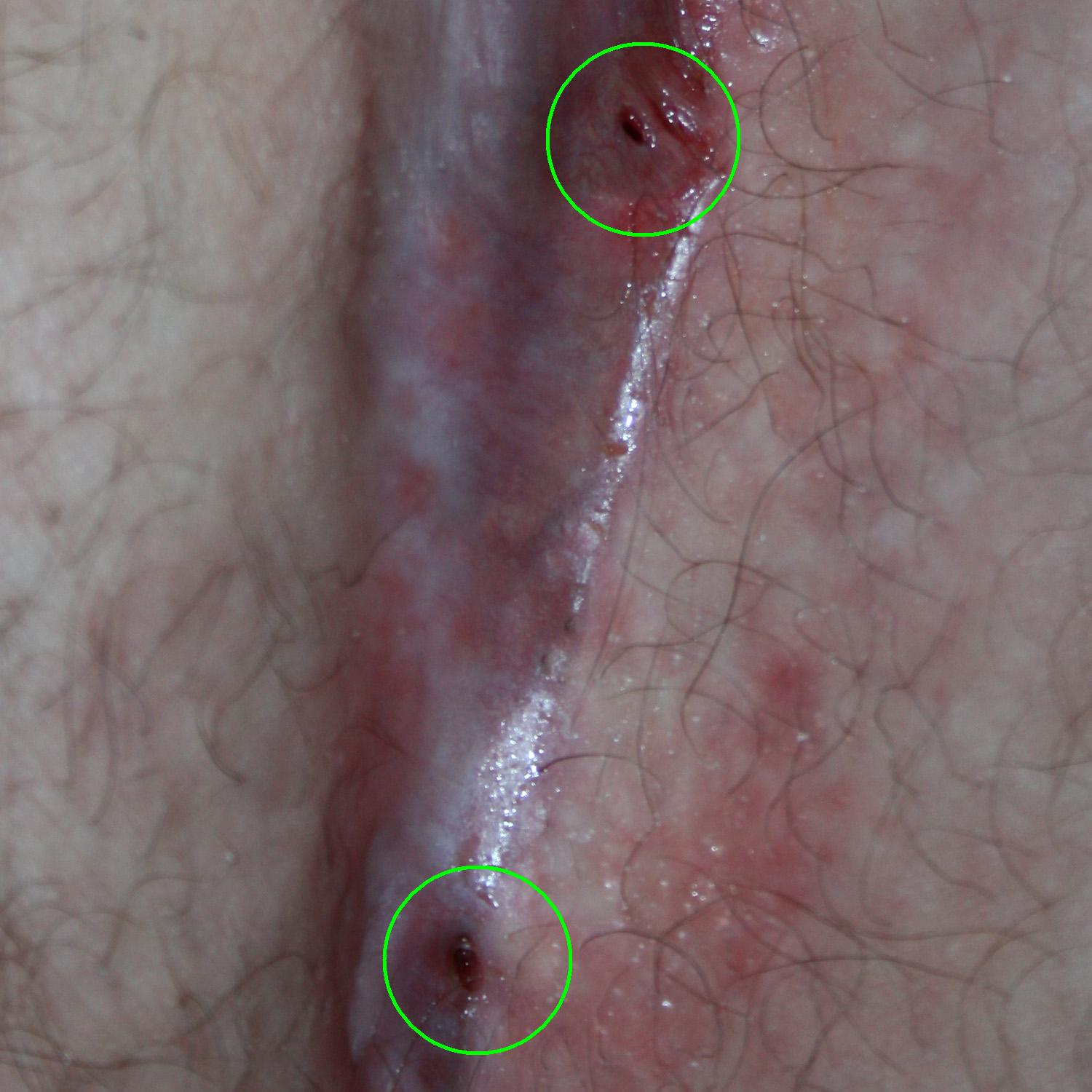
Two pilonidal fistulous openings (circled) that have formed in the gluteal cleft

Pilonidal cysts can be itchy and often very painful, and typically occur between the ages of 15 and 35. Although usually found near the coccyx, the condition can also affect the navel, armpit, the cheek, or the genital region, though these locations are much rarer.

Signs and symptoms may include:

- Intermittent pain/discomfort or swelling above the anus or near the tailbone
- Opaque yellow (purulent) or bloody discharge from the tailbone area
- Unexpected moisture in the tailbone region
- Discomfort sitting on the tailbone, doing sit-ups, or riding a bicycle—any activities that roll over the tailbone area

Some people with a pilonidal cyst will be asymptomatic.

=== Pilonidal sinus ===
Pilonidal sinus (PNS): a sinus tract, or small channel, that may originate from the source of infection and open to the surface of the skin. Material from the cyst drains through the pilonidal sinus. A pilonidal cyst is usually painful, but if it is a draining sinus, the pressure is relieved and the patient might not feel pain.

== Causes ==
Hair insertion is the causative agent of pilonidal cysts. An analysis of 624 patients' cyst hair found that 74% of the hair was rootless, and resembled spiky, razor-cut hair rather than intact body hair. One proposed cause is ingrown hair, although hairs found in pilonidal sinus tracts have more often been found to originate from the head.

Excessive sitting is thought to predispose people to the condition, as sitting increases pressure on the coccygeal region.

Trauma is not believed to cause a pilonidal cyst; however, such an event may result in inflammation of an existing cyst. There are cases where this has occurred months after a localized injury to the area.

Pilonidal cysts may be caused by a congenital pilonidal dimple.

Excessive sweating can also contribute to the formation of a pilonidal cyst: moisture can fill a stretched hair follicle, which helps create a low-oxygen environment that promotes the growth of anaerobic bacteria, often found in pilonidal cysts. The presence of bacteria and low oxygen levels hamper wound healing and exacerbate a developing pilonidal cyst.

== Differential diagnosis ==
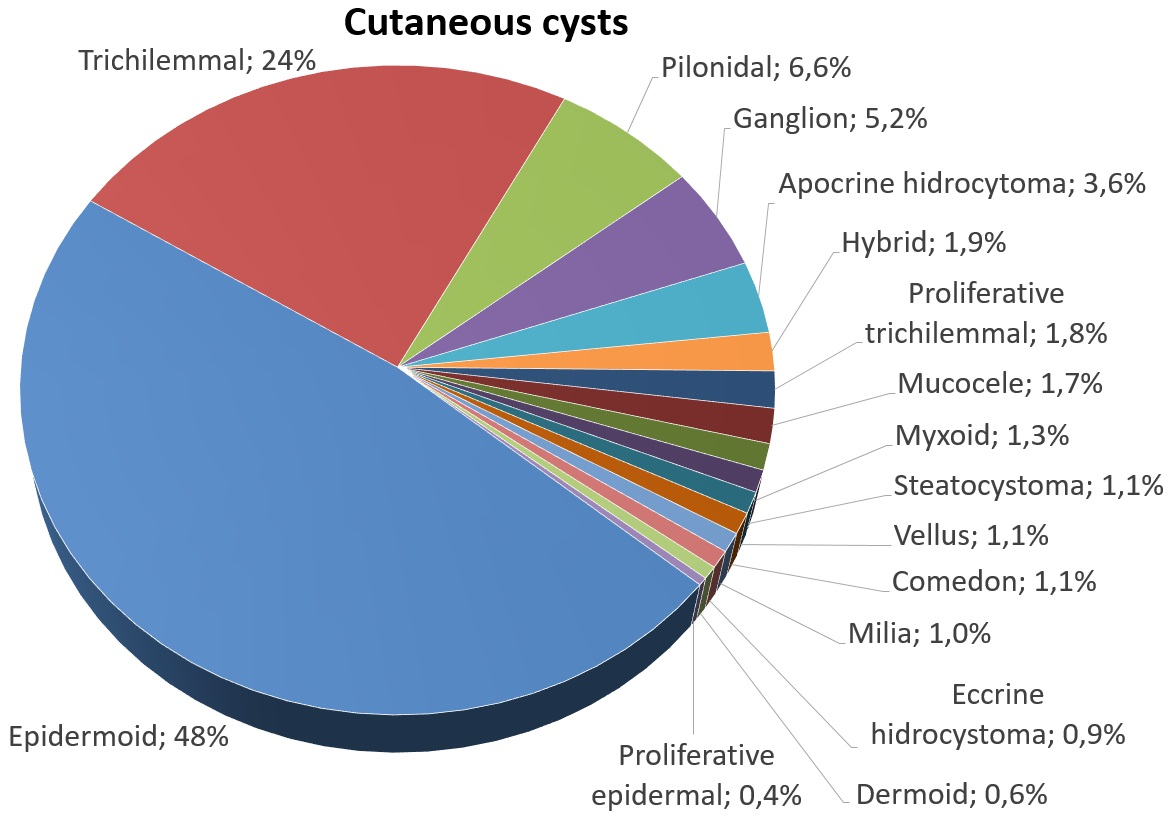
Relative incidence of cutaneous cysts. A pilonidal cyst is labeled near top.

A pilonidal cyst can resemble a dermoid cyst, a kind of teratoma (germ cell tumor). In particular, a pilonidal cyst in the gluteal cleft can resemble a sacrococcygeal teratoma. Correct diagnosis is important because all teratomas require consultation with an oncologist and complete surgical excision, if possible without any spillage.

== Treatment ==
According to the 2024 European Society of Coloproctology (ESCP) Guidelines published in BJS, treatment techniques for PSD include drainage and curettage, phenol application, fibrin glue, laser therapy, marsupialisation, EPSiT, minimally invasive surgery (MIS), pit picking, PRP, and excision with open healing. If there is an infection, treatment is generally by incision and drainage just off the midline because incisions in the midline have a hard time healing well. Following five simple rules has been known to prevent recurring inflammations for some people and avoid surgery: 1. Avoiding chairs and car seats that put pressure on the coccyx; 2. Being of average weight, preferably with low BMI; 3. Keeping the area clean; 4. Keeping the area dry by wearing exclusively cotton garments; 5. Keeping the area completely hair-free, for example, by regularly using an IPL hair removal device.

The evidence for elective treatment of pilonidal sinus disease is poor. The most commonly performed surgery is for the pilonidal sinus complex to be surgically excised with the wound often left open to heal. Post-surgical wound packing may be necessary, and packing typically must be replaced daily for four to eight weeks. In some cases, two years may be required for complete granulation to occur. Sometimes the cyst is resolved via surgical marsupialization.

A 2018 literature review of 740 records of surgeries that included recurrence rates found that primary midline closure surgeries resulted in a 67.9% recurrence rate within 20 years, and recommended that they should be discontinued due to the high recurrence rate. Incision and drainage had a recurrence rate of 25.9% within 2 years, up to 40.2% in 5 years. Phenol treatment has a recurrence rate of 14.1% at 2 years and 40.4% at 5 years. A 2024 study involving 667 people found that, compared with tissue-removing surgery, minor procedures (such as draining and pit-picking) were associated with less pain, fewer complications and a faster recovery. However, minor surgeries were less likely to resolve the condition.

Surgeons can also excise the sinus and repair it with a reconstructive flap technique, such as a "cleft lift" procedure or Z-plasty, usually done under general anesthetic. This approach is especially useful for complicated or recurring pilonidal disease, leaves little scar tissue, and flattens the region between the buttocks, reducing the risk of recurrence. This approach typically results in a more rapid recovery than traditional surgery; however, there are fewer surgeons trained in the cleft lift procedure, and it consequently may not be as accessible to patients, depending on their location. Meta-analysis shows recurrence rates were lower in open healing than with primary closure (RR 0.60, 95% CI 0.42 to 0.87), at the expense of healing time. Pilonidal cysts can recur, and do so more frequently if the surgical wound is sutured in the midline, as opposed to away from the midline, which obliterates the natal cleft and removes the focus of shearing stress. An incision lateral to the intergluteal cleft is therefore preferred, especially given the poor healing of midline incisions in this region. Minimally invasive techniques with no wound and rapid return to full activities have been reported but await double-blind randomized trials.

Another technique is to treat the pilonidal sinus with fibrin glue. This technique is of unclear benefit as of 2017 due to insufficient research. The evidence for any treatment is of low quality, and care must be taken not to overinterpret any study in this field.

Since the 2010s, several minimally invasive techniques have been developed to minimize the impact of surgery on patients and achieve less pain and shorter recovery times.

In some cases, the wounds are left open after surgery to heal naturally instead of being closed with stitches. There are a lot of different dressings and topical agents (creams or lotions) that are available to help these open wounds heal. A 2022 systematic review brought together evidence from 11 studies that compared dressings and topical agents for treating open wounds after surgical treatment for pilonidal sinus of the buttocks. The authors concluded that: platelet rich plasma may help wounds to heal quicker compared to sterile gauze; Lietofix skin repair cream may help wounds to heal by 30 days compared to iodine (which helps to reduce bacteria in the wound); but it is not clear whether hydrogel dressings (designed to keep the wound moist) reduce the time it takes wounds to heal compared with cleaning the wound with iodine.

Endoscopic pilonidal treatment, which uses a small camera to guide the surgeon in removing hair, is a newer method of treatment that has minimal pain and quick healing compared to surgery. A literature review of 497 patients found that the average endoscopic operation time was 34.7 minutes, and the average healing time was 32.9 days. Failure occurred in 8% of patients, who had persistent disease or recurrence.

Current European Society of Coloproctology (ESCP) guidelines (2024) state that laser-based techniques such as sinus laser-assisted closure (SiLaC/SiLaT) may be considered as a minimally invasive treatment option for selected patients with pilonidal disease, reflecting an emerging but still evolving evidence base.

Several randomized controlled trials have compared SiLaC, SiLaT, or other laser ablation techniques with conventional surgical approaches such as excision, curettage, or flap procedures. These studies, generally small and often single-center with short- to mid-term follow-up, report that laser-based techniques may be associated with reduced postoperative pain, shorter operative time, shorter hospital stay, faster wound healing, and improved cosmetic outcomes, with recurrence rates broadly comparable to conventional surgery in the short term.

Systematic reviews and meta-analyses of laser treatment in pilonidal disease report primary healing rates of approximately 80–85% and relatively low complication rates, with recurrence rates varying depending on follow-up duration and study design. A broader meta-analysis of minimally invasive techniques suggests that laser ablation may be associated with a lower risk of recurrence compared with excisional surgery, although the included studies are heterogeneous.

A systematic review by Romic et al. (2022), including 10 studies with 971 patients, reported a primary healing rate of 94.4% and a weighted mean recurrence rate of 3.8% following sinus laser-assisted closure. The authors concluded that laser treatment represents a promising option for managing chronic PD based on the published literature.

Overall, the available evidence suggests that laser-based techniques are a minimally invasive treatment option for pilonidal disease with favorable short-term outcomes, while long-term outcomes remain to be further evaluated, necessitating long-term studies to assess its effectiveness as a first-line treatment.

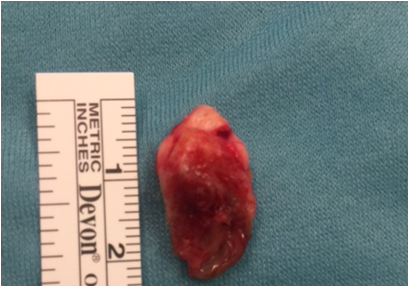
Excised pilonidal cyst

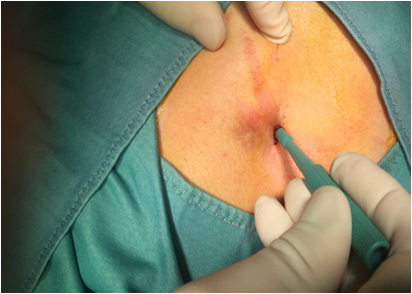
Trephine/biopsy punch minimally invasive surgery for pilonidal disease (1)

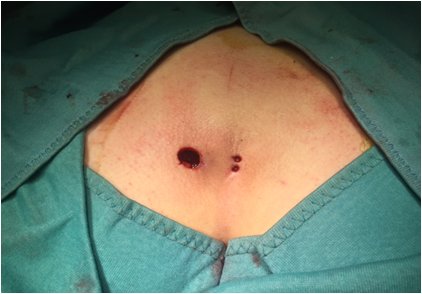
Trephine/biopsy punch minimally invasive surgery for pilonidal disease (2)

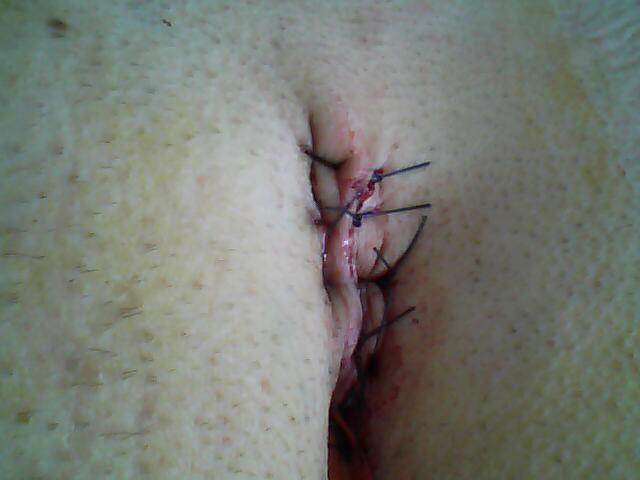
Pilonidal cyst two days after traditional closed surgery

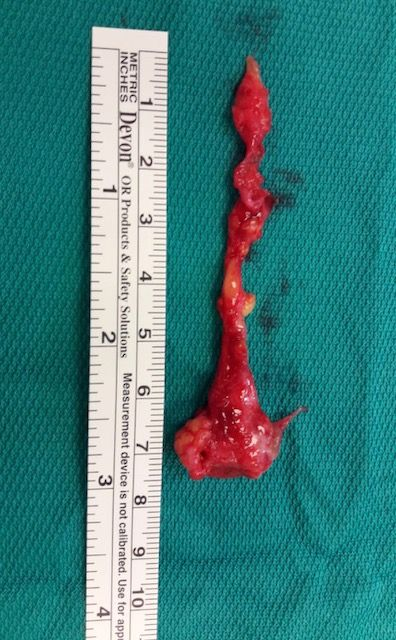
Anatomy of pilonidal disease removed after trephine or biopsy punch surgery: pilonidal fistula (top) and pilonidal cyst (bottom)

== Etymology ==
Pilonidal means 'nest of hair' and is derived from the Latin words for 'hair' (pilus) and 'nest' (nidus). The condition was first described by Herbert Mayo in 1833. R. M. Hodges was the first to use the phrase pilonidal cyst to describe the condition in 1880.

The condition was widespread in the United States Army during World War II. The condition was termed "Jeep seat" or "Jeep riders' disease", because a large portion of people who were being hospitalized for it rode in Jeeps, and prolonged bumpy rides in the vehicles were believed to have caused the condition due to irritation and pressure on the coccyx.
