= List of diseases (F) =

This is a list of diseases starting with the letter "F".

== Fa ==
=== Fab ===
- Fabry's disease

=== Fac ===
==== Face–Faci ====
- Faces syndrome
- Facial asymmetry temporal seizures
- Facial clefting corpus callosum agenesis
- Facial cleft
- Facial dysmorphism macrocephaly myopia Dandy–Walker type
- Facial dysmorphism shawl scrotum joint laxity syndrome
- Facial femoral syndrome
- Facial paralysis
- Facies unusual arthrogryposis advanced skeletal malformations
- Facio digito genital syndrome recessive form
- Facio skeletal genital syndrome Rippberger type
- Facio thoraco genital syndrome
- Faciocardiomelic dysplasia lethal
- Faciocardiorenal syndrome
- Faciooculoacousticorenal syndrome
- Facioscapulohumeral muscular dystrophy

==== Fact ====
- Factor II deficiency
- Factor V deficiency
- Factor V Leiden mutation
- Factor VII deficiency
- Factor VIII deficiency
- Factor X deficiency, congenital
- Factor X deficiency
- Factor XI deficiency, congenital
- Factor XIII deficiency, congenital
- Factor XIII deficiency

=== Fah–Fal ===
- Fahr's disease
- Fairbank disease
- Fallot tetralogy

=== Fam ===
- Familial ALS
- Familial ALS with dementia
- Familial adenomatous polyposis
- Familial amyloid polyneuropathy
- Familial aortic dissection
- Familial band heterotopia
- Familial cold autoinflamatory syndrome (FCAS)
- Familial colorectal cancer
- Familial deafness
- Familial dilated cardiomyopathy
- Familial dysautonomia
- Familial emphysema
- Familial eosinophilia
- Familial hyperchylomicronemia
- Familial hyperlipoproteinemia type I
- Familial hyperlipoproteinemia type III
- Familial hyperlipoproteinemia type IV
- Familial hyperlipoproteinemia
- Familial hypersensitivity pneumonitis
- Familial hypertension
- Familial hypopituitarism
- Familial hypothyroidism
- Familial intestinal polyatresia syndrome
- Familial Mediterranean fever
- Familial multiple lipomatosis
- Familial multiple trichodiscomas
- Familial myelofibrosis
- Familial nasal acilia
- Familial non-immune hyperthyroidism
- Familial opposable triphalangeal thumbs duplication
- Familial partial epilepsy with variable focus
- Familial periodic paralysis
- Familial polyposis
- Familial porencephaly
- Familial supernumerary nipples
- Familial symmetric lipomatosis
- Familial Treacher–Collins syndrome
- Familial veinous malformations
- Familial ventricular tachycardia
- Familial visceral myopathy
- Familial wilms tumor 2

=== Fan–Faz ===
- Fan death
- Fanconi anemia type 1
- Fanconi anemia type 2
- Fanconi anemia type 3
- Fanconi–Bickel syndrome
- Fanconi ichthyosis dysmorphism
- Fanconi like syndrome
- Fanconi pancytopenia
- Fanconi syndrome
- Fanconi syndrome, renal, with nephrocalcinosis and renal stones
- Fanconi anemia
- Fara–Chlupackova syndrome
- Farber's disease
- Farmer's lung
- Fas deficiency
- Fascioliasis
- Fatal familial insomnia
- Fatty liver
- Faulk–Epstein–Jones syndrome
- Faye–Petersen–Ward–Carey syndrome
- Fazio–Londe syndrome

== Fe ==
=== Fea–Fer ===
- Fealty syndrome
- Febrile seizure
- Fechtner syndrome
- Feigenbaum–Bergeron–Richardson syndrome
- Feigenbaum–Bergeron syndrome
- Feingold syndrome
- Felty's syndrome
- Female pseudohermaphrodism Genuardi type
- Female pseudohermaphroditism
- Female sexual arousal disorder
- Femoral facial syndrome
- Femur bifid with monodactylous ectrodactyly
- Femur fibula ulna syndrome
- Fenton–Wilkinson–Toselano syndrome
- Ferlini–Ragno–Calzolari syndrome
- Fernhoff–Blackston–Oakley syndrome
- Ferrocalcinosis cerebro vascular

=== Fet ===
- Fetal acitretin syndrome
- Fetal akinesia syndrome X linked
- Fetal alcohol syndrome
- Fetal aminopterin syndrome
- Fetal and neonatal alloimmune thrombocytopenia
- Fetal antihypertensive drugs syndrome
- Fetal brain disruption sequence
- Fetal cytomegalovirus syndrome
- Fetal diethylstilbestrol syndrome
- Fetal edema
- Fetal enterovirus syndrome
- Fetal hydantoin syndrome
- Fetal indomethacin syndrome
- Fetal iodine syndrome
- Fetal left ventricular aneurysm
- Fetal methimazole syndrome
- Fetal methyl mercury syndrome
- Fetal minoxidil syndrome
- Fetal parainfluenza virus type 3 syndrome
- Fetal parvovirus syndrome
- Fetal phenothiazine syndrome
- Fetal prostaglandin syndrome
- Fetal thalidomide syndrome
- Fetal warfarin syndrome

== Fg ==
- FG syndrome

== Fi ==
=== Fib–Fil ===
- Fiber type disproportion, congenital
- Fibrinogen deficiency, congenital
- Fibrochondrogenesis
- Fibroids
- Fibrolipomatosis
- Fibroma
- Fibromatosis gingival hypertrichosis
- Fibromatosis multiple non ossifying
- Fibromatosis
- Fibromuscular dysplasia of arteries
- Fibromuscular dysplasia
- Fibromyalgia
- Fibrosarcoma
- Idiopathic pulmonary fibrosis
- Fibrosing mediastinitis
- Fibrosis
- Fibrous dysplasia of bone
- Fibrous dysplasia
- Fibrodysplasia ossificans progressiva
- Fibula aplasia complex brachydactyly
- Fibular aplasia-ectrodactyly syndrome
- Fibular hypoplasia femoral bowing oligodactyly
- Fibular hypoplasia scapulo pelvic dysplasia absent
- Fifth disease
- Filariasis
- Filippi syndrome

=== Fin–Fit ===
- Fine–Lubinsky syndrome
- Fingerprints absence syndactyly milia
- Finnish lethal neonatal metabolic syndrome
- Finnish type amyloidosis
- Finucane–Kurtz–Scott syndrome
- Fish poisoning
- Fish-eye disease
- Fissured tongue
- Fistulous vegetative verrucous hydradenoma
- Fitz-Hugh–Curtis syndrome
- Fitzsimmons–Walson–Mellor syndrome
- Fitzsimmons–Guilbert syndrome
- Fitzsimmons–McLachlan–Gilbert syndrome

== Fl ==
- Flavimonas oryzihabitans
- Flesh eating bacteria
- Floaters
- Floating limb syndrome
- Floating-Harbor syndrome
- Florid cystic endosalpingiosis of the uterus
- Flotch syndrome
- Fluorosis
- Flynn–Aird syndrome

== Fo ==
- Focal agyria pachygyria
- Focal alopecia congenital megalencephaly
- Focal dermal hypoplasia
- Focal dystonia
- Focal facial dermal dysplasia
- Focal or multifocal malformations in neuronal migration
- Foix–Chavany–Marie syndrome
- Foix–Alajouanine syndrome
- Follicular atrophoderma-basal cell carcinoma
- Follicular dendritic cell tumor
- Follicular hamartoma alopecia cystic fibrosis
- Follicular ichthyosis
- Follicular lymphoma
- Follicular lymphoreticuloma
- Fontaine–Farriaux–Blanckaert syndrome
- Food allergy
- Food poisioning
- Forbes–Albright syndrome
- Forbes disease
- Foreign accent syndrome
- Forestier's disease
- Formaldehyde poisoning
- Forney–Robinson–Pascoe syndrome
- Fountain syndrome
- Fournier gangrene
- Fowler–Christmas–Chapele syndrome
- Fowler's syndrome
- Fox–Fordyce disease

== Fr ==
=== Fra ===
- Fragile X syndrome
  - Fragile X syndrome type 1
  - Fragile X syndrome type 2
  - Fragile X syndrome type 3
- Fragoso–Cid–Garcia–Hernandez syndrome
- Franceschetti–Klein syndrome
- Francheschini–Vardeu–Guala syndrome
- Francois dyscephalic syndrome
- Franek–Bocker–Kahlen syndrome
- Fraser–Jequier–Chen syndrome
- Fraser-like syndrome
- Fraser syndrome
- Frasier syndrome
- FRAXA syndrome
- FRAXD
- FRAXE syndrome

=== Fre–Fri ===
- Free sialic acid storage disease
- Freeman–Sheldon syndrome
- Freiberg's disease
- Freire–Maia odontotrichomelic syndrome
- Freire–Maia–Pinheiro–Opitz syndrome
- Frenkel–Russe syndrome
- Frey's syndrome
- Frias syndrome
- Fried–Goldberg–Mundel syndrome
- Friedel–Heid–Grosshans syndrome
- Friedman–Goodman syndrome
- Friedreich ataxia congenital glaucoma
- Friedreich's ataxia

=== Fro–Fru ===
- Froelich's syndrome
- Frölich's syndrome
- Fronto nasal malformation cloacal exstrophy
- Frontofacionasal dysplasia type Al gazali
- Fronto-facio-nasal dysplasia
- Frontometaphyseal dysplasia
- Frontonasal dysplasia acromelic
- Frontonasal dysplasia Klippel–Feil syndrome
- Frontonasal dysplasia phocomelic upper limbs
- Frontonasal dysplasia
- Frontotemporal dementia
- Froster–Huch syndrome
- Froster–Iskenius–Waterson syndrome
- Fructose intolerance
- Fructose-1,6-bisphosphatase deficiency
- Fructose-1-phosphate aldolase deficiency, heredita
- Fructosemia, hereditary
- Fructosuria

=== Fry ===
- Frydman–Cohen–Ashenazi syndrome
- Frydman–Cohen–Karmon syndrome
- Fryer syndrome
- Fryns–Fabry–Remans syndrome
- Fryns–Hofkens–Fabry syndrome
- Fryns–Smeets–Thiry syndrome

== Fu ==
- Fucosidosis type 1
- Fucosidosis
- Fugue state
- Fuhrmann–Rieger–De Sousa syndrome
- Fukuda–Miyanomae–Nakata syndrome
- Fukuyama-type muscular dystrophy
- Fumarase deficiency
- Fumaric aciduria
- Functioning pancreatic endocrine tumor
- Fungal infection
- Fuqua–Berkovitz syndrome
- Furlong–Kurczynski–Hennessy syndrome
- Furukawa–Takagi–Nakao syndrome
- Furunculous myiasis
- Fused mandibular incisors
