= Du Pan syndrome =

- Other names: Fibular hypoplasia and complex brachydactyly
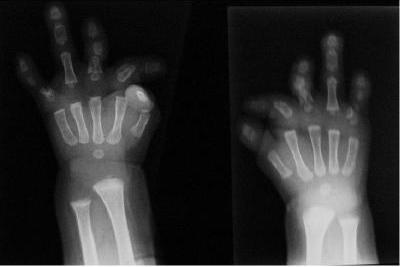
- Radiograph of the hands of an Egyptian patient with Du Pan syndrome
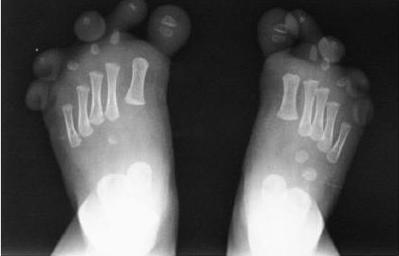
- Radiograph of the feet of an Egyptian patient with Du Pan syndrome
- Specialty: Medical genetics
- Symptoms: Complicated brachydactyly and dysplastic/aplastic/hypoplastic fibula bones and hands and feet
- Complications: Balance
- Usual onset: Birth
- Duration: Life-long
- Causes: Genetic mutation
- Risk factors: Being born to consanguineous parents or having a parent with the disorder
- Diagnostic method: Through symptoms and molecular testing
- Prevention: None
- Prognosis: Good
- Frequency: Very rare, around 30 cases have been reported.

Du Pan syndrome, also known as fibular aplasia-complex brachydactyly syndrome, is an extremely rare genetic condition that affects bone growth, associated with alterations to the GDF5 (also known as CDMP1) gene. Unlike other rare genetic conditions, Du Pan syndrome does not affect brain function or the appearance of the head and trunk. The way that this condition is passed on from generation to generation varies, but it is most commonly inherited in an autosomal recessive manner, meaning two copies of the same version of the gene are required to show this condition. Rare cases exist where the mode of inheritance is autosomal dominant, which means having only one version of the gene is enough to cause this condition.

== Symptoms ==
Du Pan syndrome is a form of acromesomelic dysplasia, a condition that affects bone growth. It is characterized by the incomplete development of the fibula, resulting in under-developed hands and feet and shorter fingers and toes. However, the development in other aspects of the body and mind is not affected. The impacted extremities will appear disproportionately smaller in comparison to the rest of their body. They often describe the toes and fingers to appear “ball-like”, as they are missing the length between the foot and the ends of the toes, or the hand and the ends of the fingers.

=== Limb structure variations ===
One of the primary symptoms of Du Pan syndrome is brachydactyly, the presence of short digits (fingers and toes). The thumbs and big toes are the most severely affected, often featuring shortened and broadened nails. Syndactyly, the fusion of digits, often involves the second, third, and fourth toes.

The condition includes missing or underdeveloped phalanges (bones of the fingers and toes). The hands are the most affected part of the upper limb. Although all metacarpals (bones of the hand) are present, they are relatively short. Some individuals may have an extra finger on both hands, a condition called bilateral postaxial polydactyly. In the lower limb, the middle segments (tibia and fibula) and the feet are significantly affected. Short tarsal bones (bones of the foot) are also present. A defining feature of the syndrome is fibular hypoplasia or aplasia, which refers to the underdevelopment or complete absence of the calf bone.

=== Joint and skeletal variations ===
Joint mobility is often restricted in individuals with Du Pan syndrome. Symptoms may include changes in hip and radius (forearm bone) morphology. In some cases, there is synostosis (fusion) of the carpal bones in the wrists. A common feature in the feet is talipes equinovalgus or clubfoot. This causes the feet to point downward and inward which can further affect mobility and posture.

Another hallmark is hypoplastic nails, characterized by underdeveloped or completely absent nails and accompanying soft tissue variations. Deviation of the fingers and toes is also observed.

=== Additional skeletal features ===
Short stature is a common trait, although individuals with the syndrome generally maintain a normal growth rate. They may also exhibit unique facial features, like a narrow nose bridge.

=== Psychomotor and cognitive development ===
Affected individuals typically exhibit a full range of movement and coordination. There is no significant impact on cognitive functions, and there are no major changes observed in the axial skeleton (spine and torso).

== Genetics ==
Du Pan syndrome is primarily linked to changes in specific genes that influence bone and joint development.

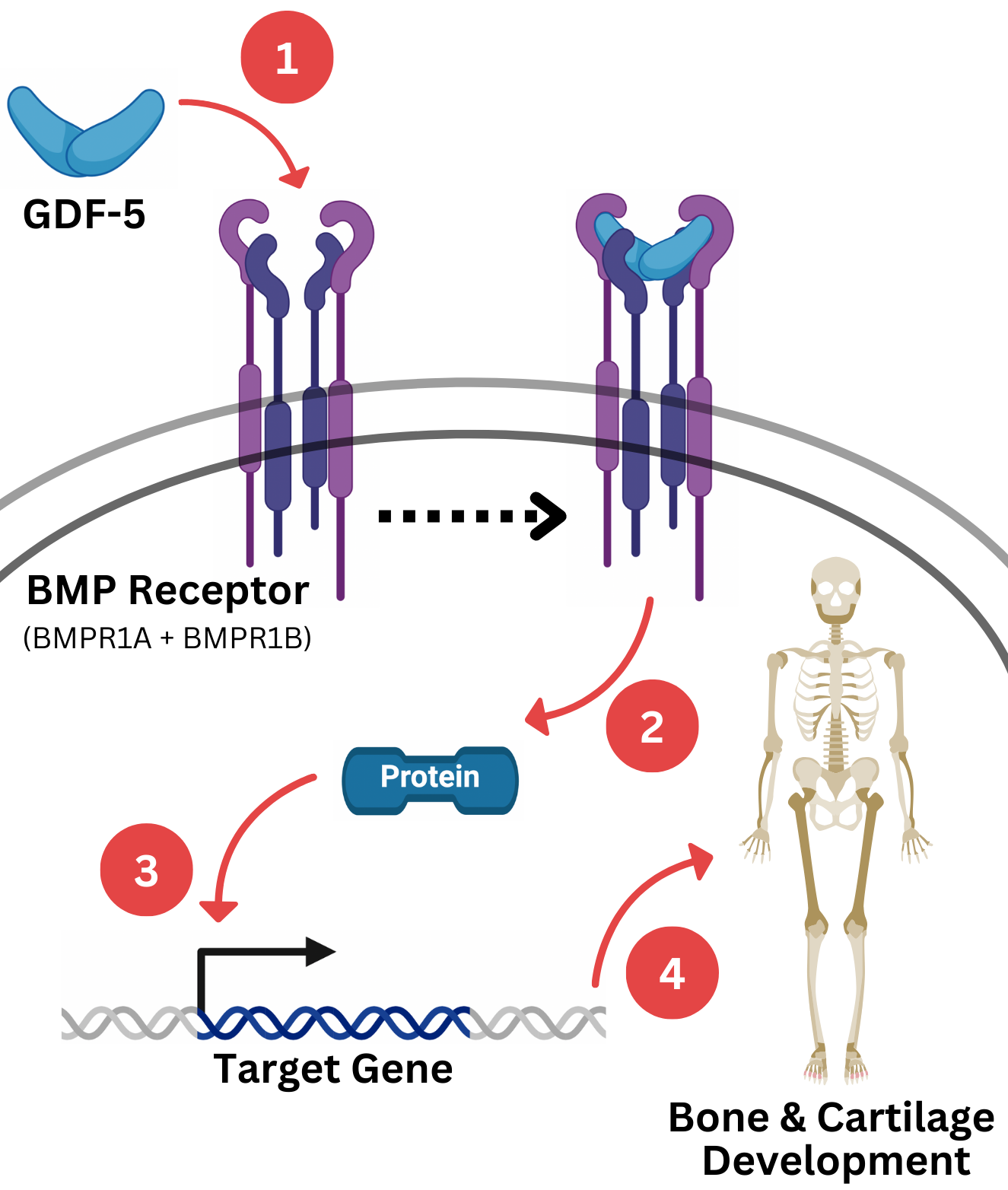
Diagram showing how GDF-5 interacts with the BMP receptor to send signals that help control bone and cartilage development.

One major gene implicated in the condition is GDF5 (Growth and Differentiation Factor 5), which functions in an autosomal recessive pattern. This means that a person must inherit two copies of the altered gene, one from each parent, to show symptoms. The GDF5 protein binds to a bone morphogenetic protein (BMP) receptor, BMPR1B, which is essential for proper formation of joints and bones during fetal development. A known genetic variation in the GDF5 gene involves the substitution of the amino acid Leucine with Proline at position 441 in the protein sequence, leading to the development of Du Pan Syndrome.

The BMPR1B gene itself is also associated with a Du Pan-like syndrome when its function is lost. Like GDF5, BMPR1B follows an autosomal recessive inheritance pattern. For the BMPR1B protein to fulfill its bone and cartilage-forming role, it requires a functional GDF5 protein to be present and to form that association in the cell.

Another gene involved in bone development, BDA2, has been shown to cause Du Pan syndrome in an autosomal dominant manner. In this case, only one altered copy of the gene is sufficient for an individual to develop the syndrome.

== Diagnosis ==
Until April 2023, fewer than 30 people worldwide had been diagnosed with Du Pan syndrome. The primary diagnosis of the syndrome largely depends on its clinical symptoms, including short or completely missing leg bones and "ball-like" shaped toes and fingers. Molecular confirmation of the syndrome utilizes genetic testing for alterations in the cartilage-derived morphogenetic protein-1 gene (CDMP1). This method is often used as a complementary tool for diagnosis, and only 5 of all diagnosed Du Pan syndrome patients were molecularly confirmed due to technological limitations before the 2000s.

The first prenatally diagnosed case of Du Pan syndrome was found using a combination of ultrasound imaging and gene sequencing, which identify the DNA sequence of both the fetus and the mother.

== Management and treatments ==
Currently, Du Pan syndrome treatments primarily focus on managing the associated symptoms and improving the individual's quality of life. The management of this condition often involves a multidisciplinary approach, with medical professionals, orthopedic specialists, and physical therapists working together.

Orthopedic interventions may include surgical procedures to correct bone position, limb length conditions, or joint issues, which can help improve mobility and reduce pain. Physical therapy and rehabilitation are often recommended to enhance muscle strength, joint flexibility, and overall physical function. Assistive devices such as braces, crutches, or wheelchairs may be used to promote mobility and comfort.

Pain management is an essential aspect of care, and medications or other therapies may be prescribed to alleviate discomfort. Additionally, genetic counselling can provide families with information about the condition's inheritance patterns and guide family planning decisions.

Currently, ongoing studies at Boston Children’s Hospital aim to enhance the diagnosis and treatment of Acromesomelic Dysplasia (which Du Pan syndrome is a subtype of) by investigating its genetic causes, identifying potential associated health issues, and developing methods to assess bone health through blood tests.

== Similar syndromes ==
Other Acromesomelic Dysplasias sharing similar symptoms with Du Pan syndrome include Hunter–Thompson dysplasia and Grebe dysplasia. All of these subtypes are caused by changes in either the GDF5 or BMPR1B genes, which work together in bone and cartilage formation during development.

Symptoms of Hunter–Thompson dysplasia include increased and more frequent joint differences, like dislocated hips, knees, radial heads, and underdeveloped thigh bone protrusion (femoral condyle) when compared to Du Pan syndrome. Additionally, there are minor differences in the pattern of short supporting bones in the hands and feet.

Individuals with Grebe dysplasia typically have a considerably shorter stature, particularly the femurs (thigh bone) and tibias (shin bone). Moreover, there is a marked and consistent reduction in size observed in the smaller tubular bones of the hands and feet.

Commonalities among all these conditions lie in genetic variations affecting GDF5. Carriers with two copies of affected GDF5 alleles usually develop Grebe dysplasia, while carriers with only one copy may exhibit relatively milder symptoms and Hunter–Thompson dysplasia and Du Pan syndrome.
