= Acromesomelic dysplasia =

- Other names: Acromesomelic dwarfism
- Specialty: Orthopedic

Acromesomelic dysplasia is a rare skeletal disorder that causes abnormal bone and cartilage development, leading to shortening of the forearms, lower legs, hands, feet, fingers, and toes. Five different genetic mutations have been implicated in the disorder. Treatment is individualized but is generally aimed at palliating symptoms, for example, treatment of kyphosis and lumbar hyperlordosis.

== Signs and symptoms ==
Acromesomelic dysplasia (AMD) is characterized by the inhibition of growth of certain long bones such as the forearms and lower legs. This disease typically becomes apparent during the first years of life. Forearms, lower legs, hands and feet do not grow proportionally with the rest of the body. Over time, individuals can have a hard time fully extending their arms, rotating the arms inwards towards the body with palms facing down and rotating the arms outward with the palms facing upward. Abnormalities of cartilage and bone development may also cause the bones within the fingers, toes, hands and feet to become sufficiently shorter and broader. During early childhood, individuals may experience progressive, abnormal curvature of the spine. Common symptoms include:

- Short stature
- Progressive degeneration
- Stiffness
- Tenderness
- Osteoarthritis
- Abnormal bone shape

Infants with AMD typically have a normal birth weight, but can have other characteristic facial abnormalities.

- Macrocephaly
- Frontal bossing
- Occipital prominence
- Slightly flattened midface
- Abnormally small, pug nose

== Causes ==
AMD is extremely rare and is inherited as an autosomal recessive genetic trait. Autosomal recessive means that two copies of an abnormal gene must be present in order for the disease to develop. This can be inherited from the parents or the gene can mutate in the person who has AMD.

=== Pathophysiology ===
Genetic studies indicate that the mutation at chromosome 9p13-12, for AMD Maroteaux, is a gene that codes for a protein that affects bone development, natriuretic peptide receptor B (Npr2). This is a receptor for the hormone C-type natriuretic peptide which is a hormone that is essential for bone growth. AMD Grebe dysplasia has a gene located at chromosome 20q11.2 This chromosome codes for a protein known as growth and development factor-5 (GDF5). AMD with genital anomalies has a gene located at chromosome 4q23-24; this codes for a protein known as a bone morphogenetic protein receptor, type 1B.Genetic diseases are determined by the combination of genes for a certain trait that is on the chromosomes received from the mother and father.

Dominant genetic disorders happen when a single copy of an abnormal gene is needed to cause a certain disease. The abnormal gene can be inherited from either parent or result from a gene mutation.

== Diagnosis ==
The diagnosis is based on a clinical presentation, molecular analysis, electropherogram and radiograph. This disease is diagnosed within the first few years of life. Identification of the main characteristics is the key factor in diagnosis. Molecular analysis is used to examine the DNA of the affected person and their parents. For this, a blood sample is needed and the DNA will be extracted with an automatic DNA extractor. The results will show the mutated chromosome and identify if this chromosome was passed on from a parent. A radiograph will show abnormal growth plates and misshapen bones in the limbs. This can confirm the abnormal development and premature fusion of the regions where the diaphyses, of certain long bones, meet their epiphyses. Electropherogram is used to identify genotyping. These results can be used to compare to a normal sequence and relatives sequences.

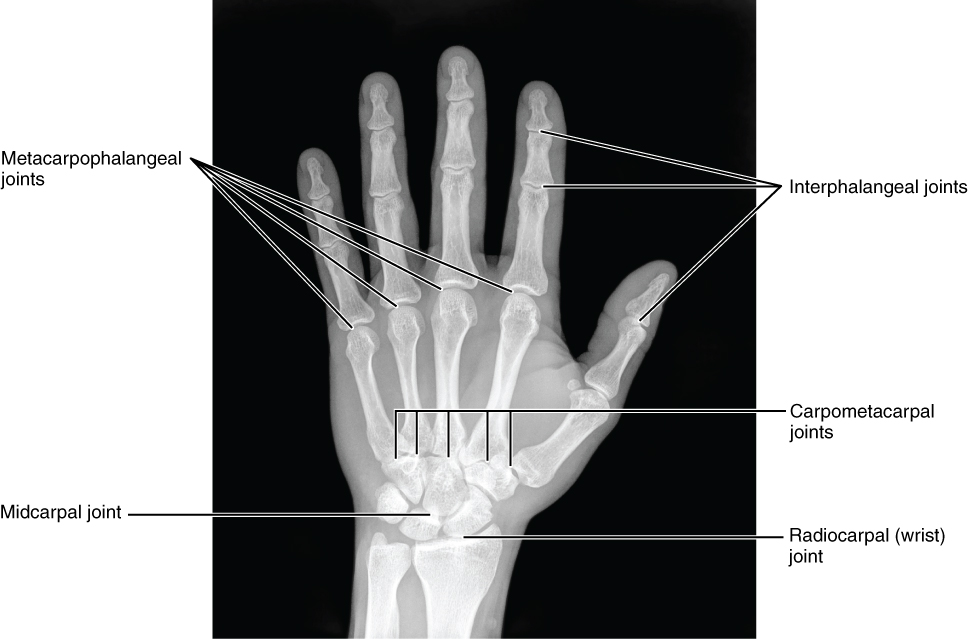
This is a radiograph of the left hand that shows the different types of joints. This scan can show the growth plate and the shape of each bone.

It is important to have a detailed patient history, including the parents or other relatives. Typically, the parent that carries the chromosome for AMD, seems to be shorter than average. Monitoring the weight and height of the person affected with AMD is important. Based on the person's age, they should be meeting a certain percentile to identify any issues that may be causing a stunt in growth.

There are five types of AMD:

1. Osebold-Remondini
2. Maroteaux
3. Grebe dysplasia
4. Du Pan syndrome
5. Acromesomelic dysplasia with genital anomalies

Osebold-Remondini causes shortness of limbs and hypoplasia of the second phalanges with fusion to the remaining phalanges, carpal and tarsal coalitions. Maroteaux type causes severe dwarfism with a height below 120 cm. This type also causes shortening of the middle and distal segments of the limbs. Grebe dysplasia causes extreme abnormalities of the limb joints and limbs. In this type of AMD, the hands and feet are affected the most. This type primarily affects the joints in the hands and feet causing a lack of articulation. Grebe dysplasia does not have any major effects on the stature. Du Pan syndrome causes underdevelopment of the tissues in the fibulae, feet and hands. Acromesomelic dysplasia with genital anomalies causes shortness of limbs and stature with congenital malformations of the female genital tract and male reproductive system.

All five types of AMD are caused by a gene mutation or receiving it from their parents. The differences between the types are the different genes that are affected. The mutated gene for each type is listed in the pathophysiology section.

== Treatment ==
There are a few treatment plans for AMD and each person's results vary. Depending on the type of AMD and the symptoms the person has, their therapy may differ. Physical therapy is aimed to help specific symptoms. For example, abnormal curvature of the spine may be treated by exercises, braces, casts and in severe cases, corrective surgery. It is important to start physical therapy as early as possible to ensure that people with AMD can reach their full potential.

One treatment that can help a person who is affected with AMD is recombinant human growth hormone (rhGH). Recombinant human growth hormones are produced in the pituitary gland and can help spur growth in children and adolescents. It is used in AMD patients to help muscle and bone growth. This treatment is long-term and will not cure this disease, it will only help the patient grow a couple of centimeters. A case study showed a growth velocity of 3.6-4.2 cm/year during this first year of treatment. As well as height improving from 1.2 to 1.8 SD over 5 years of treatment. Another case study was conducted that showed within a year, a patient had an increase of 7.0 cm/year. With this treatment, it is important to start it during the puberty stage. Some patients that have received this treatment, have seen no difference or increase in height. There is no prevention with AMD and not many options for managing the symptoms.

Kyphosis is an excessive outward curvature of the spine resulting in a hunch back. Treatment for this disease includes taking pain relievers and osteoporosis medications. Medication for osteoporosis helps strengthen the bones to help prevent any spinal fractures. Lumbar hyperlordosis is a condition that occurs when the lower back region experiences stress or extra weight. This causes the lower back to become arched and creates muscle spasms or pain. Treatment focuses on stretching the lower back, quads, hip flexors and strengthening the hamstrings, glutes and abdominal muscles. Braces may be used to help relieve some stress or pressure on the lower back.

Risk factors from taking rhGH include:

1. Nerve, muscle or joint pain
2. Edema
3. Carpal tunnel syndrome
4. Numbness and tingling of the skin
5. High cholesterol
6. Increase the risk of diabetes

Other risk factors that increase the risk of having AMD include a family history of having this condition or a child born from parents who are close blood relatives.

== Prognosis ==
A person diagnosed with AMD will have a normal life expectancy. With this disease, there are no chances of full recovery; it is something that the person will have for their entire life. Abnormal cartilage and bone development can affect many bones in the body. Long term effects include joint pain, arthritis, abnormal curvature of the spine and short stature of limbs and height.

== Epidemiology ==
The prevalence of AMD is <1/1000000. Nearly ten million people in the world carry the NPR2 mutated gene (Maroteaux type); only 3500 people in the entire world are affected with AMD. AMD is rare and there are less than 100 reported cases. AMD can be classified as skeletal dysplasia, which approximately occurs in 1 out of 5000 births. This disease affects both males and females as well as any racial or ethnic group. The majority of the case studies involve patients that live in Pakistan, Morocco, or Karnataka. AMD does primarily begin in the first few years of life or as early as the neonatal phase, but it can affect anyone at any age.

The earliest known case of AMD occurred in the late Upper Paleolithic. While AMD would have significantly interfered with the ability to live a hunter-gatherer lifestyle, the individual in question lived until late adolescence, suggesting that they were cared for by the group.

== Current research ==
A research study was published in 2022 that established a new type of AMD. In the case study, an exome sequence was performed on two girls that had short stature due to acromesomelic limb shortening. The researchers wanted to determine if protein kinase cGMP-dependent type II gene (PRKG2) had any effect on longitudinal growth in bones. The results showed two homozygous PRKG2 variants: nonsense and a frameshift. These variants alter the downstream mitogen activated protein kinase signaling pathway by failing to phosphorylate c-Raf 1 at Ser43 and reduce activation in response to fibroblast growth factor receptor 2.

Another research study was conducted on mice to find a new treatment for people with AMD (Maroteaux type). The results showed that Npr2 is expressed in osteoblasts and chondrocytes; leading to the conclusion that the disruptions in the growth plate from Npr2, can be a leading cause for AMD. They also found that Npr2 stops the activation of a signaling pathway for MEK/ERK, which is a pathway in the growth plates. The data showed that treatment of a pharmacological inhibitor of MEK/ERK pathway might improve bone growth. The data for this treatment produced promising results. It showed that the drug effectively inhibited MEK/ERK activation. This study was only conducted on mice, but it could potentially be a treatment to help people diagnosed with AMD.

There are research studies being conducted to see the effect of rhGH. As stated in the treatment section, results may vary per person. Some patients seem to have an overall positive effect of these hormones and it helps them grow a few more centimeters each year. No other clinical trials are going on for AMD. There is a lack of knowledge or medication that can treat or reverse this disease.

== Notable cases ==
- Kiruna Stamell, British-Australian actor
