= Thai symphalangism syndrome =

- Specialty: Medical genetics, Dentistry
- Usual onset: birth
- Duration: life-long
- Causes: Genetic mutation
- Prevention: none
- Prognosis: good
- Frequency: very rare

Thai symphalangism syndrome is a novel genetic disorder which is characterized by proximal and distal symphalangism of the fingers, postaxial polydactyly, hypodontia, ear dysplasia, blepharoptosis, short stature, toe distal phalange agenesis, and frenula hyperplasia.

== Etymology ==
This disorder was discovered in 2003 by Kantaputra et al., who described a twelve-year-old Thai girl with the symptoms mentioned above.

Unlike other rare genetic syndromes with only one to five reported cases, this disorder has a known genetic cause: mutations in the NOG and GDF5 genes. Mutations responsible for other symphalangism syndromes were not found in the girl.
