= FFDD =

FFDD may refer to:

- Focal facial dermal dysplasia, a rare genetic disorder
- Panama Defense Forces, the former Panamanian military, known in Spanish as Fuerzas de Defensa de Panamá (FFDD)
