= Eduard Sandifort =

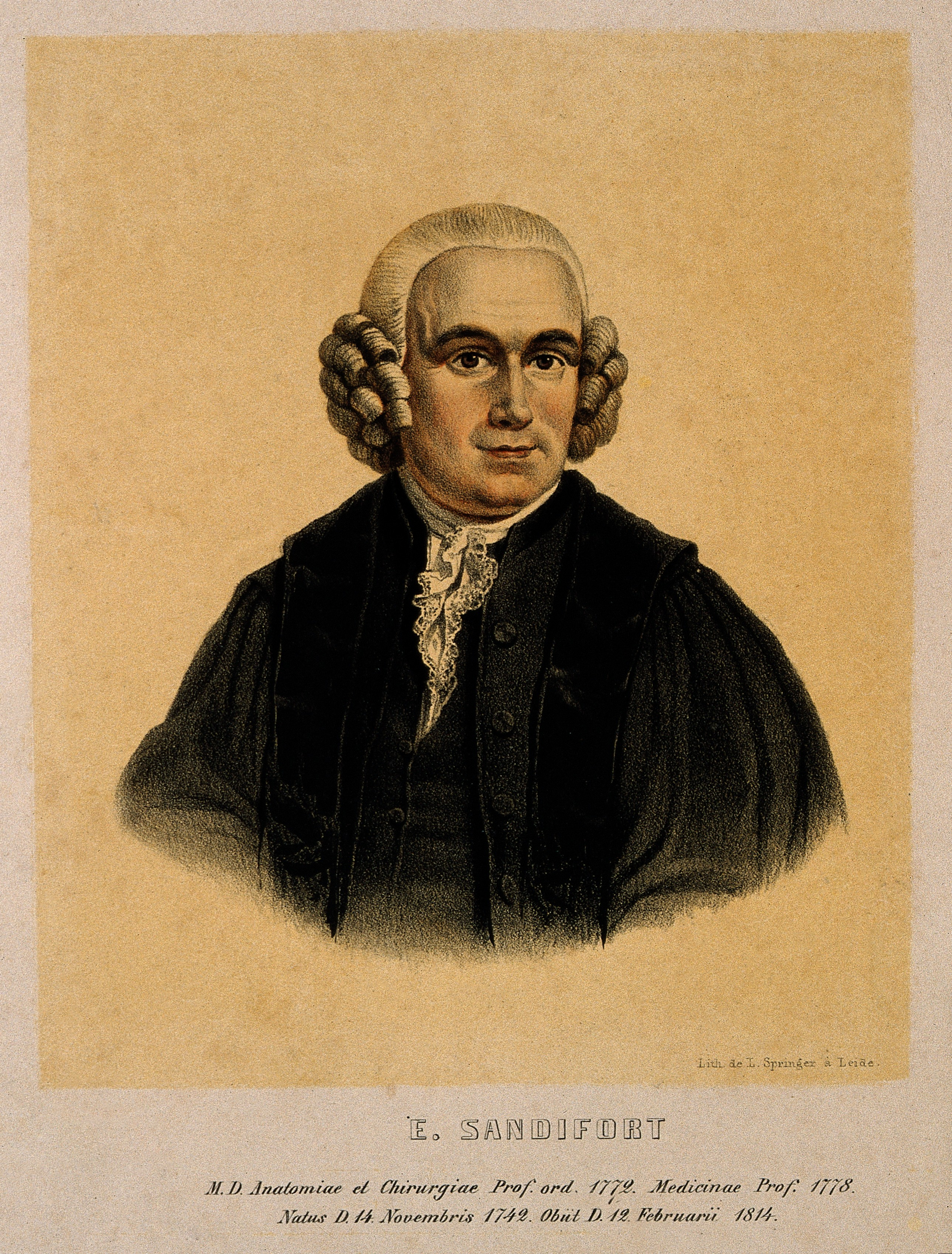
- Portrait. Credit: Wellcome Library
- Born: 14 November 1742; Dordrecht
- Died: 12 February 1814 (aged 71); Leiden
- Education: Leiden University
- Spouse: Catharina Johanna Kinkeed (m. 1775)
- Scientific career
- Fields: Anatomy; Surgery
- Workplaces: Leiden University
- Thesis: Dissertatio anatomico-obstretica de pelvi, ejusque in partu dilatatione (1763)

Eduard Sandifort (November 14, 1742 – February 12, 1814) was a Dutch physician and anatomist. He received his medical doctorate degree (Ph.D.) from Leiden University in 1763, and worked as a general practitioner in The Hague. He was fluent in Dutch, German, Swedish, and Italian. He became a professor of anatomy and surgery in 1771 at Leiden University. His most important writings are Observationes Anatomico-pathologicæ (1778), Excercitationes anatomicoacademicæ (1783–85), and the Museum Anatomicum Academiae Lugduno-Batavæ (1789–93), which was finished by his son, Gerard Sandifort (1779–1848). Sandifort translated Nils Rosén von Rosenstein's Underrättelser om barn-sjukdomar och deras botemedel (The diseases of children, and their remedies) to Dutch in 1768. Sandifort was elected in 1768 as a foreign member of the Swedish Royal Academy of Sciences in Stockholm. In 1779 he was the first to document a case of carpal coalition.
