= Familial nasal acilia =

- Other names: Familial nasal acilia syndrome
- This disorder has been described as autosomal recessive
- Specialty: Medical genetics
- Causes: Genetic mutation
- Prevention: None
- Prognosis: Medium
- Frequency: rare
- Deaths: -

Familial nasal acilia is a rare congenital defect which is characterized by the complete absence of cilia on the epithelial cells of the respiratory tract. Symptoms are common within one's family and start as soon as one is born, with signs such as respiratory distress, dyspnea, lobar atelectasis, bronchiectasis and neo-natal pneumonia. Other symptoms that occur later in life include chronic moist coughing, chronic sinusitis, chronic otitis media, chronic rhinitis, and recurrence of upper and lower respiratory tract infections.

Exact prevalence is unknown, OrphaNet estimates this condition to affect less than 1 out of every million people worldwide. R Soferman et al. described this disorder to be "autosomal recessive".
