= Fitzsimmons–Guilbert syndrome =

- Other names: Paraplegia-brachydactyly-cone-shaped epiphysis syndrome

Fitzsimmons–Guilbert syndrome is an extremely rare genetic disease characterized by a slowly progressive spastic paraplegia, skeletal anomalies of the hands and feet with brachydactyly type E, cone-shaped epiphyses, abnormal metaphyseal–phalangeal pattern profile, sternal anomaly (pectus carinatum or excavatum), dysarthria, and mild intellectual deficit.

== Pathophysiology ==
With so few described cases, establishing the basic pathophysiological mechanisms or genetic abnormalities has not been possible.

== History ==
Fitzsimmons and Guilbert first described male uniovular twins, aged 20 years, who had had slowly progressive spastic paraplegia from early in life. Both had skeletal abnormalities of the hands and feet: brachydactyly, cone-shaped epiphyses, and an abnormal metaphyseal-phalangeal pattern profile. In addition, they had nonspecific dysarthria and low-normal intellectual capacity.

Since the original report, three more cases have been described, including two (Lacassie et al.) with a more severe intellectual disability and a different metacarpal-phalangeal pattern profile, though these cases may represent a new disease entity.
