= Factor X deficiency =

- Other names: Stuart-Prower factor deficiency
- Factor X deficiency is inherited in an autosomal recessive manner
- Specialty: Hematology, medical genetics

Factor X deficiency (X as Roman numeral ten) is a bleeding disorder characterized by a lack in the production of factor X (FX), an enzyme protein that causes blood to clot in the coagulation cascade. Produced in the liver, FX, when activated, cleaves prothrombin to generate thrombin in the intrinsic pathway of coagulation. This process is vitamin K dependent and enhanced by activated factor V.

The condition may be inherited or, more commonly, acquired.

== Signs and symptoms ==
Symptoms may differ greatly, as apparently modifiers control to some degree the amount of FX that is produced. Some affected individuals have few or no symptoms while others may experience life-threatening bleeding. Typically this bleeding disorder manifests itself as a tendency to easy bruising, nose bleeding, heavy and prolonged menstruation and bleeding during pregnancy and childbirth, and excessive bleeding after dental or surgical interventions. Newborns may bleed in the head, from the umbilicus, or excessively after circumcision. Other bleeding can be encountered in muscles or joints, brain, gut, or urine

While in congenital disease symptoms may be present at birth or show up later, in patients with acquired FX deficiency symptoms typically show up in later life.

== Causes ==
Inherited or congenital FX deficiency is passed on by autosomal recessive inheritance. A person needs to inherit a defective gene from both parents. People who have only one defective gene usually do not exhibit the disease, but can pass the gene on to their offspring. Different genetic mutations have been described.

In persons with congenital FX deficiency the condition is lifelong. People affected should alert other family members as they may also have the condition or carry the gene. In the general population the condition affects about 1 in 1 million people. However, the prevalence may be higher as not all individuals may express the disease and be diagnosed.

In the acquired form of FX deficiency an insufficient amount of factor X is produced by the liver due to liver disease, vitamin K deficiency, buildup of abnormal proteins in organs (amyloidosis) or certain medications (i.e. warfarin). In amyloidosis FX deficiency develops as FX and other coagulation factors are absorbed by amyloid fibrils.

== Diagnosis ==
Blood tests are needed to differentiate FX deficiency from other bleeding disorders. Typical FX deficiency presents with normal thrombin time, prolonged prothrombin time (PT) and prolonged partial thromboplastin time (PTT). FX antigen and its coagulant activity can be used to classify the severity of the condition:

1. Type I has low levels of FX antigen and activity.
2. Type II has low coagulant activity but normal or borderline FX antigen levels.

The FX gene is found on chromosome 13q34. Heterogeneous mutations have been described in FX deficient patients.

== Treatment ==
There are several treatments available for bleeding due to factor X deficiency. A specific FX concentrate was not available as of 2009.

1. Prothrombin complex concentrate (PCC) supplies FX with a risk of thrombosis.
2. Fresh frozen plasma (FFP): This is relatively inexpensive and readily available. While effective this treatment carries a risk of blood-borne viruses and fluid overload.
3. If vitamin K levels are low, vitamin K can be supplied orally or parenterally.

Treatment of FX deficiency in amyloidosis may be more complex and involve surgery (splenectomy) and chemotherapy.

== History ==
The condition was described independently in the 1950s. Telfer and coworkers described a female patient named Prower in 1956, and Hougie and coworkers described a male patient named Stuart in 1957. When experiments showed that serum from these two patients lacked the same factor, these two patients were the first people identified with FX deficiency and the factor was called Stuart-Prower factor, later factor X.
