= Tarsal coalition =

Abnormal tissue connection between bones of the foot

- Other names: Peroneal spastic flatfoot, Tarsal synostosis, or Tarsal dysostosis
- Tarsal bones(normal)
- Specialty: Rheumatology

Tarsal coalition is an abnormal connecting bridge of tissue between two normally-separate tarsal (foot) bones, and is considered a sort of birth defect. The term 'coalition' means a coming together of two or more entities to merge into one mass (in the case of bones, see synostosis). The tissue connecting the bones, often referred to as a "bar", may be composed of fibrous or osseous tissue. The two most common types of tarsal coalitions are calcaneo-navicular (calcaneonavicular bar) and talo-calcaneal (talocalcaneal bar), comprising 90% of all tarsal coalitions. There are other bone coalition combinations possible, but they are very rare and lack published literature. Symptoms tend to occur in the same location, regardless of the location of coalition: on the lateral foot, just anterior and below the lateral malleolus. This area is called the sinus tarsi.

== Symptoms ==
The bones of children are very malleable in infancy. This will generally mean that, despite the presence of a coalition, the bones can deform enough to allow painless walking until the child's skeleton has matured enough. 'Skeletal maturing' means that bone is laid down in the tissue that forms the immature bone shape gradually until adult bone is achieved at about the age of seventeen years in the feet. Other body parts reach skeletal maturity at different times. The onset of symptoms related to a tarsal coalition usually occurs at about 9 to 17 years of age, with a peak incidence occurring at 10 to 14 years of age. Symptoms may start suddenly one day and persist, and can include pain or pressure while walking, lack of endurance for activity, fatigue, muscle spasms and cramps, an inability to rotate the foot, or antalgic gait. Symptoms of tarsal coalitions are often exacerbated by physical activity, both in initial presentation and after diagnosis.

== Causes ==
Tarsal coalition is almost exclusively a product of an error during the dividing of embryonic cells in utero. Other causes of synostosis (bone fusion) could include a surgical 'screwing together' of two bones, a very advanced case of arthritis leading to self-fusion of a joint by an internal process within the body or some other very traumatic event. The birth defect responsible for tarsal coalition is thought to often be an autosomal dominant genetic condition. This means that if you have a parent with the disorder it is highly likely to be passed on to offspring.

== Anatomy ==
Anatomically, the abnormal connecting 'bridge' is virtually all cartilage in the young child, often nearly all bone in an adult and a mixture as the skeleton ossifies in between these ages. Some fibrous tissue (like gristle) is often also involved. When the bridging link becomes bony enough, it results in a limitation of motion and this brings about the onset of pain.

The bones of the tarsus are the rear most bones in the adjacent diagram: calcaneus, talus, navicular, cuboid, medial cuneiform, intermediate cuneiform and lateral cuneiform bones. These bones create the two major foot joints – the subtalar and midtarsal joints – that allow complex motions to occur in the feet. These motions are necessary for such activities as walking over uneven terrain and creating a gait that allows normal function of the knees, hips, back, etc.

== Diagnosis ==
In a case of an adolescent with rear foot pain, the physical exam will reveal that the foot movement is limited. This is both because there is a physical blockade to movement and because the brain will 'turn on' the muscles around the area to stop the joint moving toward the painful 'zone'. X-rays will usually be ordered and, in general, if there is enough toughness to the tissue bridge that pain has begun – there will usually be enough bone laid down to show up in an x-ray.

More high-tech investigations such as CT scan will be required if proceeding to surgery. If the bridge appears to be mostly fibrous tissue, an MRI would be the preferred modality to use.

== Treatment ==
The goal of non-surgical treatment of tarsal coalition is to relieve the symptoms by reducing the movement of the affected joint. This might include non-steroidal anti-inflammatory drugs (NSAIDs), steroidal anti-inflammatory injection, stabilizing orthotics or immobilization via a leg cast. At times, short term immobilization followed by long term orthotic use may be sufficient to keep the area free of pain.

Surgery is very commonly required. The type and complexity of the surgery will depend on the location of the coalition. Essentially, there are two types of surgery. Wherever possible, the bar will be removed to restore normal motion between the two bones. If this is not possible, it may be necessary to fuse the affected joints together by using screws to connect them solidly. Cutting away the coalition is more likely to succeed the younger the patient. With age comes extra wear in the affected and adjacent joints that makes treatment more difficult.

== See also ==
- Carpal coalition
