= BMPR1B =

Protein-coding gene in the species Homo sapiens

Identifiers
- Aliases: BMPR1B, ALK-6, ALK6, CDw293, AMDD, BDA1D, BDA2, bone morphogenetic protein receptor type 1B, AMD3
- External IDs: OMIM: 603248; MGI: 107191; GeneCards: BMPR1B
Available structures
PDB	Ortholog search: PDBe RCSB
PDB	List of PDB id codes 3MDY
Enzyme activity
EC #	BRENDA	ExPASy	KEGG	MetaCyc
2.7.11.30	↗	↗	↗	↗

Gene location (Human)
Chr.	Chromosome 4 (human)
Band	4q22.3	Start	94,757,955 bp
Band	4q22.3	End	95,158,448 bp

Gene location (Mouse)
Chr.	Chromosome 3 (mouse)
Band	3|3 H1	Start	141,542,897 bp
Band	3|3 H1	End	141,875,186 bp
RNA expression pattern
Bgee	Human / Mouse (ortholog); Top expressed in: Achilles tendon; bronchial epithelial cell; tail of epididymis; testicle; buccal mucosa cell; seminal vesicula; entorhinal cortex; renal medulla; trigeminal ganglion; right uterine tube / Top expressed in: cumulus cell; primary oocyte; secondary oocyte; optic stalk; zygote; lumbar subsegment of spinal cord; prostate; vestibular sensory epithelium; stria vascularis; lobe of prostate; More reference expression data
BioGPS	n/a
Gene ontology
Molecular function	transferase activity; nucleotide binding; protein kinase activity; metal ion binding; kinase activity; protein serine/threonine kinase activity; transmembrane receptor protein serine/threonine kinase activity; transforming growth factor beta receptor activity, type I; protein binding; SMAD binding; ATP binding; transforming growth factor beta-activated receptor activity; growth factor binding
Cellular component	integral component of membrane; HFE-transferrin receptor complex; membrane; receptor complex; plasma membrane; integral component of plasma membrane; soma; dendrite
Biological process	eye development; positive regulation of extrinsic apoptotic signaling pathway via death domain receptors; skeletal system development; cell differentiation; limb morphogenesis; ovarian cumulus expansion; chondrocyte differentiation; phosphorylation; positive regulation of bone mineralization; chondrocyte development; cellular response to BMP stimulus; BMP signaling pathway; protein phosphorylation; negative regulation of chondrocyte proliferation; cartilage development; positive regulation of osteoblast differentiation; transmembrane receptor protein serine/threonine kinase signaling pathway; retina development in camera-type eye; positive regulation of cartilage development; positive regulation of chondrocyte differentiation; positive regulation of cell differentiation; ovarian cycle; camera-type eye development; inflammatory response; dorsal/ventral pattern formation; endochondral bone morphogenesis; cartilage condensation; positive regulation of transcription by RNA polymerase II; proteoglycan biosynthetic process; retinal ganglion cell axon guidance; cellular response to growth factor stimulus; transforming growth factor beta receptor signaling pathway; pattern specification process
Sources:Amigo / QuickGO
Orthologs
Databases	NCBI: entry; OMA: entry
Species	Human	Mouse
Entrez	658	12167
Ensembl	ENSG00000138696	ENSMUSG00000052430
UniProt	O00238	P36898
RefSeq (mRNA)	NM_001203; NM_001256792; NM_001256793; NM_001256794	NM_001277216; NM_001277217; NM_001277218; NM_001277220; NM_007560 NM_001355043
RefSeq (protein)	NP_001194; NP_001243721; NP_001243722; NP_001243723	NP_001264145; NP_001264146; NP_001264147; NP_001264149; NP_031586 NP_001341972
Location (UCSC)	Chr 4: 94.76 – 95.16 Mb	Chr 3: 141.54 – 141.88 Mb
PubMed search
- Wikidata
View/Edit Human	View/Edit Mouse

Bone morphogenetic protein receptor type-1B also known as CDw293 (cluster of differentiation w293) is a protein that in humans is encoded by the BMPR1B gene.

== Function ==
BMPR1B is a member of the bone morphogenetic protein (BMP) receptor family of transmembrane serine/threonine kinases. The ligands of this receptor are BMPs, which are members of the TGF-beta superfamily. BMPs are involved in endochondral bone formation and embryogenesis. These proteins transduce their signals through the formation of heteromeric complexes of 2 different types of serine (threonine) kinase receptors: type I receptors of about 50-55 kD and type II receptors of about 70-80 kD. Type II receptors bind ligands in the absence of type I receptors, but they require their respective type I receptors for signaling, whereas type I receptors require their respective type II receptors for ligand binding.

The BMPR1B receptor plays a role in the formation of middle and proximal phalanges.

== Clinical significance ==
Mutations in this gene have been associated with primary pulmonary hypertension.

In the chick embryo, it has been shown that BMPR1B is found in precartilaginous condensations. BMPR1B is the major transducer of signals in these condensations as demonstrated in experiments using constitutively active BMPR1B receptors. BMPR1B is a more effective transducer of GDF5 than BMPR1A. Unlike BMPR1A null mice, which die at an early embryonic stage, BMPR1B null mice are viable.
