= Familial aortic dissection =

- Other names: Cystic medial necrosis of aorta, Annuloaortic ectasia
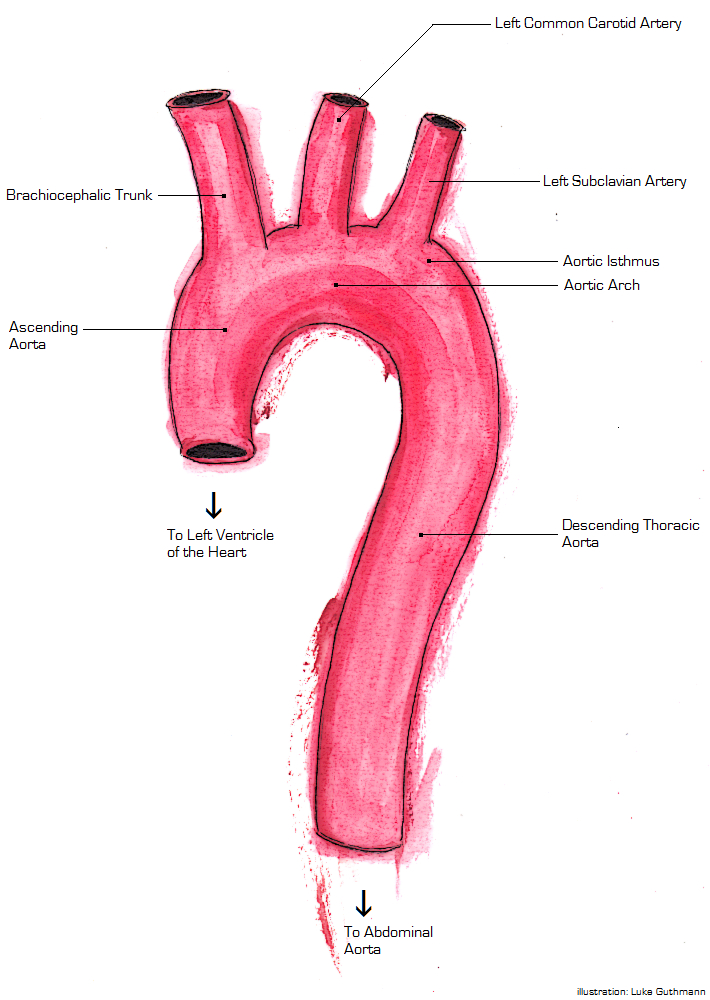
- Aorta

Familial aortic dissection or FAD refers to the splitting of the wall of the aorta in either the arch, ascending or descending portions. FAD is thought to be passed down as an autosomal dominant disease and once inherited will result in dissection of the aorta, and dissecting aneurysm of the aorta, or rarely aortic or arterial dilation at a young age. Dissection refers to the tearing of the aortic wall, resulting in the separation of its layers. However, the exact gene(s) involved has not yet been identified. It can occur in the absence of clinical features of Marfan syndrome and of systemic hypertension. Over time this weakness, along with systolic pressure, results in a tear in the aortic intima layer thus allowing blood to enter between the layers of tissue and cause further tearing. Eventually complete rupture of the aorta occurs and the pleural cavity fills with blood. Warning signs include chest pain, ischemia, and hemorrhaging in the chest cavity. This condition, unless found and treated early, usually results in death. Immediate surgery is the best treatment in most cases. FAD is not to be confused with PAU (penetrating atherosclerotic ulcers) and IMH (intramural hematoma), both of which present in ways similar to that of familial aortic dissection.

== Causes ==
The inheritance pattern of aortic dissection is multifactorial. There is a good amount of evidence that shows the disease is autosomal dominant, with some penetrance. There is also the possibility of age related dependence. It is known that Marfan’s Syndrome and Ehler-Danlos Syndrome lead to an increased risk for development of FAD. Marfan’s Syndrome is not required to have an aortic dissection. One study suggests that the chromosomal locus for the gene is 5q13-14. The same study found that other genes may be linked, and include loci for Marfan and Ehler-Danlos Syndromes, genes for metalloproteinase 3 and 9, and tissue inhibitor of malloproteinase 2 as well as two loci on chromosomes 5q13-14 and lq23.2-24. Still other studies show that mutations in smooth muscle cell-specific isoforms of alpha actin and beta myosin heavy chain may cause FAD. Mutations in the genes TGFBR 1 and 2 are known to cause dissections in aortas with normal diameter size (>4.3 cm) and gene FPN1 mutations typically affect aortas with larger diameters (<4.4 cm).

There are several hypotheses which attempt to explain how the dissection physically occurs. The first states that a tear develops in the intima layer of the aorta which allows blood to flow from the lumen of the aorta into the intima. This event creates a dissection and essentially two lumens. The second hypothesis suggests that the vasa vasorum ruptures and causes a hemorrhage in the wall of the aorta. The hemorrhaging promotes tearing of the intima and eventually aortic dissection.

The major risk factors for FAD include high blood pressure, old age, haematoma, genetic weakening of aortic wall, cocaine use, pregnancy and diseases causing abnormal connective tissue. One study found that the average age(s) for the occurrence of dissection caused by degenerative aneurysm is 65 years and up. Dissections thought to be the result of genetic mutations appear to be more likely to occur between the ages of 40 and 60. Another study found that 20% of patients with FAD have a close relative with a history of thoracic aortic aneurysm or dissection which suggests yet another major risk factor.

== Physiology ==
FAD is normally associated with Marfan syndrome, Ehlers–Danlos syndrome, and various other genetic disorders which affect the connective tissues of the cardiovascular system. There are various mechanisms by which the medial layers of the lumen are stressed and eventually torn. Once torn these areas begin to fill with blood and become susceptible to aneurysm formation. Depending on the location of the tear, FAD normally affects the ascending or descending aorta, where the primary characteristic of a bulge can be seen. This bulge is the result of the creation of a false lumen due to the vast amount of blood seepage from the aortas and surrounding veins. In some cases it is not uncommon to see degeneration in the ascending and descending aorta and the atrioventricular and semilunar valves due to elastolysis or breakdown and loss of elastic fibers. These connective tissue malfunctions are traceable to mutations, and lack of genes encoding for important components such as collagens, and micro-fibril-associated glycoproteins. Breakdown among these connective layers eventually compromises the integrity of the aortic lumen.

Depending on the extent of pooling and damage to the blood vessel, the Svensson system was created to diagnose and describe the five classes of pathological processes that may be visible due to the dissection. Class 1 refers to any dissection with a true and false lumen. Class 2 specifically depends on the presence of hematoma or hemorrhaging at the site of the dissection. Class 3 is a dissection without hematoma. Class 4 is recognized by the presence of an ulcer among the lumen. Class 5 has to do with any sort of traumatic hemorrhaging in the dissection. Class 5, in the most case, is the most severe and life-threatening due to large amounts of rapid blood loss.

Those experiencing aortic dissection typically will complain of agonizing pains described with a ripping feeling in the chest that for some may migrate to their backs. Anything that compromises or obstructs the amount of blood flow and the delivery of nutrients and oxygen to the walls of the ascending and descending aorta has a large impact on the viability of the layers of the surrounding lumen. Chronic hypertension, Inflammatory disease, excessive plaque build-up among coronary walls, intimal thickening, and arteriosclerosis are all believed to increase the likelihood of FAD occurring in an individual.

== Diagnosis ==
Since the cause of FAD has not been genetically pinpointed, the only way to diagnose FAD is through the examination of phenotypic variations in the aorta. Usually echocardiography is used to take measurements of the aortic root as well as transesophageal echocardiography. Biomarkers lend a quick way to diagnose dissection when time is of the essence. These have the ability to relay the levels of smooth muscle myosin heavy chain protein present, which is released from damaged aortic tissue.

There are two types of FAD; groups A and B. Normally if any area of the ascending aorta is involved in the dissection this is considered group A. If the dissection occurs within the descending aorta this is classified in group B. These two groups can than be broken down into three classes of FAD: Type 1, Type 2 and Type 3. Group A consists of Types 1 and 2, whereas Group B consists only of Type 3. Type 1 encompasses dissection in the distal ascending aorta closest to the heart, not including the aortic arch. Type 2 refers to dissection of the ascending aorta, closer to and including the aortic arch. Type 3 refers to the descending thoracic and abdominal aorta.

Group A dissections are the more serious of the two due to the location of the dissection in the ascending aorta, which leads to a higher risk of congestive heart failure and pericardium and/or aortic valve rupture. Individuals also tend to be predisposed to type A if they do have Marfans or Elhers-Danlos syndromes. These contribute to a higher fatality rate in group A dissection if immediate surgery is not performed. The most common corrective surgeries are actual aortic valve replacement and coronary artery bypass. The five-year survival rate after surgery is a successful 70.4% due to vigilant monthly physical exams and chest x-rays to monitor progress. Group B dissections typically have a higher surgery mortality rate and are therefore not good candidates. Instead medical management is the common response to treating and keeping dissections of the descending aorta under control.

== Treatment ==
Type 1 and Type 2 FAD call for the same treatment: immediate surgery to replace the aorta. Surgery is required due to the high risk of mortality. Type 3 is less severe and requires the maintenance of blood pressure through diet and exercise. Upon diagnosing someone with FAD intravenous antihypertensive treatment is frequently used. Often intravenous sodium nitroprusside is used for its efficiency in lessening the pulsatile load thus reducing blood pressure. Reducing this force slows the progression of the dissection. Surgical success depends on age, severity of symptoms, postoperative organ dysfunction and stroke. Surgical intervention is always indicated in Type 1 cases. Aortic surgery is palliative, not curative. The goal is to merely to prevent rupture, restore blood flow, and fix any aortic valve dysfunction. Post operative protocols include frequent monitoring of the aorta diameter. Statins and beta blockers are also popular treatments used to reduce future plaque build up and blockage of epinephrine receptors as a way to control heart rate and blood pressure.

Long term treatment should also include regular check ups every 3 to 6 months. A CT scan or MRI is recommended, along with required chest x-rays. Antihypertensive therapy with beta adrenergic antagonists is required regardless of medical versus surgical treatment. Ten to twenty percent of those who choose surgical intervention are re-operated on due to compression, aneurysm development or blood leakage.

== Research directions ==
Currently, there is controversy over whether or not inheritance truly plays a role in FAD, and if so which gene it acts upon. FAD does not come from strictly one predisposing factor, such as hypertension. It is suggested that the combination of environmental factors along with genetics may contribute to causing FAD. Before newer and more effective cures and therapies can be developed, first the specific gene mutation must be identified. Until such a gene is determined, scientists say patient education, and physician awareness is vital. Currently scientists have found animal models to be beneficial in understanding the pathology behind FAD. In the future there is hope to develop drugs that will better support and strengthen the aortic wall. Endovascular methods of treatment are becoming increasingly popular, and scientists hope to use this technique in both acute and chronic cases.
