= Familial opposable triphalangeal thumbs duplication =

Familial opposable triphalangeal thumb duplication
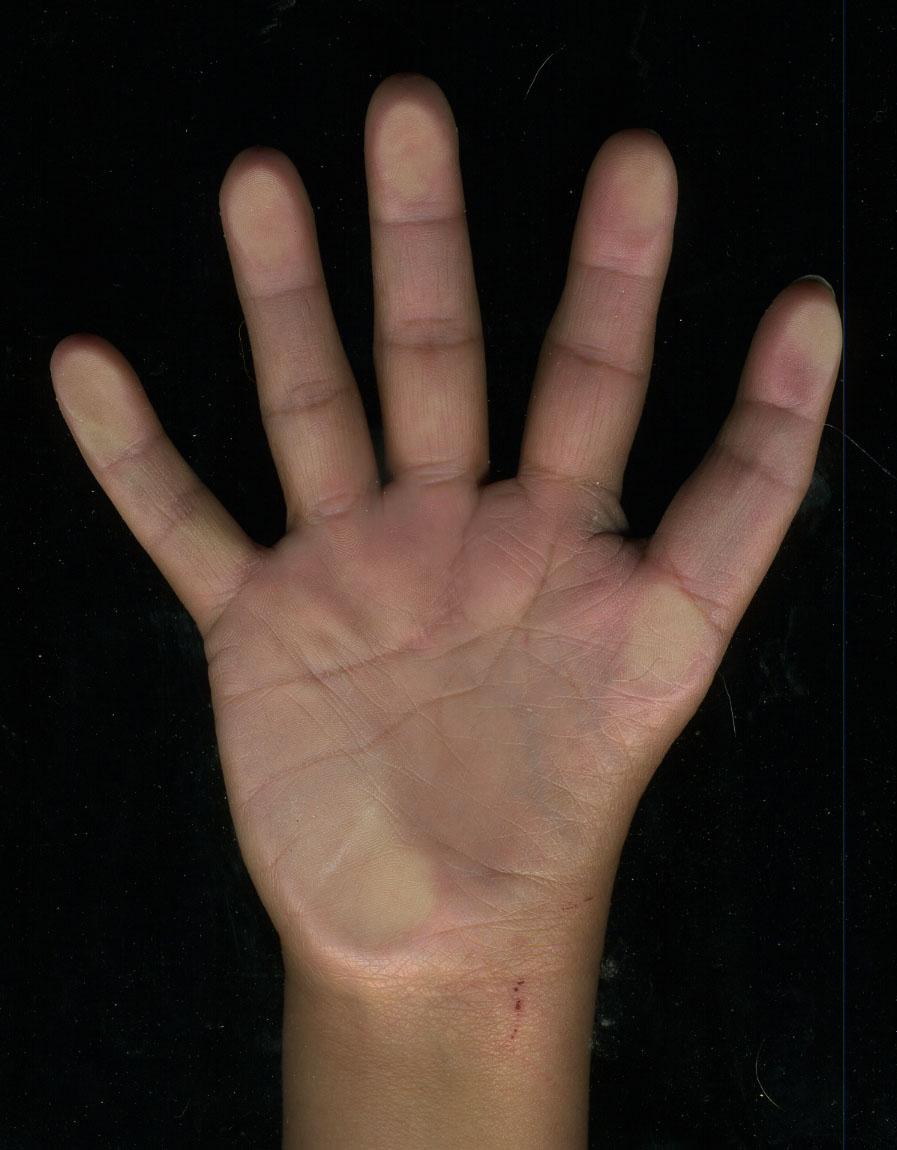
- Specialty: Medical genetics
- Usual onset: Birth
- Duration: Life-long
- Causes: Genetic mutation
- Frequency: Rare, less than 1 in 25,000 births.

Familial opposable triphalangeal thumb duplication is a limb malformation syndrome and a type of pre-axial polydactyly, characterized by having duplicated opposable triphalangeal thumbs. This condition can be a symptom of other genetic disorders, such as Holt–Oram syndrome and Fanconi anemia. This trait is autosomal dominant and often runs in families (hence "familial"). Sometimes big toe duplication, post-axial polydactyly, and syndactyly of the hand and feet can occur alongside this malformation Approximately 20 families with the condition have been described in medical literature.

== Signs and symptoms ==
The most common symptom is a duplication of a triphalangeal thumb in the hands, which would leave the person affected by the condition with two triphalangeal thumbs in each hand, alongside other digital and radiological anomalies, such as duplication of the big toe, hypoplastic duplicated radius bones, etc.

There are multiple phenotypes associated with this condition due to its sometimes incomplete penetrance, this means that, even in the same family, people can have varying degrees of digital anomalies.

This has been observed in various families, one such instance is the 2 families from a relatively remote and isolated region in the Netherlands reported by P Heutink et al. in 1994; even among members of the same families, the phenotype they exhibited was very variable, while some members had an opposable thumb with mild triphalangy manifesting as an underdeveloped delta phalanx, other members had a fully functional extra digit in their hands (not related to the thumb) as well as a fully formed thumb with an outstanding resemblance to an index finger. Other features that could be seen among the same families included duplicated, underdeveloped thumb rays, hypoplasia of the thenar muscle, and syndactyly with metacarpal synostosis affecting the fourth and fifth rays.

== Complications ==
None of the families described in medical literature have had complications associated with their condition.

== Genetics ==
This condition is usually caused by a mutation in a gene located on the 7q36 locus of the seventh chromosome.

The gene that is mutated is usually the LMBR1 gene, this gene encodes a protein called Limb region 1 protein homolog.

The mutation that this gene contains varies among families, most of the point mutations that have been reported have either been transitions or small duplications of material within the gene, which usually aren't any more than 600 kb. Examples of the mutations that have been found in families with the condition include:

- 589 kb duplication in intron 5 of the gene, found in 9 affected members of a 4-generation German family.
- Duplications ranging from 131 to 398 kb in intron 5 of the gene, found in affected members of 5 multi-generational Han Chinese families.
- 295T>C transition in intron 5 of the gene, found in 3 un-related British individuals with the condition.
- 276 kb duplication in intron 5 of the gene, found in 9 affected members of a Turkish family.
- 297G>A and 334T>G transitions (respectively) in intron 5 of the gene, found in affected members of 2 un-related French families.
- c.402T>C transition in intron 5 of the gene, found in a total of 57 affected members of 2 un-related 5-generation Mexican families.
- c.165A>G and c.297T>C transitions in intron 5 of the gene, found in affected members of 2 un-related Dutch families.

== Diagnosis ==
Diagnostic methods that can be used to diagnose this condition include the following:

- Physical examination
- Radiography
- Whole genome sequencing

== Treatment ==
Treatment for a triphalangeal thumb usually involves the resection of a phalanx in the triphalangic thumb, this can be done with one of various procedures known as an osteotomy.

This treatment method is more effective with milder cases than it is with more severe cases of TPT.

== Prevalence ==
According to OMIM, between 100 and 200 cases from 20 separate families across the world have been described in medical literature, most of these families were either East Asian or European.

== History ==
This condition was possibly discovered in 1917 by Atwood and Pond.

== See also ==
- Brachydactyly
- Heart-hand syndromes
