= FRAXD =

Genetic fragile site found in humans

Identifiers
- Aliases: FRAXD, fragile site, aphidicolin type, common, fra(X)(q27.2) D
- External IDs: GeneCards: FRAXD
Orthologs
Databases	NCBI: entry
Species	Human	Mouse
Entrez	2480	n/a
Ensembl	n/a	n/a
UniProt	n a	n/a
RefSeq (mRNA)	n/a	n/a
RefSeq (protein)	n/a	n/a
Location (UCSC)	n/a	n/a
PubMed search		n/a
- Wikidata
View/Edit Human

Fragile site, aphidicolin type, common, fra(X)(q27.2) D. is a fragile site in the human genome denoted by the symbol FRAXD. Fragile sites are inherited locations in the DNA which have a tendency to fracture. This fragile site is located of the q arm of chromosome X at position 27.2, and is used in genetic testing in humans.
