= Chondrodysplasia, Grebe type =

Genetic disorder

- Specialty: Medical genetics
- Symptoms: Dwarfism, Dysmelia
- Causes: GDF5 gene mutation
- Diagnostic method: Exome sequencing, clinical symptoms

Chondrodysplasia Grebe type is a rare genetic disorder. It is caused by a mutation to the GDF5 gene. This mutation may be inherited in an autosomal recessive pattern.

== Signs and symptoms ==
Chondrodysplasia Grebe type causes both dwarfism and dysmelia (short limb deformity). It may also cause dental problems. There is significant phenotypic variability between individuals.

At birth, patients with Grebe-type chondrodysplasia display severe dwarfism. Afflicted individuals may also experience severe shortening and deformities of the long bones, fusion or absence of carpal and tarsal bones, ball shaped fingers, polydactyly, and absent joints.

== Cause ==
Chondrodysplasia Grebe type is caused by a mutation to the GDF5 gene. It is inherited in an autosomal recessive pattern. Because of this, 60% of people with chondrodysplasia Grebe type have consanguinous parents.

== Diagnosis ==
Due to the small number of signs and symptoms, and rarity, chondrodysplasia Grebe type is hard to diagnose. Genetic testing, usually exome sequencing, is used to identify the mutation to the GDF5 gene.
