= Feigenbaum–Bergeron–Richardson syndrome =

- Other names: Atherosclerosis, premature, with deafness, nephropathy, diabetes mellitus, photomyoclonus, and degenerative neurologic disease, premature atherosclerosis with photomyoclonic epilepsy, deafness, diabetes mellitus, nephropathy, and neurodegenerative disorder.
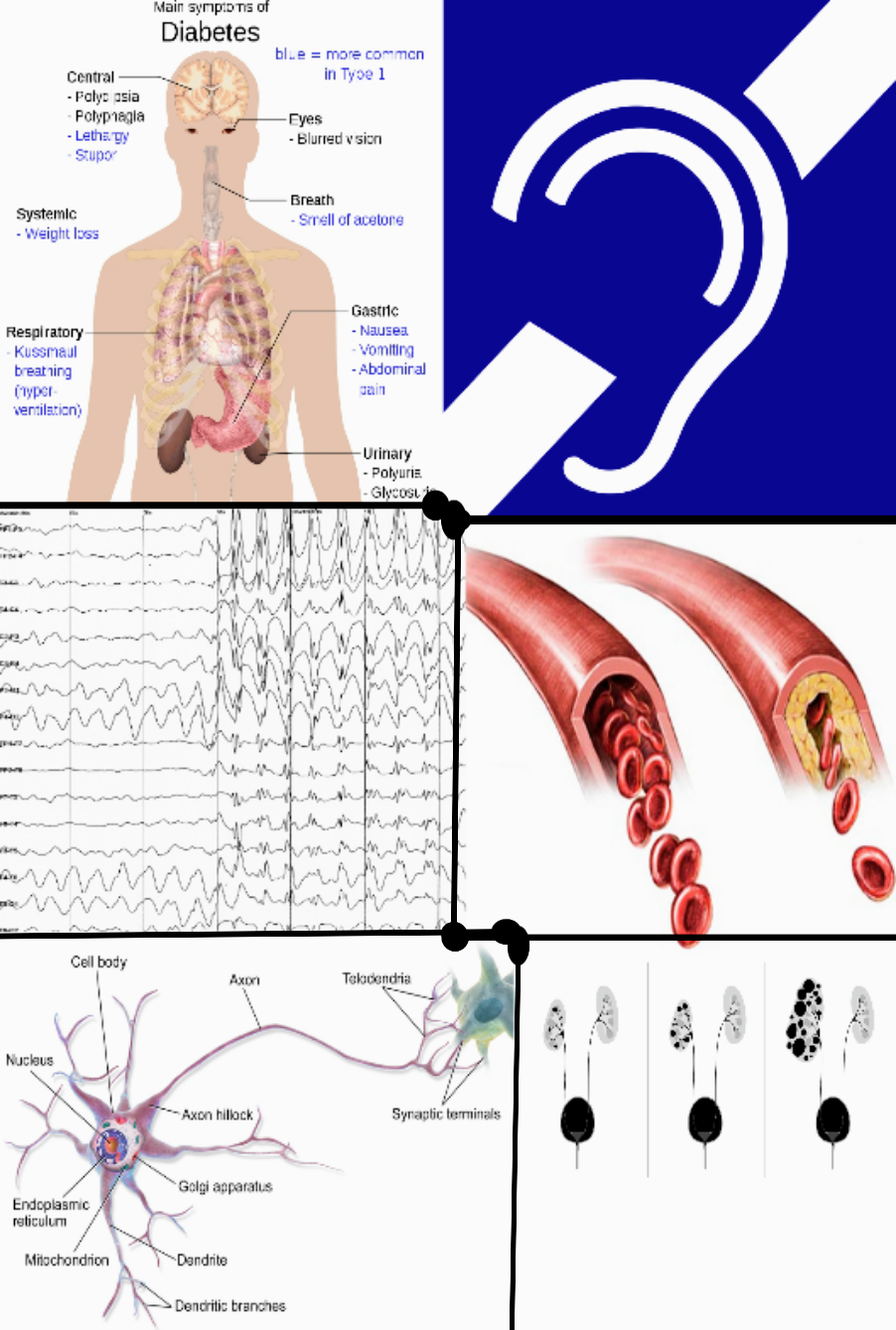
- Specialty: Medical genetics
- Causes: Genetic mutation
- Prevention: none
- Prognosis: Poor, people with the disorder die in their 30s–40s
- Frequency: very rare, only 1 family is known to have the disorder

Feigenbaum–Bergeron–Richardson syndrome, also known as atherosclerosis-deafness-diabetes-epilepsy-nephropathy syndrome, is a very rare fatal genetic disorder which is characterized by atherosclerosis, hearing loss, diabetes mellitus, epilepsy, progressive neurological deterioration and nephropathy. This disorder has been described in two brothers, and it is thought to be inherited in either an autosomal or X-linked recessive manner. No new cases have been reported since 1994. People with this disorder do not usually live beyond 30 to 40 years of age.
