= Fibular aplasia-ectrodactyly syndrome =

- Other names: Brachydactyly-ectrodactyly with fibular aplasia or hypoplasia

Fibular aplasia-ectrodactyly syndrome (or other synonyms such as brachydactyly-ectrodactyly with fibular aplasia or hypoplasia) is a very rare genetic condition which is characterized by the absence (aplasia) or underdevelopment (hypoplasia) of the fibula (calf bone, long bone lateral to the tibia), ectrodactyly (split hand/foot malformation), and/or brachydactyly (shortened digits) or syndactyly (fusion of digits). Additional symptoms may include shortness of the femur and tibial/knee/hip/ankle defects. This condition is inherited in an autosomal dominant manner, meaning that a single copy of the altered gene inherited from one parent is sufficient to cause the condition.

== Etiology ==
This condition was first described in 2002. It was discovered that this condition seems to have a male preference in sporadic cases, which occur without a family history or prior genetic predisposition. These sporadic cases may arise due to nonpenetrance (when an individual carries the condition causing gene mutation - a change in DNA sequence, without developing the condition itself). In contrast, familial cases, where the condition is inherited, tends to have an equal male-female preference. Offspring have a higher chance of being born with the condition if the mother carries the gene or is affected herself.

This condition is very rare, since only 60 cases have been recorded in medical literature.

== Symptoms ==
One of the most frequent signs of these conditions includes premature birth (baby born too early) while other frequent symptoms involve mostly the hand, feet and certain limbs.

=== Hands and feet ===
Fibular aplasia-ectrodactyly syndrome causes physical symptoms that result in both hypoplasia and aplasia of the fibular and metacarpal (any of the five bones of the hand or forefoot). The hands and feet are often characterized by phalangeal (relating to the fingers' and toes’ small bones) hypoplasia and metatarsal (relating to the bones of the feet) while the extreme can form ectrodactyly of the hands and or feet.

=== Limbs ===
The most common characteristic shows shortened limbs, including the femur (thigh bone). The other common symptom is ulnar aplasia/hypoplasia (underdeveloped or missing part of the forearm bone). Within the familial cases found, it was observed that there was a higher frequency of ulnar (forearm bone) defects as well as females tending to have more symptoms related to the upper limb.

From the cases that have been studied, there are no differences in terms of physical symptoms between males and females within sporadic cases. The presentation of these symptoms varies depending on the individual are most commonly appeared at the neonatal stage (newborn children).

=== Variable expressivity ===
Variable expression can be analyzed looking at the number of affected limbs and the severity. The phenotype for upper limbs, with increasing severity, can range from only showing brachydactyly or syndactyly, deficiency in a central axis, to involvement of the ulna and hand. The severity of the lower limbs can also be similarly analyzed, ranging from brachydactyly or syndactyly, fibular aplasia, to involvement of the femoral.

== Diagnosis ==
To be diagnosed with fibular aplasia-ectrodactyly syndrome, examinations such as a complete physical examination, varying laboratory tests, imaging studies (X-rays and CT scans to examine limbs, hands and feet structures) and assessment of symptoms can be completed.

A detailed medical history assessment may be done in order to examine for autosomal dominant inheritance patterns in the case for familial cases.

== Treatments ==
Treatment for fibular aplasia-ectrodactyly varies depending on the severity of the case. The main focus is on reducing leg length discrepancies and stabilizing the knee and ankle joints. One approach is the use of orthotic devices for support, which can help improve walking stability. In cases where limb length discrepancy is significant, procedures like epiphysiodesis or limb lengthening may be considered. Limb lengthening is often done using external circular fixators, which are devices that encircle the leg and gradually adjust bone length to align with the unaffected limb. In some severe cases where limb function is significantly compromised, amputation followed by the fitting of a prosthesis may provide the best functional outcome. These methods aim to optimize movement and limb functionality, ensuring each patient receives a tailored plan to address their specific needs.

== Epidemiology ==
When observing how often and where this condition has been identified, the prevalence is less than 1 person per 1,000,000 individuals. This condition is extremely rare yet shows global distribution of both sporadic and familial cases.
