= Seaver–Cassidy syndrome =

- Other names: Facial dysmorphism-shawl scrotum-joint laxity syndrome

Seaver–Cassidy syndrome is a very rare disorder characterized by certain facial, genital, and skeletal deformities, as well as an unusual susceptibility to bleeding. Seaver Cassidy syndrome was first described in 1991 by Laurie Seaver and Suzanne Cassidy.

== Signs and symptoms ==
Signs of Seaver–Cassidy syndrome include several facial disorders, including hypertelorism and telecanthus, epicanthal folds, downslanting palpebral fissures, ptosis, a broad nasal bridge, malar hypoplasia, a thin upper lip, a smooth philtrum, and low-set, prominent ears. Males with Seaver–Cassidy syndrome may also experience an underdeveloped shawl scrotum and cryptorchidism. Skeletal anomalies, such genu valgum, hyperextended joints, or cubitus valgus, may also be present.
