= Carpal coalition =

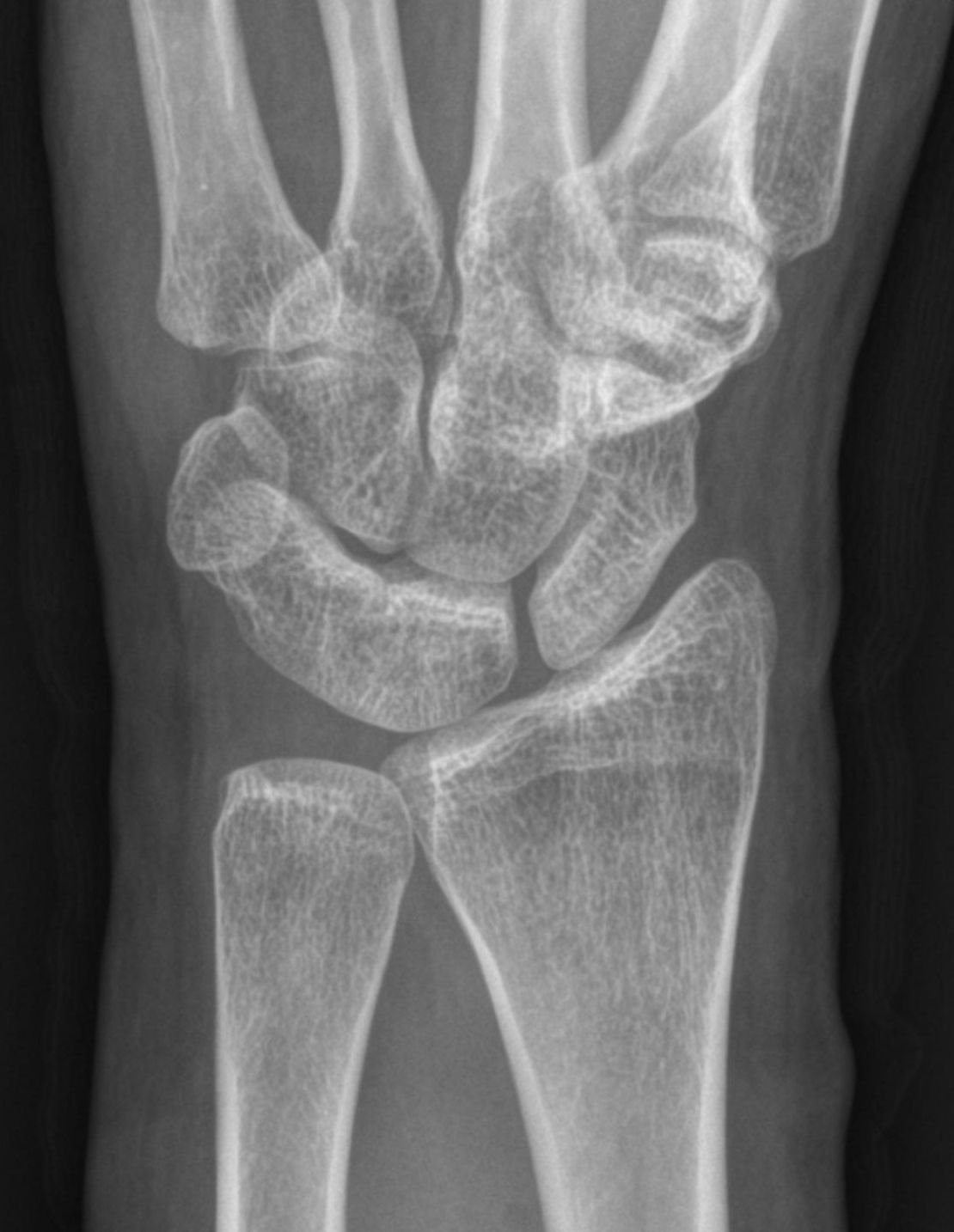
- An example of a lunotriquetral coalition, the most commonly fused carpal bones
- Usual onset: Congenital

Carpal coalition refers to the abnormal fusion of two or more carpal bones that occurs when they fail to separate during intrauterine development. First described by Eduard Sandifort in 1779, carpal coalitions are often an isolated issue which connect two carpal bones in the same row of the wrist. These congenital conditions occur at varying rates across the population.

== Signs and symptoms ==
Patients with carpal coalition often offer no clinical significance and patients rarely have any associated issues. Though infrequent, some patients may complain of pain.

== Causes ==
Carpal coalition result from an incomplete separation of a common embryological carpal precursor in utero, during the fifth to eighth weeks.

== Subtypes ==
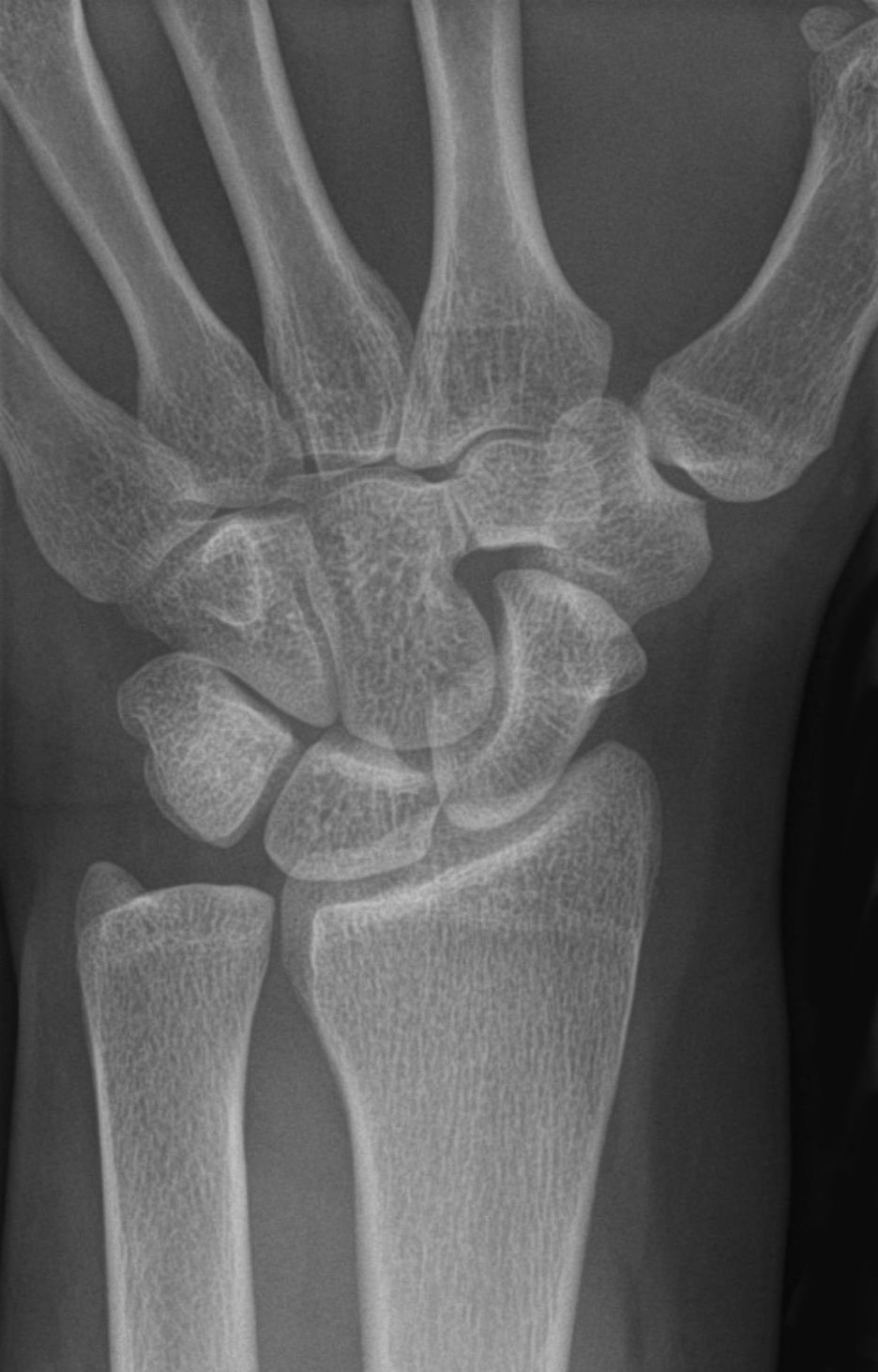
An example of a coalition between the trapezoid and capitate carpal bones

The lunate and triquetral bones are the most common carpal bones to fuse together, resulting in a lunotriquetral coalition in 1% of people. 60% of patients with a lunotriquetral coalition will have it bilaterally. Among isolated incidents the capitate and hamate bones are the next most common to fuse followed by the pisiform-triquetrum, trapezium-trapezoid, scaphoid-capitate, and triquetrum-hamate.

Carpal coalitions may further be divided into four subtypes:

- Type 1 - incomplete fusion with pseudoarthrosis
- Type 2 - fusion with a "notch" between the fused bones
- Type 3 - complete fusion
- Type 4 - complete fusion with other anomalies present

== Treatment ==
Generally since carpal-carpal fusions do not cause unease or discomfort for the patient, and do not impair wrist function, treatment is not needed. However, in the minority of cases where carpal coalition causes persistent pain, arthrodesis, or the surgical fusion of a joint, has been proven to be beneficial.

== Epidemiology ==
Carpal coalition occurs at a ratio of 2:1 in females, and are considered to have a multifactorial inheritance pattern. Further, the incidence according to race varies, with a rate of 0.1% in Caucasian populations, 1.6% in African American populations, and over 8% in certain West African tribes.

== Associated problems ==
Multiple carpal coalitions, or carpal coalitions that connect the two different rows of carpal muscles, are often associated with other anomalies including:

- Ellis–Van Creveld syndrome
- Holt–Oram syndrome
- Turner syndrome

== See also ==
- Tarsal coalition
