= Faciocardiorenal syndrome =

- Other names: Eastman Bixler syndrome
- Medical genetics

Faciocardiorenal syndrome is a rare genetic disorder characterized by facial dysmorphisms, congenital heart defects, and the presence of a horseshoe kidney, alongside intellectual disabilities. Facial dysmorphisms include protruding ears, narrowing of the mouth, cleft palate, hypertelorism, etc. Only 4 cases from the United States, Northern Ireland, and Mexico have been described in the medical literature. Transmission is, presumably, autosomal recessive.
