= Fluorosis =

Fluorosis may refer to:

- Dental fluorosis, a disturbance of dental enamel caused by excessive exposure to high concentrations of fluoride during tooth development.
- Skeletal fluorosis, a bone disease caused by excessive accumulation of fluoride in the bones
- Fluoride toxicity, elevated levels of the fluoride ion in the body
