= Gingival fibromatosis with hypertrichosis =

- Gingival fibromatosis with hypertrichosis is an autosomal dominant condition.
- Specialty: Dermatology

Gingival fibromatosis with hypertrichosis is a cutaneous condition characterized by dark terminal hairs on the peripheral face, central back, and extremities. It is a RASopathy.

== See also ==
- Cantú syndrome
- List of cutaneous conditions
