= FACES syndrome =

- Other names: Friedman-Goodman syndrome

FACES syndrome is a syndrome of unique facial features (facies), anorexia, cachexia, and eye and skin anomalies.

It is a rare disease and estimated to occur in less than 1 in 1 million people.
