= Facial femoral syndrome =

- Other names: Femoral Hyperplasia-Unusual Facies syndrome

Facial femoral syndrome is a rare congenital disorder. It is also known as femoral dysgenesis, bilateral femoral dysgenesis, bilateral-Robin anomaly and femoral hypoplasia-unusual facies syndrome. The main features of this disorder are underdeveloped thigh bones (femurs) and unusual facial features.

== Signs and symptoms ==
- Facial
  - Lips - Cleft palate and/or thin lips. Prominent philtrum
  - Jaw - Small and/or retracted jaw (micrognathia/retrognathia)
  - Ears - Small or virtually absent ears (microtia/anotia)
  - Eyes - Upwardly slanting eyelids
- Skeleton
  - Short limbs (micromelia)
  - Femurs - absent/abnormal
  - Fused bones of the spine (sacrum and coccyx)
  - Deformation of the foot that may be turned outward or inward ((talipes)-varus/valgus)
  - Extra fingers or toes (polydactyly)
  - Abnormal vertebral size or shape
  - Short stature (dwarfism)
- Others
  - Genitourinary abnormalities
  - Underdeveloped lungs
  - Patent ductus arteriosus

Of note intellectual development typically is normal.

== Cause ==
The cause of this condition is not known. A genetic basis is suspected. More than one case have been reported in three families. It seems to be correlated to maternal diabetes mellitus in about a third of patients. There also have been links to maternal drug exposure, viral infections, radiation, and oligohydramnios.

== Diagnosis ==
The diagnosis is based on the combination of unusual facial features and the dysplastic or absent femurs.

Diagnosis may be made antenatally.

== Treatment ==
There is no known specific treatment for this condition. Management is supportive.

== Epidemiology ==
This is a rare disorder with 92 cases reported up to 2017.

== History ==
This condition was first described in 1975.
