= Focal facial dermal dysplasia =

- Other names: FFDD
- Specialty: Dermatology

Focal facial dermal dysplasia is a rare genetically heterogeneous group of disorders that are characterized by congenital bilateral scar like facial lesions, with or without associated facial anomalies. It is characterized by hairless lesions with fingerprint like puckering of the skin, especially at the temples, due to alternating bands of dermal and epidermal atrophy.

This condition is also known as Brauer syndrome (hereditary symmetrical aplastic nevi of temples, bitemporal aplasia cutis congenita, bitemporal aplasia cutis congenita: OMIM 136500) and Setleis syndrome (facial ectodermal dysplasia: OMIM 227260).

== Presentation ==
This condition is characterised by symmetrical lesions on the temples resembling forceps marks. It is characterized a puckered skin due to a virtual absence of subcutaneous fat. It is apparent at birth. Other lesions that may be present include puffy, wrinkled skin around the eyes and/or abnormalities of the eyelashes, eyebrows, and eyelids. The eyebrows may be up-slanting or outward-slanting. Occasionally, the bridge of the nose may appear flat, while the tip may appear unusually rounded. The chin may be furrowed. The upper lip may be prominent with a down-turned mouth. Other features that have been reported include dysplastic and low-set ears, linear radiatory impressions on the forehead, and congenital horizontal nystagmus.

Those with Setleis syndrome may be missing eyelashes on both the upper and lower lids or may have multiple rows of lashes on the upper lids but none on the lower lids.A possible association with intra-abdominal cancer has been reported, but to date this has not been confirmed in other studies.

== Genetics ==
Type II appears to be due to mutations in the transcription factor TWIST2 on chromosome 2.

Type IV is due to mutations in the Cyp26c1 gene.

=== Pathology ===
Under the temporal lesions, the skeletal muscle is almost in direct continuity with the epidermis.

== Diagnosis ==
=== Classification ===
There are at least four types of FFDD:

- Type I: autosomal dominant FFDD
- Type II: autosomal recessive FFDD
- Type III: FFDD with other facial features : Setleis syndrome
- Type IV: facial lesions resembling aplasia cutis in a preauricular distribution along the line of fusion of the maxillary and mandibular prominences. Autosomal recessive.

== History ==
The syndrome was first described by Brauer in 1929 in a large five generation family (38 members). The affected progenitor (Johann Jokeb Van Bargen) was a man who had migrated to Germany from Holland in the 16th century. As many as 155 family members were thought to have been affected.
