= GDF5 =

Protein-coding gene in the species Homo sapiens

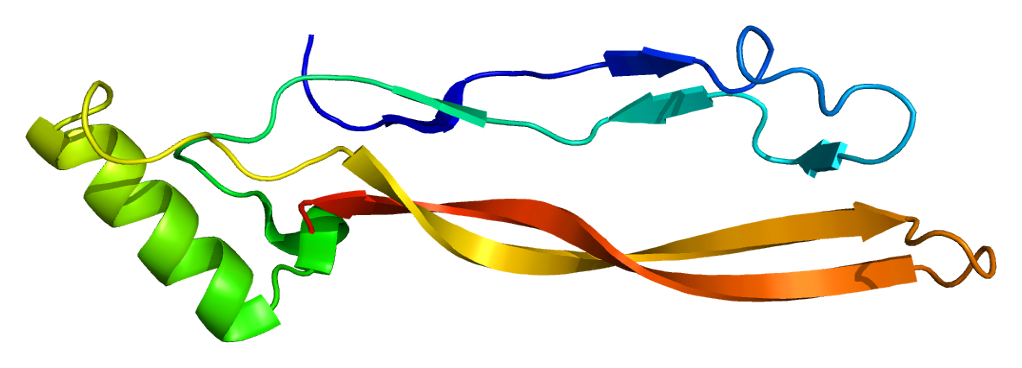

Identifiers
- Aliases: GDF5, BDA1C, BMP-14, BMP14, CDMP1, LAP-4, LAP4, OS5, SYM1B, SYNS2, growth differentiation factor 5, DUPANS
- External IDs: OMIM: 601146; MGI: 95688; GeneCards: GDF5
Available structures
PDB	Ortholog search: PDBe RCSB
PDB	List of PDB id codes 1WAQ, 2BHK, 3EVS, 3QB4

Gene location (Human)
Chr.	Chromosome 20 (human)
Band	20q11.22	Start	35,433,347 bp
Band	20q11.22	End	35,454,746 bp

Gene location (Mouse)
Chr.	Chromosome 2 (mouse)
Band	2 H1|2 77.26 cM	Start	155,782,943 bp
Band	2 H1|2 77.26 cM	End	155,787,287 bp
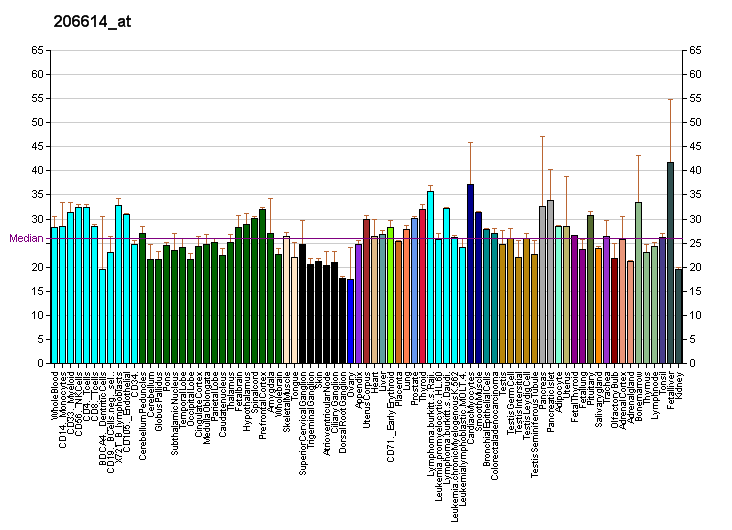
RNA expression pattern
Bgee	Human / Mouse (ortholog); Top expressed in: parotid gland; pericardium; cartilage tissue; synovial joint; synovial membrane; oral mucosa; minor salivary glands; sensory nervous system; pharynx; upper respiratory tract / Top expressed in: finger; elbow; hand joint; joints of the foot; lacrimal gland; interphalangeal joint of hand; parotid gland; annulus fibrosus disci intervertebralis; molar; cuneiform bones; More reference expression data
BioGPS	More reference expression data
Gene ontology
Molecular function	cytokine activity; BMP binding; protein binding; identical protein binding; transforming growth factor beta receptor binding; growth factor activity; signaling receptor binding
Cellular component	membrane; plasma membrane; extracellular region; extracellular space
Biological process	regulation of apoptotic process; negative regulation of neuron apoptotic process; forelimb morphogenesis; negative regulation of mesenchymal cell apoptotic process; regulation of MAPK cascade; SMAD protein signal transduction; chondrocyte differentiation; cell development; regulation of multicellular organism growth; cell-cell signaling; positive regulation of pathway-restricted SMAD protein phosphorylation; hindlimb morphogenesis; chondroblast differentiation; cartilage development; negative regulation of chondrocyte differentiation; transmembrane receptor protein serine/threonine kinase signaling pathway; embryonic limb morphogenesis; positive regulation of chondrocyte differentiation; positive regulation of neuron differentiation; negative regulation of epithelial cell proliferation; positive regulation of BMP signaling pathway; transforming growth factor beta receptor signaling pathway; response to mechanical stimulus; ossification involved in bone remodeling; regulation of signaling receptor activity; regulation of SMAD protein signal transduction; BMP signaling pathway
Sources:Amigo / QuickGO
Orthologs
Databases	NCBI: entry; OMA: entry
Species	Human	Mouse
Entrez	8200	14563
Ensembl	ENSG00000125965	ENSMUSG00000038259
UniProt	P43026	P43027
RefSeq (mRNA)	NM_000557; NM_001319138	NM_008109
RefSeq (protein)	NP_000548; NP_001306067	NP_032135
Location (UCSC)	Chr 20: 35.43 – 35.45 Mb	Chr 2: 155.78 – 155.79 Mb
PubMed search
- Wikidata
View/Edit Human	View/Edit Mouse

Growth/differentiation factor 5 is a protein that in humans is encoded by the GDF5 gene.

The protein encoded by this gene is closely related to the bone morphogenetic protein (BMP) family and is a member of the TGF-beta superfamily. This group of proteins is characterized by a polybasic proteolytic processing site which is cleaved to produce a mature protein containing seven conserved cysteine residues. The members of this family are regulators of cell growth and differentiation in both embryonic and adult tissues. Mutations in this gene are associated with acromesomelic dysplasia, Hunter-Thompson type; brachydactyly, type C; and osteochondrodysplasia, Grebe type. These associations confirm that the gene product plays a role in skeletal development.

GDF5 is expressed in the developing central nervous system, and has a role in skeletal and joint development. It also increases the survival of neurones that respond to the neurotransmitter dopamine, and is a potential therapeutic molecule associated with Parkinson's disease.

== See also ==
- Chondrodysplasia, Grebe type
