= List of medical roots and affixes =

This is a list of roots, suffixes, and prefixes used in medical terminology, their meanings, and their etymologies. Most of them are combining forms in Neo-Latin and hence international scientific vocabulary. There are a few general rules about how they combine. Prefixes and suffixes, most of which are derived from ancient Greek or classical Latin, have a droppable vowel, usually -o-. Generally, this vowel acts as a joint-stem to connect two consonantal roots (e.g. arthr- + -o- + -logy = arthrology), but the -o- is typically dropped when connecting to a vowel-stem (e.g. arthr- + -itis = arthritis, instead of arthr-o-itis).

== Prefixes and suffixes ==
The following is an alphabetical list of medical prefixes and suffixes, along with their meanings, origins, and English examples.

=== A ===
Affix	Meaning	Origin language and etymology	Example(s)
a-, an-	not, without (alpha privative)	Greek ἀ-/ἀν- (a-/an-), not, without	analgesic, apathy, anencephaly
ab-	from; away from	Latin	abduction, abdomen
abdomin-	of or relating to the abdomen	Latin abdōmen, abdomen, fat around the belly	abdominoplasty
-ac	pertaining to; one afflicted with	Greek -ακός (-akós)	cardiac, celiac
acanth-	thorn or spine	Greek ἄκανθα (ákantha), thorn	acanthocyte, acanthoma
acou-	of or relating to hearing	Greek ἀκούειν (akoúein), ἀκουστικός (akoustikós), of or for hearing	acoustician
acr-	extremity, topmost	Greek ἄκρον (ákron), highest or farthest point	acromegaly, acroosteolysis, acrosome
-acusis	hearing	Greek ἀκουστικός (akoustikós), of or for hearing	hyperacusis
-ad	toward, in the direction of	Latin ad, toward, to	dorsad, ventrad
ad-	at, increase, on, toward	Latin ad-, to	adduction
aden-	of or relating to a gland	Greek ἀδήν, ἀδέν-, (adḗn, adén-), an acorn; a gland	adenocarcinoma, adenology
adip-	of or relating to fat or fatty tissue	Latin adeps, adip-, fat	adipocyte
adren-	of or relating to the adrenal glands	Latin ad + rēnēs, kidneys	adrenal artery, adrenaline, adrenochrome
-aemia, -ema, haemat- (BrE)	blood condition	Greek ἀναιμία (anaimía), without blood	anaemia
aer(o)-	air, gas	Greek ἀήρ, ἀέρος (aḗr, aéros)	aerosinusitis, aerophagia
aesthesi- (BrE)	sensation	Greek αἴσθησις (aísthēsis)	anaesthesia
-al	pertaining to	Latin -alis	abdominal, femoral
alb-	denoting a white or pale color	Latin albus, white	albino, tunica albuginea
alge(si)-	pain	Greek ἄλγος (álgos)	analgesic
-algia, alg(i)-, alg(o)-	pain	Greek	myalgia
all-	denoting something as different, or as an addition	Greek ἄλλος (állos), another, other	alloantigen, allopathy
ambi-	denoting something as positioned on both sides; describing both of two	Latin ambi-, ambo, both, on both sides	ambidextrous
amnio-	Pertaining to the membranous fetal sac (amnion)	Greek ἀμνίον (ámnion)	amniocentesis
amph(i)-	on both sides	Greek ἀμφί (amphí)	amphismela, amphiarthrosis
amyl(o)-	starchy, carbohydrate-related	Latin amylum, starch	amylase, amylophagia
an-	not, without (alpha privative)	Greek	analgesia
ana-	back, again, up	Greek ἀνα- (ana-)	anaplasia
an-	anus	Latin	anal
andr-	pertaining to a man	Greek ἀνήρ, ἀνδρ- (anḗr, andr-), male	android, andrology, androgen
angi-	blood vessel	Greek ἀγγεῖον (angeîon)	angiogram, angioplasty
aniso-	describing something as unequal	Greek ἄνισος (ánisos), unequal	anisocytosis, anisotropic
ankyl-, ancyl-	denoting something as crooked or bent	Greek ἀγκύλος (ankúlos), crooked, curved	ankylosis
ante-	describing something as positioned in front of another thing	Latin āntē, before, in front of	antepartum
anthropo-	human	Greek ἄνθρωπος (ánthrōpos), human	anthropology
anti-	describing something as 'against' or 'opposed to' another	Greek ἀντί (antí), against	antibody, antipsychotic
apo-	away, separated from, derived from	Greek ἀπό (apó)	apoptosis, apocrine
archi-	first, primitive	Greek ἀρχι- (arkhi-)	archinephros
arsen(o)-	of or pertaining to a male; masculine	Greek ἀρσενικός (arsenikós)	arsenoblast
arteri(o)-	of or pertaining to an artery	Greek ἀρτηρία (artēría), a wind-pipe, artery (used distinctly versus a vein)	arteriole
arthr-	of or pertaining to the joints, limbs	Greek ἄρθρον (árthron), a joint, limb	arthritis
articul-	joint	Latin articulus	articulation
-ary	pertaining to	Latin -arius	biliary tract, coronary
-ase	enzyme	from Greek διάστασις (δια- (dia-, part, apart) + στάσις (stásis, stand)), division	lactase
-asthenia	weakness	Greek ἀσθένεια (asthéneia), sick, weak	myasthenia gravis
atel(o)-	imperfect or incomplete development	Greek ἀτελής (atelḗs), without end, incomplete	atelectasis
ather-	fatty deposit, soft gruel-like deposit	ἀθάρη (athárē)	atherosclerosis
-ation	process	Latin	medication, eburnation
atri-	an atrium (esp. heart atrium)	Latin	atrioventricular
aur-	of or pertaining to the ear	Latin auris, the ear	aural
aut-	self	Greek αὐτός, αὐτο- (autós, auto-)	autoimmune, autophagy
aux(o)-	increase; growth	Greek αὐξάνω, αὔξω (auxánō, aúxō)	auxotrophy, auxology
axill-	of or pertaining to the armpit (uncommon as a prefix)	Latin axilla, armpit	axilla
azo(to)-	nitrogenous compound	French azote, nitrogen; from Greek άζωτικός (ázōtikós) ἀ- (a-, no, without) + ζωή (zōḗ, life)), mephitic air	azotemia

=== B ===
Affix	Meaning	Origin language and etymology	Example(s)
bacillo-	rod-shaped, typically referring to Bacillus spp.	Latin baculus, stick	bacillomycin
bacteri-	Pertaining to bacteria	Latin bacterium; Greek βακτήριον (baktḗrion), small staff	bacteriophage, bactericide
balan-	of the glans penis or glans clitoridis	Greek βάλανος (bálanos), acorn, glans	balanitis
bas-	of or pertaining to base	Greek βάσις (básis), foundation, base	basolateral
bi-	twice, double	Latin bi-	binary vision, bicycle, bisexual
bio-	life	Greek βίος (bíos)	biology, biological
blast-	germinate or bud	Greek βλαστός (blastós)	blastomere
blephar(o)-	of or pertaining to the eyelid	Greek βλέφαρον (blépharon), eyelid	blepharoplasty
brachi(o)-	of or relating to the arm	Latin bracchium, from Greek βραχίων (brakhíōn), arm	brachium of inferior colliculus
brachy-	indicating 'short' or less commonly 'little'	Greek βραχύς (brakhús), short, little, shallow	brachycephalic
brady-	slow	Greek βραδύς (bradús), slow	bradycardia, bradyzoite
bronch(i)-	of or relating to the bronchus	Latin bronchus; Greek βρόγχος (brónkhos), windpipe	bronchitis, bronchiolitis obliterans
bucc(o)-	of or pertaining to the cheek	Latin bucca, cheek	buccolabial
burs(o)-	bursa (fluid sac between the bones)	Latin bursa, purse; Greek βύρσα (búrsa), hide, wine-skin	bursa, bursitis

=== C ===
Affix	Meaning	Origin language and etymology	Example(s)
capill-	of or pertaining to hair	Latin capillus, hair	capillus
capit-	pertaining to the head as a whole	Latin caput, capit-, the head	capitation, decapitation
carcin-	cancer	Greek καρκίνος (karkínos), crab	carcinoma
cardi-	of or pertaining to the heart	Greek καρδία (kardía), heart	cardiology
carp-	of or pertaining to the wrist	Latin carpus < Greek καρπός (karpós), wrist; NOTE: This root should not be confused with the mirror root carp(o)- meaning fruit.	carpal, carpopedal spasm, metacarpal
cata-	down, under	Greek κατά (katá)	catabolism, catacombs, cataract
-cele	pouching, hernia	Greek κήλη (kḗlē)	hydrocele, varicocele
-centesis	surgical puncture for aspiration	Greek κέντησις (kéntēsis)	amniocentesis, thoracentesis
cephal(o)-	of or pertaining to the head (as a whole)	Greek κεφαλή (kephalḗ), the head	cephalalgia, hydrocephalus
cerat(o)-	of or pertaining to the cornu; a horn	Greek κέρας, κερατ- (kéras, kerat-), a horn	ceratoid
cerebell(o)-	of or pertaining to the cerebellum	Latin cerebellum, little brain	cerebellum
cerebr(o)-	of or pertaining to the brain	Latin cerebrum, brain	cerebrology
cervic-	of or pertaining to the neck or the cervix	Latin cervix, cervīc-), neck, cervix	cervical vertebrae, cervicodorsal
cheil-	of or pertaining to the lips	Greek χεῖλος (kheîlos), lip, mouth, beak	angular cheilitis
chem(o)-	chemistry, drug	Greek χημεία (khēmeía)	chemical, chemistry, chemotherapy
chir-, cheir-	of or pertaining to the hand	Greek χείρ, χειρο- (kheír, kheiro-), hand	chiropractor
chlor-	denoting a green color	Greek χλωρός (khlōrós), green, yellow-green	chlorophyll
bil(i)-, chol(e)-	of or pertaining to bile	Greek χολή (kholḗ), bile	cholaemia (UK) / cholemia (US), cholecystitis
cholecyst(o)-	of or pertaining to the gallbladder	Greek χοληκύστις (kholēkústis), gallbladder < χολή (kholḗ), bile, gall + κύστις (kústis), bladder	cholecystectomy
chondr(i)-, chondr(o)-	cartilage, gristle, granule, granular	Greek χονδρός (khondrós)	chondrocalcinosis
chrom(ato)-	color	Greek χρῶμα (khrôma)	hemochromatosis
-cidal, -cide	killing, destroying	Latin -cīda, cutter, killer	bacteriocidal, suicide, suicidal
cili-	of or pertaining to the cilia, the eyelashes; eyelids	Latin cilium, eyelash; eyelid	ciliary
circum-	denoting something as 'around' another	Latin circum, around	circumcision
cis-	on this side	Latin cis	cisgender
-clast	break	Greek κλαστός (klastós), broken	osteoclast
clostr-	spindle	Greek κλωστήρ (klōstḗr), spindle, thread	Clostridium
co-	with, together, in association	Latin co-	coenzymes, co-organization
-coccus, -coccal	round, spherical	Greek κόκκος (kókkos), berry, seed	Streptococcus
col-, colo-, colono-	colon	Greek κόλον (kólon)	colonoscopy
colp-	of or pertaining to the vagina	Greek κόλπος (kólpos), bosom, womb; hollow, depth	colposcopy
com-	with, together	Latin cum	communicate
contra-	against	Latin contrā	contraindication
cor-	with, together	Latin cor-	corrective
cor-	of or pertaining to the eye's pupil	Greek κόρη (kórē), girl, doll; pupil of the eye	corectomy
cord(i)-	of or pertaining to the heart (uncommon as a prefix)	Latin cor, heart	commotio cordis,
cornu-	applied to describing processes and parts of the body as likened or similar to horns	Latin cornū, horn	greater cornu
coron-	pertaining to the heart	Latin corōna	coronary heart disease
cortic-	cortex, outer region	Latin cortex, bark of a tree	corticosteroid
cost-	of or pertaining to the ribs	Latin costa, rib	costochondral
cox-	of or relating to the hip, haunch, or hip-joint	Latin coxa, hip	coxopodite
crani(o)-	belonging or relating to the cranium	Latin cranium, from Greek κρᾱνίον (krāníon), cranium, skull, bones enclosing the brain	craniology
-crine, crin(o)-	to secrete	Greek κρίνω (krínō), separate, divide, discern	endocrine
cry(o)-	cold	Greek κρύος (krúos), cold, frost	cryoablation, cryogenic
cutane-	skin	Latin cutis	subcutaneous
cyan(o)-	having a blue color	Greek κύανος, κυάνεος (kúanos, kuáneos, blue, of the color blue)	cyanopsia, cyanosis
cycl-	circle, cycle	Greek κύκλος (kúklos)	cyclosis, cyclops, tricycle
cyph(o)-	denotes something as bent (uncommon as a prefix)	Greek κυφός (kuphós), bent, hunchback	cyphosis
cyst(o)-, cyst(i)-	of or pertaining to the urinary bladder	Greek κύστις (kústis), bladder, cyst	cystostomy
cotr(o)-, cin-	yellow blood	Greek, (ko), yellow, (tro, cin), blood	cotrocyte, cinostomy
cyt(o)-, -cyte	cell	Greek κύτος (kútos), a hollow, vessel	cytokine, leukocyte, cytoplasm

=== D ===
Affix	Meaning	Origin language and etymology	Example(s)
dacry(o)-	of or pertaining to tears	Greek δάκρυ, tear	dacryoadenitis, dacryocystitis
-dactyl(o)-	of or pertaining to a finger, toe	Greek δάκτυλος (dáktulos), finger, toe	dactylology, polydactyly
de-	from, down, or away from	Latin de-	dehydrate, demonetize, demotion
dent-	of or pertaining to teeth	Latin dens, dentis, tooth	dentifrice, dentist, dentition, dental
dermat(o)-, derm(o)-	of or pertaining to the skin	Greek δέρμα, δέρματος (dérma, dérmatos), skin, human skin	dermatology, epidermis, hypodermic, xeroderma
-desis	binding	Greek δέσις (désis)	arthrodesis
dextr(o)-	right, on the right side	Latin dexter	dextrocardia
di-	two	Greek δι-	diplopia,
di-, dif-, dis-	apart, separation, taking apart	Latin dis-, dif-, di-	dilation, distal, dilute, different, dissection
dia-	through, during, across	Greek διά (diá), through, during, across	dialysis
digit-	of or pertaining to the finger [rare as a root]	Latin digitus, finger, toe	digit
diplo-	twofold	Greek διπλόος (diplóos)	diploid, diplosis
-dipsia	(condition of) thirst	Greek δίψα (dípsa)	dipsomania, hydroadipsia, oligodipsia, polydipsia
dors(o)-, dors(i)-	of or pertaining to the back	Latin dorsum, back	dorsal, dorsocephalad
drom(o)-, drom(e)-	running, conduction, course	Greek δρόμος (drómos)	dromotropic, syndrome
duodeno-	twelve	Latin duodeni	duodenal atresia, duodenum
dura-	hard	Latin durus	dura mater
dynam(o)-	force, energy, power	Greek δύναμις (dúnamis)	hand strength dynamometer, dynamics
-dynia	pain	Greek ὀδύνη (odúnē)	vulvodynia
dys-	bad, difficult, defective, abnormal	Greek δυσ- (dus-)	dysentery, dysphagia, dysphasia

=== E ===
Affix	Meaning	Origin language and etymology	Example(s)
-eal (see -al)	pertaining to	English -al, from Latin -ālis	adenohypophyseal, corneal, esophageal, perineal
ec-	out, away	Greek ἐκ (ek), out of, from	ectopia, ectopic pregnancy
ect(o)-	outer, outside	Greek ἐκτός (ektós)	ectoblast, ectoderm, ectoplasm
-ectasia, -ectasis	expansion, dilation	Greek ἔκτασις (éktasis)	bronchiectasis, telangiectasia
-ectomy	denotes a surgical operation or removal of a body part; resection, excision	Greek ἐκτομή (ektomḗ), excision	mastectomy
-edema	swelling	Greek οἴδημα (oídēma), swelling	lymphedema, lipedema
-emesis	vomiting condition	Greek ἕμεσις (hémesis)	hematemesis
-emia	blood condition (Am. Engl.)	Greek αἷμα (haîma), "blood"	anemia
encephal(o)-	of or pertaining to the brain; see also cerebro-	Greek ἐγκέφαλος (enképhalos), the brain	encephalogram
endo-	denotes something as inside or within	Greek ἔνδον (éndon), inside, internal	endocrinology, endospore, endoskeleton
eosin(o)-	having a red color	Greek ἠώς (ēṓs), dawn, daybreak, morning red, goddess of the dawn (Ἠώς, Ēṓs)	eosinophil granulocyte
enter(o)-	of or pertaining to the intestine	Greek ἔντερον (énteron), intestine	gastroenterology
epi-	on, upon	Greek ἐπι- (epi-), before, upon, on, outside, outside of	epicardium, epidermis, epidural, episclera, epistaxis, epidemic
episi(o)-	of or pertaining to the pubic region, the loins	Greek ἐπίσιον (epísion), the pubic area, loins; vulva	episiotomy
erythr(o)-	having a red color	Greek ἐρυθρός (eruthrós), red	erythrocyte
-esophageal, -esophago-	gullet (AmE)	Greek οἰσοφάγος (oisophágos)	esophagus
esthesio-	sensation (AmE)	Greek αἴσθησις (aísthēsis), to perceive	esthesioneuroblastoma, esthesia
eu-	true, good, well, normal	εὖ (eû)	eukaryote, euglycemia
ex-	out of, away from, to remove	Latin ex-	excision, exsanguination
exo-	denotes something as "outside" another	Greek ἔξω (éxō), outside of, external	exophthalmos, exoskeleton, exoplanet
extra-	outside	Latin extra, outside of, beyond	extradural hematoma extraordinary

=== F ===
Affix	Meaning	Origin language and etymology	Example(s)
faci-	of or pertaining to the face	Latin faciēs, the face, countenance	faciocardiorenal syndrome, facial
fibr-	fiber	Latin fibra, fiber, filament, entrails	fibril, fibrin, fibrinous pericarditis, fibroblast, fibrosis
fil-	fine, hair-like	Latin fīlum, thread	myofilament, filum terminale
foramino-	hole, opening, or aperture, particularly in bone	Latin forāmen	foraminotomy
-form	used to form adjectives indicating "having the form of"	Latin fōrma, form, shape	cruciform, cuneiform, falciform
fore-	before or ahead	Old English fōr(e)-, before, in front of	foregut
front-	of or pertaining to the forehead	Latin frōns, front-, the forehead	frontotemporal dementia

=== G ===
Affix	Meaning	Origin language and etymology	Example(s)
galact-	milk	Greek γάλα, γαλακτ- (gála, galakt-)	galactorrhea
gastr-	of or pertaining to the stomach	Greek γαστήρ, γαστρ- (gastḗr, gastr-), stomach, belly	gastroenterology, gastropod
-gen	*born in, from: of a certain kind	Greek -γενής (-genḗs), from γεν-νάειν (gen-náein), to be born	*endogen: heterogenous
-genic	formative; pertaining to producing	Greek -γενής (-genḗs)	cardiogenic shock
genu-	of or pertaining to the knee	Latin genū, knee	genu valgum
-geusia	taste	Greek γεῦσις (geûsis)	ageusia, dysgeusia, hypergeusia, hypogeusia, parageusia
gingiv-	of or pertaining to the gums	Latin gingīva, gum	gingivitis
glauc(o)-	Having a grey or bluish-grey colour	Greek γλαυκός (glaukós), grey, bluish-grey	glaucoma
gloss(o)-, glott(o)-	of or pertaining to the tongue	Greek γλῶσσα, γλῶττα (glôssa, glôtta), tongue	glossology
gluco-	sweet	Greek γλυκύς (glukús), sweet	glucocorticoid, glucose
glyc-	sugar	Greek γλυκύς (glukús), sweet	glycolysis
gnath-	of or pertaining to the jaw	Greek γνάθος (gnáthos), jaw	gnathodynamometer
-gnosis	knowledge	Greek γνῶσις (gnôsis), inquiry, knowledge	diagnosis, prognosis
gon-	seed, semen; reproductive	Greek γόνος (gónos), fruit, seed, procreating	gonorrhea
-gram, -gramme	record or picture	Greek γράμμα (grámma), picture, letter, writing	angiogram, sonogram
-graph	instrument used to record data or picture	Greek -γραφία (-graphía), written, drawn, graphic interpretation	electrocardiograph, electromyograph
-graphy	process of recording	Greek -γραφία (-graphía), written, drawn, graphic interpretation	angiography
gyno-, gynaeco- (BrE), gyneco- (AmE)	woman	Greek γυνή, γυναικ (gunḗ, gunaik)	gynaecology, gynecomastia, gynoecium

=== H ===
Affix	Meaning	Origin language and etymology	Example(s)
halluc-	to wander in mind	Latin ālūcinor, to wander in mind	hallucinosis, hallucination
hem(at)-, haem(ato)-	of or pertaining to blood	Latin hæma, from Greek αἷμα, αἱματ- (grc), blood	hematology, older form haematology
hema-, hemo-	blood (AmE)	Greek αἷμα, (grc), blood	hemal, hemoglobin
hemangi(o)-	blood vessels	Greek αἷμα, (grc), blood, + ἀγγεῖον (angeîon), vessel, urn	hemangioma
hemi-	one-half	Greek ἡμι- (hēmi-), half	cerebral hemisphere
hepat-, hepatic-	of or pertaining to the liver	Greek ἧπαρ, ἠπᾰτ- (hêpar, ēpat-), the liver	hepatology, hepatitis
heter(o)-	denotes something as "the other" (of two), as an addition, or different	Greek ἕτερος (héteros), the other (of two), another; different	heterogeneous
hidr(o)-	sweat	Greek ἱδρώς, ἱδρωτ- (hidrṓs, hidrōt-), sweat, perspiration	hyperhidrosis
hist(o)-, histio-	tissue	Greek ἱστός (histós), web, tissue	histology
home(o)-	similar	Greek ὅμοιος (homoios), like, resembling, similar	homeopathy
hom(o)-	denotes something as "the same" as another or common	Greek ὁμός (homós), the same, common	homosexuality, homozygote, homophobic
humer(o)-	of or pertaining to the shoulder (or [rarely] the upper arm)	Latin umerus, shoulder	humerus
hydr(o)-	water	Greek ὕδωρ (húdōr), water	hydrophobe, hydrogen
hyper-	extreme or beyond normal	Greek ὑπέρ (hupér), over, above; beyond, to the extreme	hypertension, hypertrichosis
hyp(o)-	below	Greek ὑπό, ὑπο- (hupó), below, under	hypovolemia, hypoxia, hypoglossal nerve
hyster(o)-	of or pertaining to the womb or the uterus	Greek ὑστέρα (hustéra), womb	hysterectomy, hysteria

=== I ===
Affix	Meaning	Origin language and etymology	Example(s)
-ia	indicates a disease or abnormal condition	Latin and Greek	anemia
-iasis	condition, formation, or presence of	Latin -iasis, pathological condition or process; from Greek ἴασις (íasis), cure, repair, mend	mydriasis
iatr(o)-	of or pertaining to medicine or a physician (uncommon as a prefix but common as a suffix; see -iatry)	Greek ἰατρός (iatrós), healer, physician	iatrochemistry, iatrogenesis
-iatry	denotes a field in medicine emphasizing a certain body component	Greek ἰατρός (iatrós), healer, physician	podiatry, psychiatry
-ic	pertaining to	Greek -ικός (-ikós)	hepatic artery
-ics	organized knowledge, treatment	Latin -icus, collection of related things, theme; cognate with Greek -ικός (ikós), of, pertaining to	obstetrics
idio-	self, one's own	Greek ἴδιος (ídios), one's own	idiopathic
ileo-	ileum	Greek εἰλεός (eileós), to shut in, intestinal obstruction	ileocecal valve
ilio-	ilium	Latin groin or flank	iliocostalis
infra-	below	Latin īnfrā, below	infrahyoid muscles
inter-	between, among	Latin inter	interarticular ligament
intra-	within	Latin intrā	intramural
ipsi-	same	Latin ipsi-	ipsilateral
irid(o)-	of or pertaining to the iris	Latin īrīs, rainbow; from Greek ἶρις (îris), rainbow	iridectomy
isch-	restriction	Greek ἴσχω (ískhō), hold back, restrain	ischemia
ischio-	of or pertaining to the ischium, the hip-joint	Greek ἰσχίον (iskhíon), hip-joint, ischium	ischioanal fossa
-ine	of or pertaining to	Latin -īnus, of or pertaining to; cognate with Greek -ινος, added to form adjectives relating to material, time, and so on	morphine, masculine/feminine
-ism	condition, state of things, sometimes (though not necessarily) disease	Greek -ισμός (-ismós), suffix forming abstract nouns of state, condition, doctrine	bipedalism, organism, metabolism, giantism, dwarfism
-ismus	spasm, contraction	Greek -ισμός	hemiballismus
iso-	equal	Greek ἴσος (ísos), equal	isotonic
-ist	one who specializes in	Greek -ιστής (-istḗs), agent noun, one who practices	pathologist
-ite	the nature of, resembling	Latin -ītēs, those belonging to, from Greek -ίτης (-ítēs)	dendrite
-itis	inflammation	Greek -ῖτις (-îtis) fem. form of -ίτης (-ítēs), pertaining to, because it was used with the feminine noun νόσος (nósos, disease), thus -îtis nósos, disease of the, disease pertaining to	tonsillitis
-ium	structure, tissue	Latin -ium, aggregation or mass of (such as tissue)	pericardium

=== J–K ===
Affix	Meaning	Origin language and etymology	Example(s)
juxta-	near to, alongside, or next to	Latin iuxta	juxtaglomerular apparatus
kal-	potassium	New Latin kalium, potassium	hyperkalemia
kary-	nucleus	Greek κάρυον (káruon), nut	eukaryote
kerat-	cornea (eye or skin)	Greek κέρας (kéras), horn	keratoscope
kine-	movement	Greek κινέω (kinéō), to move, to change	akinetopsia, kinesthesia
koil-	hollow	Greek κοῖλος (koîlos)	koilocyte
kyph-	humped	Greek κυφός (kuphós), bent forward, stooping, hunchbacked	kyphoscoliosis

=== L ===
Affix	Meaning	Origin language and etymology	Example(s)
labi-	of or pertaining to the lip	Latin labia, labium, lip	labiodental
lacrim(o)-	tear	Latin lacrima, tear from crying	Lacrimal canaliculi
lact(i)-, lact(o)	milk	Latin lac, milk	lactation, lactose
lapar(o)-	of or pertaining to the abdominal wall, flank	Greek λαπάρα (lapára), flank	laparotomy
laryng(o)-	of or pertaining to the larynx, the lower throat cavity where the voice box is	Greek λᾰ́ρυγξ, (lárunx), throat, gullet	laryngoscopy
latero-	lateral	Latin laterālis, lateral, of or belonging to the side	lateral pectoral nerve
lei(o)-	smooth	Greek λεῖος (leîos), smooth	leiomyoma
-lepsis, -lepsy, -leps-	attack, seizure	Greek λῆψις (lêpsis), seizure	epilepsy, narcolepsy
lept(o)-	light, slender	Greek λεπτός (leptós), thin, lean	leptomeningeal
leuc(o)-, leuk(o)-	denoting a white color	Greek λευκός (leukós), white, bright, pale	leukocyte
lingu(a)-, lingu(o)-	of or pertaining to the tongue	Latin lingua, tongue, speech, language	linguistics
lip(o)-	fat	Greek λίπος (lípos), fat, lard	liposuction
liss(os)-	smooth	Greek Λισσός (Lissós), smooth	lissencephaly
lith(o)-	stone, calculus	Greek λῐ́θος (líthos)	lithotripsy
log(o)-	speech	Greek λόγος (lógos)	Logopenic progressive aphasia
-logist	denotes someone who studies a certain field (the field of _____-logy); a specialist; one who treats	Greek λογιστής (logistḗs), studier, practitioner (lit., accountant)	oncologist, pathologist
-logy	denotes the academic study or practice of a certain field; the study of	Greek -λογῐ́ᾱ (-logíā) base noun for the study of something	hematology, urology
lumb(o)-, lumb(a)-	of or relating to the part of the trunk between the lowest ribs and the pelvis.	Latin lumbus or lumbaris, loin	lumbosacral plexus
lymph(o)-	lymph	Latin lympha, water	lymphedema
lys(o)-, -lytic	dissolution	Greek λῠ́σῐς (lúsis), loosen, release, + -ic	lysosome
-lysis	destruction, separation	Greek λῠ́σῐς (lúsis), loosen, release	paralysis

=== M ===
Affix	Meaning	Origin language and etymology	Example(s)
macr(o)-	large, long	Greek μᾰκρός (makrós), long, tall	macrophage
-malacia	softening	Greek μαλακία (malakía), soft, weak, self-indulgent	osteomalacia
mamm(o)-	of or pertaining to the breast	Latin mamma, breast, udder	mammogram
mammill(o)-	of or pertaining to the nipple	Latin mammilla, nipple	mammillaplasty, mammillitis
manu-	of or pertaining to the hand	Latin manus, hand	manufacture
mast(o)-	of or pertaining to the breast	Greek μαστός (mastós), breast, woman's breast, man's pectoral muscle	mastectomy
meg(a)-, megal(o)-, -megaly	enlargement, million	Greek μέγᾰς (mégas), big, large, great, mighty	splenomegaly, megameter
melan(o)-	having a black color	Greek μέλᾱς, μελανο- (mélās, melano-), black, dark	melanin
melos	extremity	Greek μέλος (mélos), part of a body, limb, member	erythromelalgia
mening(o)-	membrane	Greek μῆνῐγξ (mêninx)	meninges, meningitis
men-	month, menstrual cycle	Greek μήν (mḗn), month	menopause, menorrhagia
mer(o)-	part	Greek μέρος (méros), part, component, region	merocrine, meroblastic
mes-	middle	Greek μέσος (mésos), middle, between, half	mesoderm, mesothelium
met(a)-	after, beside, beyond or change	Greek μετᾰ́ (metá), with, among, along with, in common with	metacarpal, metacarpus, metanephros, metatheria
-meter	instrument used to measure or count	Greek μέτρον (métron), measure or property, something used to measure	sphygmomanometer, thermometer
-metry	process of measuring, -meter + -y (see -meter)	Greek μέτρον (métron)	optometry
metr-	pertaining to conditions or instruments of the uterus	Greek μήτρᾱ (mḗtrā), womb, uterus	metrorrhagia
micr-	millionth; denoting something as small, relating to smallness	Greek μῑκρός (mīkrós), small	microscope
milli-	thousandth	Latin mille, thousand	milliliter
mon-	single	Greek μονός (monós)	infectious mononucleosis
morph-	form, shape	Greek μορφή (morphḗ)	morphology
muscul(o)-	muscle	Latin mūsculus, muscle (lit. mouse-like, due to mouse-shaped appearance of some muscles; loanword from Greek μῦς (mûs), mouse, + Latin -culus, diminutive suffix)	musculoskeletal system
my(o)-	of or relating to muscle	Greek μῦς, μυ- (mûs, mu-), muscle, mouse, mussel	myoblast
myc(o)-	fungus	Greek μύκης, μυκητ- (múkēs, mukēt-), mushroom or fungus	onychomycosis, otomycosis
myel(o)-	of or relating to bone marrow or the spinal cord	Greek μυελός (muelós), marrow, bone-marrow	myelin sheath, myeloblast
myl(o)-	of or relating to molar teeth or the lower jaw	Greek μῠ́λη (múlē, mill, grind, molars	mylohyoid nerve
myring(o)-	eardrum	Latin myringa, eardrum	myringotomy
myx(o)-	mucus	Greek μύξᾰ (múxa), mucus, nasal discharge	myxoma

=== N ===
Affix	Meaning	Origin language and etymology	Example(s)
nan(o)-	dwarf, small	Greek νᾶνος (nânos), dwarf	nanogram, nanosecond
narc(o)-	numb, sleep	Greek νάρκη (nárkē), numbess, torpor	narcolepsy
nas(o)-	of or pertaining to the nose	Latin nāsus, nose	nasal
nat(o)-	birth	Latin nātus, born, arisen, made	neonatology
necr(o)-	death	Greek νεκρός (nekrós), dead body, corpse, dying person	necrosis, necrotizing fasciitis
neo-	new	Greek νέος (néos), young, youthful, new, fresh	neoplasm
nephr(o)-	of or pertaining to the kidney	Greek νεφρός (nephrós), kidney	nephrology
nerv-	of or pertaining to nerves and the nervous system (uncommon as a root: neuro- mostly always used)	Latin nervus, tendon, nerve; cognate with Greek νεῦρον (neûron), tendon, string, nerve	nerve, nervous system
neur-	of or pertaining to nerves and the nervous system	Greek νεῦρον (neûron), tendon, sinew, nerve	neurofibromatosis
noci-	pain, injury, hurt	Latin noceō	nociception
norm-, normo-	normal	Latin nōrma, norm or standard; lit. carpenter's square	normocapnia

=== O ===
Affix	Meaning	Origin language and etymology	Example(s)
ocul-	of or pertaining to the eye	Latin oculus, the eye	oculist
odont-	of or pertaining to teeth	Greek ὀδούς, ὀδοντ- (odoús, odont-), tooth	orthodontist
-odyn-	pain	Greek ὀδύνη (odúnē)	allodynia
-oesophageal, oesophago- (BrE)	gullet	Greek οἰσοφᾰ́γος (oisophágos)	oesophagogastroduodenoscopy
-oid	resemblance to	Greek -ειδής (-eidḗs), like, connected to, pertaining to	sarcoidosis
-ole	small or little	Latin -olus, suffix to form a diminutive of the noun	arteriole
olig-	having little, having few	Greek ὀλῐ́γος (olígos), few	oligotrophy
om(o)-	shoulder	Greek ὦμος (ômos), shoulder	omohyoid muscle
-oma (singular), -omata (plural)	tumor, mass, fluid collection	Greek -μα (-ma), suffix added to verbs to form nouns indicating the result of a process or action; cf. English -tion	sarcoma, teratoma, mesothelioma
omphal(o)-	of or pertaining to the navel, the umbilicus	Greek ὀμφαλός (omphalós), navel, belly-button	omphalotomy
onco-	tumor, bulk, volume	Greek ὄγκος (ónkos)	oncology
-one			hormone
onych(o)-	of or pertaining to the nail (of a finger or toe)	Greek ὄνυξ, ὀνυχο- (ónux, onukho-), nail; claw; talon	onychophagy
oo-	of or pertaining to an (egg), a woman's egg, the ovum	Greek ᾠόν, ᾠο- (ōión, ōio-), egg, ovum	oogenesis
oophor(o)-	of or pertaining to the woman's (ovary)	Neoclassical Greek ᾠοφόρον (ōiophóron), ovary, egg-bearing	oophorectomy
ophthalm(o)-	of or pertaining to the (eye)	Greek ὀφθαλμός (ophthalmós), the eye	ophthalmology
opistho-	back, behind, rear	Greek ὄπῐσθεν (ópisthen), behind, at the back	opisthotonus
-opsy	examination or inspection	Greek ὄψῐς (ópsis), view	biopsy, autopsy
optic(o)-	of or relating to chemical properties of the eye	Middle French optique; from Greek ὀπτῐκός (optikós); cognate with Latin oculus, relating to the eye	opticochemical
or(o)-	of or pertaining to the mouth	Latin ōs, ōris, mouth	oral
-or	one who, agent noun–forming suffix	generally appended where Latin would do it—to the root of a Latin-type perfect passive participle. Cf. -er	doctor
orchi(o)-, orchid(o)-, orch(o)-	testis	Greek ὄρχις (órkhis), testicle, ovary	orchiectomy, orchidectomy
orth(o)-	denoting something as straight or correct	Greek ὀρθός (orthós), straight, correct, normal	orthodontist
-osis	a condition, disease, process or increase	Greek -ωσις (-ōsis), state, abnormal condition, action	Harlequin type ichthyosis, psychosis, osteoporosis, phagocytosis
ossi-, osse-	bone, bony	Latin os, bone	peripheral ossifying fibroma, osseous
ost(e)-, oste(o)-	bone	Greek ὀστέον (ostéon), bone	osteoporosis, osteoarthritis
ot(o)-	of or pertaining to the ear	Greek οὖς, ὠτ- (oûs, ōt-), the ear	otology, otosclerosis
-ous	pertaining to	Latin -ōsus, full of, prone to	porous
ovari(o)-	of or pertaining to the ovaries	Latin ōvarium, ovary	ovariectomy
ovo-, ovi-, ov-	of or pertaining to the eggs, the ovum	Latin ōvum, egg, ovum	ovogenesis, ovoviviparity
oxo-, -ox(i)-	oxygen	Greek ὀξύς, sharp, acid	oxidative phosphorylation, oximetry, anoxia, hypoxia, hyperoxia
oxy-	sharp, acid, acute; oxygen	borrowed from French oxygène (originally principe oxigine, 'acidifying principle', referring to oxygen's role in the formation of acids, from Greek ὀξύς (oxús), sharp, pointed + γένος (génos), birth)	oxytocin, oxygenated, oxycodone

=== P ===
Affix	Meaning	Origin language and etymology	Example(s)
pachy-	thick	Greek πᾰχῠ́ς (pakhús), thick, large, stout	pachyderma, pachymeningitis
-pagus	Indicates conjoined twins, with the first part denoting the organs fused	Greek πάγος (págos), fixed, set, fastened	xiphopagus, parapagus dicephalus, craniopagus parasiticus
palpebr-	of or pertaining to the eyelid (uncommon as a root)	Latin palpebra, eyelid	palpebration
pan-, pant(o)-	complete or containing everything, all	Greek πᾶς, παν- (pâs, pan-), all, every	panophobia, panopticon, pancytopenia
papill-	of or pertaining to the nipple (of the chest/breast)	Latin papilla, nipple; diminutive of papula (see below)	papillitis
papul(o)-	small elevation or swelling in the skin, a pimple, swelling	Latin papula, pimple, pustle; a small elevation or swelling in the skin	papulation
para-	alongside of	Greek πᾰρᾰ́ (pará)	parathyroid
-paresis	slight paralysis	Greek πάρεσις (páresis)	hemiparesis
parvo-	small	Latin parvus, small, little, unimportant	Parvovirus
path(o)-	disease	Greek πᾰ́θος (páthos), pain, suffering, condition	pathology
-pathy	disease or disorder	Greek πᾰ́θος (páthos), suffering, accident	sociopathy, neuropathy
pauci-	Few	Latin paucus	pauci-immune
pector-	breast or chest	Latin pectus	expectorant, pectoriloquy
ped-, -ped-, -pes	of or pertaining to the foot; -footed	Latin pēs, pēd-, foot	pedoscope, orthopedic
ped-, pedo-	of or pertaining to the child	Greek παῖς, παιδός (paîs, paidós), child	pediatrics. pedophilia
pelv(i)-, pelv(o)-	hip bone	Latin pelvis, basin	abdominopelvic cavity
-penia	deficiency	Greek πενῐ́ᾱ, poverty, indigence	osteopenia
peo-	of or pertaining to the penis	Greek πέος (péos)	peotomy
-pepsia	relating to digestion or the digestive tract.	Greek πεπτός (peptós), cooked, digested < πέσσω (péssō), I boil, cook; digest	dyspepsia
per-	through	Latin per, through, by means of	percutaneous
peri-	surrounding or around	Greek περῐ́ (perí), around, about, concerning	periodontal
-pexy	fixation	Greek πῆξις (pêxis), fixing in place, fastening	nephropexy
phaco-	lens-shaped	Greek φᾰκός (phakós), lentil-bean	phacolysis, phacoemulsification
-phagia, -phage	eating or ingestion	Greek φαγία (phagía) eating < φᾰγεῖν (phageîn), to eat	trichophagia
-phago-	eating, devouring	Greek -φᾰ́γος (-phágos), eater of, eating	phagocyte
phagist-	eater of	Greek φαγιστής (phagistḗs) eater; see -phagia	geophagist
-phagy	feeding on	Greek φαγία (phagia) eating; see -phagia	hematophagy
phall-	phallus	Greek φαλλός (phallós), penis	aphallia
pharmac-	drug, medication	Greek φάρμᾰκον (phármakon), witchcraft, drug	pharmacology
pharyng-	pertaining to the pharynx	Greek φᾰ́ρῠγξ, φαρυγγ- (phárunx, pharung-), throat, windpipe; chasm	pharyngitis, pharyngotonsillitis
-phil(ia)	attraction for	Greek φῐλῐ́ᾱ (philíā), friendship, love, affection	hemophilia
phleb-	of or pertaining to the (blood) veins, a vein	Greek φλέψ, φλεβ- (phléps, phleb-), blood-vessel, vein	phlebography, phlebotomy
-phobia	exaggerated fear, sensitivity, aversion	Greek φόβος (phóbos), terror, fear, flight, panic	arachnophobia
phon-	sound	Greek φωνή (phōnḗ)	phonocardiogram
phos-	of or pertaining to light or its chemical properties, now historic and used rarely. See the common root phot- below.	Greek φῶς, φᾰ́ος, φωτ- (phôs, pháos), light	phosphene
phot-	of or pertaining to light	Greek φωτω- (phōtō-), < φῶς (phôs), light	photophobia
phren-, phrenic-	the mind	Greek φρήν (phrḗn), intellect, wits, mind	phrenic nerve, schizophrenia
phyllo-	leaf-like	Greek φῠ́λλον (phúllon), leaf, foliage, plant	phyllodes tumour, theophylline
-phyte, phyto-	to grow	Greek φῠτόν (phutón), plant, tree	enthesophyte
piri-	pear-shaped	Latin pirum, cognate with Greek ἄπιον (ápion), pear	piriformis muscle
-plasia	formation, development	Greek πλᾰ́σῐς (plásis), moulding, conformation	achondroplasia
-plasty	surgical repair, reconstruction	Greek πλαστός (plastós), molded, formed	rhinoplasty
-plegia	paralysis	Greek πληγή (plēgḗ), stroke (from a sword), from πληγή (plēgḗ), to strike or smite	paraplegia
pleio-	more, excessive, multiple	Greek πλεῖον (pleîon), more	pleiotropic
pleur-	of or pertaining to the ribs	Greek πλευρᾱ́ (pleurā́), rib, side of the body	pleuropneumonia
-plexy	stroke or seizure	Greek πλήσσω, πλήσσειν (plḗssō, plḗssein), to strike or smite	cataplexy
pne-, pneum-	air, breath, lung	Greek πνεῖν (pneîn), πνεῦμα, πνεύματος (pneûma, pneúmatos), πνεύμων (pneúmōn)	apnea, pneumatology, pneumonocyte, pneumonia
pod-, -pod-, -pus	of or pertaining to the foot, -footed	Greek πούς, ποδ- (poús, pod-), foot	podiatry
-poiesis	production	Greek ποίησις (poíēsis), poetry, poem, creation	hematopoiesis
polio-	having a grey color	Greek πολῐός (poliós), grey, grizzled	poliomyelitis
poly-	many	Greek πολῠ́ς (polús), many, a lot of, large, great	polymyositis
por-	pore, porous	Greek πόρος (póros), passage, passageway	osteoporosis
porphyr-	purple color	Greek πορφύρα (porphúra), Tyrian purple, royal purple	porphyria
post-	after or behind	Latin post, after, behind	postprandial, postmortem
pre-	before in position or time	Middle English pre-, from Medieval Latin pre- < (Classical) Latin prae-, before, in front of	premature birth
presby-	old age	Greek πρέσβυς (présbus), old man, elder	presbyopia, presbycusis
prim-	first or most important	Latin prīmus, first, most important	primiparous
pro-	before	Greek πρό- (pró-), before, in front of	prodromal
proct-	anus, rectum	Greek πρωκτός (prōktós), anus	proctology
prosop-	face	Greek πρόσωπον (prósōpon), face, visage, mask	prosopagnosia
prot-	first or most important	Greek πρωτος (prōtos), first; principal, most important	protoplasm
pseud-	false or fake	Greek ψεύδω (pseúdō), to lie or deceive	pseudoephedrine
psor-	Itching	Greek ψώρα (psṓra), itch, mange, scurvy	psoriasis
psych-	of or pertaining to the mind	Greek ψυχή (psukhḗ), breath, life, soul	psychology, psychiatry
ptero-, ptery-, pterygo-	Pertaining to a wing	Greek πτερόν (pterón), wing, feather	lateral pterygoid plate
-ptosis	falling, drooping, downward placement, prolapse	Greek πτῶσῐς (ptôsis), falling	apoptosis, nephroptosis
-ptyal-, ptyalo-	saliva, salivary glands		ptyalolithiasis
-ptysis	spitting	Greek πτῡ́ω (ptū́ō), to spit up, disgorge; + -σις (-sis).	hemoptysis
pulmon-, pulmo-	of or relating to the lungs	Latin pulmō, a lung	pulmonary
py-	pus	Greek πύον (púon), pus	pyometra
pyel-	pelvis	Greek πύελος (púelos), pelvis, wash basin	pyelonephritis
pykno-	to thicken (as the nucleus does in early stages of cell death)	Greek πύκνωσις (púknōsis), thickening	pyknosis
pylor-	gate	Greek πυλωρός (pulōrós), gate keeper; lower orifice of the stomach	pyloric sphincter
pyr-	fever	Greek πῦρ, πυρετός (pûr, puretós), fire, heat, fever	antipyretic

=== Q–R ===
Affix	Meaning	Origin language and etymology	Example(s)
quadr(i)-	four	Latin quattuor	quadriceps
radi-	radiation	Latin radiō, I radiate, emit beams; from radius, ray of light, spoke of a wheel	radiowave
radic-	referring to the beginning, or the root, of a structure, usually a nerve or a vein	Latin rādīx, root	radiculopathy
re-	again, back	Latin re-	relapse
rect-	rectum	abbr. of New Latin rectum intestinum ('straight intestine') < Latin rēctus, straight	rectal, rectum, rectus femoris
ren(o)-	of or pertaining to the kidney	Latin rēn, rēnes, kidney	renal
reticul(o)-	net	Latin rēticulum	reticulocyte
retro-	backward, behind	Latin retro	retroversion, retroverted
rhabd(o)-	rod shaped, striated	Greek ῥᾰ́βδος (rhábdos), wand, stick, stripe	rhabdomyolysis
rhachi(o)-	spine	Greek ῥάχις (rhákhis), spine or backbone	rachial, rachialgia, rachidian, rachiopathy
rhin(o)-	of or pertaining to the nose	Greek ῥίς, ῥῑνο- (rhís, rhīno-), nose	rhinoceros, rhinoplasty, rhinovirus
rhod(o)-	denoting a rose-red color	Greek ῥόδον (rhódon), rose	rhodophyte
-rrhage, -rrhagia	burst forth, rapid flow (of blood, usually)	Greek -ραγία (-ragía), to break, to burst	hemorrhage, menorrhagia
-rrhaphy	surgical suturing	Greek ῥαφή (rhaphḗ)	hymenorrhaphy, neurorrhaphy
-rrhea (AmE)	flowing, discharge	Greek ῥοίᾱ (rhoíā), flow, flux	galactorrhea, diarrhea
-rrhexis	rupture	Greek ῥῆξῐς (rhêxis), breaking, bursting, discharge	karyorrhexis
-rrhoea (BrE)	flowing, discharge	Greek ῥοίᾱ (rhoíā), flow, flux	diarrhoea
rubr(o)-	of or pertaining to the red nucleus of the brain	Latin ruber, red	rubrospinal
-rupt	break or burst	Latin rumpō	erupt, interrupt

=== S ===
Affix	Meaning	Origin language and etymology	Example(s)
salping(o)-	of or pertaining to tubes, e.g. fallopian tubes	Greek σᾰ́λπῐγξ, σαλπιγγ-, (sálpinx, salping-), trumpet	salpingectomy, salpingopharyngeus muscle
sangui-, sanguine-	of or pertaining to blood	Latin sanguis, blood	sanguine
sapro-	relating to putrefaction or decay	Greek σαπρός (saprós), rotten, putrid	saprogenic
sarco-	muscular, flesh-like	Greek σάρξ (sárx), flesh	sarcoma, sarcoidosis
scapul(o)-	of or pertaining to the scapula	Latin (scapula), shoulder	scapulothoracic, facioscapulohumeral muscular dystrophy
schist(o)-	split, cleft	Greek σχῐστός (skhistós), cloven, divided	schistocyte
schiz(o)-	denoting something "split" or "double-sided"	Greek σχῐ́ζω (skhízō), to split, cleave, part	schizophrenia
scler(o)-	hard	Greek σκληρός (sklērós)	scleroderma
-sclerosis	hardening	Greek σκληρός (sklērós), hard, harden; + -σῐς (-sis), added to verb stems to form abstract nouns or nouns of action, result or process	atherosclerosis, multiple sclerosis
scoli(o)-	twisted	Greek σκολιός (skoliós), curved, bent	scoliosis
-scope	instrument for viewing	Greek σκόπος (skópos), watcher	stethoscope
-scopy	process of viewing	Greek σκοπέω (skopéō), to look at, behold, examine	endoscopy
scoto-	darkness	Greek σκότος (skótos)	scotopic vision
semi-	one-half, partly	Latin semi-	semiconscious
sial(o)-	saliva, salivary gland	Latin salīva, saliva.	sialagogue
sigmoid(o)-	sigmoid, S-shaped curvature	Greek σιγμοειδής (sigmoeidḗs), crescent-shaped, lunate sigma-shaped	sigmoid colon
sinistr(o)-	left, left side	Latin sinister	sinistrocardia
sinus-	of or pertaining to the sinus	Latin sinus, a curve, bend, hollow cavity, bosom	sinusitis
sito-	food, grain	Greek σῖτος (sîtos)	sitophobia
somat(o)-, somatico-	body, bodily	Greek σῶμα (sôma)	somatic
somn(o)	Sleep	Latin somnus, sleep, drowsiness	insomniac
-spadias	slit, fissure	Greek σπάω (spáō), break, split	hypospadias, epispadias
spasmo-	spasm	Greek σπασμός (spasmós)	Spasmodic dysphonia
sperma-, spermo-, spermato-	semen, spermatozoa	Greek σπέρμα (spérma), seed, semen	spermatogenesis
splanchn(i)-, splanchn(o)-	viscera	Greek σπλᾰ́γχνον (splánkhnon), bowels, guts	splanchnology
splen(o)-	spleen	Greek σπλήν, σπλην- (splḗn, splēn-), spleen, milt	splenectomy
spondyl(o)-	of or pertaining to the spine, the vertebra	Greek σφόνδῠλος / σπόνδυλος (sphóndulos, spóndulos), the spine	spondylitis
squamos(o)-	denoting something as "full of scales" or "scaly"	Latin squāmōsus, full of scales, scaly	squamous cell
-stalsis	contraction	Greek στέλλω (stéllō), I dispatch, place, set	peristalsis
-stasis	stopping, standing	Greek στᾰ́σῐς (stásis), to stand, place, set	cytostasis, homeostasis
-statin	maintain cholesterol	Latin (stare), to remain or instill	Statin
-staxis	dripping, trickling	Greek στάζω, στακτός (stázō, staktós), drip, leak, trickle	epistaxis
sten(o)-	denoting something as narrow in shape or pertaining to narrowness	Greek στενός (stenós), narrow, short	stenography
-stenosis	abnormal narrowing of a blood vessel or other tubular organ or structure	Greek στενός (stenós), narrow, short; + -σῐς (-sis), added to verb stems to form abstract nouns or nouns of action, result or process	restenosis, stenosis
steth-	of or pertaining to the upper chest, the area above the breast and under the neck	Greek στῆθος (stêthos), chest, cuirass	stethoscope
stheno-	strength, force, power	Greek σθένος (sthénos)	
stom-, stomat-	of or pertaining to the mouth; an artificially created opening	Greek στόμᾰ, στοματ- (stóma, stomat-), mouth	stomatogastric, stomatognathic system
-stomy	creation of an opening	New Latin stoma, opening; from Greek στόμᾰ (stóma)	colostomy
sub-	beneath, under	Latin sub	subcutaneous tissue
super-	in excess, above, superior	Latin super	superior vena cava
supra-	above, excessive	Latin supra	supraorbital vein
syl-, sym-, syn-, sys-	indicates similarity, likeness, or being together; assimilates before some consonants: before l to syl-, s to sys-, before a labial consonant to sym-	Greek σῠν- (sun-), with, together	symptom, synalgia, synesthesia, syssarcosis

=== T ===
Affix	Meaning	Origin language and etymology	Example(s)
tachy-	denoting something as fast, irregularly fast	Greek τᾰχῠ́ς (takhús), fast, quickly	tachycardia, tachypnea
-tension, -tensive	pressure	Latin tēnsiō, stretching, extension, tension	hypertension
terato-	Monster	Greek τέρᾰς (téras)	teratoma, teratogen
tetan-	rigid, tense	Greek τέτανος (tétanos)	tetanus
thec-	case, sheath	Greek θήκη (thḗkē)	intrathecal
thel-	of or pertaining to a nipple (uncommon as a prefix)	Greek θηλή (thēlḗ), a teat, nipple	Theleplasty, thelarche
thely-	denoting something as relating to a woman, feminine	Greek θῆλῠς (thêlus), female, feminine	Thelygenous
therap-	treatment	Greek θερᾰπείᾱ (therapeíā)	hydrotherapy, therapeutic
therm(o)-	heat	Greek θερμός (thermós)	hypothermia, thermoregulation
thorac(i)-, thorac(o)-, thoracico-	of or pertaining to the upper chest, chest(thorax); the area above the breast and under the neck	Latin thōrāx < Greek θώρᾱξ (thṓrāx), chest, cuirass	thoracic spine
thromb(o)-	of or relating to a blood clot, clotting of blood	Greek θρόμβος (thrómbos), lump, piece, clot of blood	thrombus, thrombocytopenia
thyr(o)-	thyroid	Greek θῠρεός (thureós), large oblong shield; + εἶδος (eîdos), a form or shape	
thym-	emotions	Greek θῡμός (thūmós), spirit, soul; courage; breath, mind, emotions	dysthymia
-tic	pertaining to	Greek -τῐκός (-tikós), adjective-forming suffix denoting: relating to, able to, suited to	
-tide	bound to, forming a noun from an adjective by dropping -ic and adding -tide.	Greek - πεπτός (- peptós), adjective-forming suffix denoting: bound to, relating to, able to, suited to	Glycopeptide Nucleotide Peptide
toco-	childbirth	Greek τόκος (tókos)	tocolytic, dystocia
-tome	cutting instrument	Greek τομή (tomḗ), intersection	osteotome
-tomy	act of cutting; incising, incision	Greek τομία (-tomía)	Gastrotomy, Phlebotomy
ton-	tone, tension, pressure	Greek τόνος (tónos), rope, cord; tension	Tonicity, Isotonic saline
-tony	tension	Greek -τονία (-tonía)	Hypotonia
top(o)-	place, topical	Greek τόπος (tópos)	Topical anesthetic
tort(i)-	twisted	Latin tortus	Torticollis, Testicular torsion
tox(i)-, tox(o)-, toxic(o)-	toxin, poison	Greek τοξικόν (toxikón), bow (archery), bow-related; from Greek τοξικόν φάρμᾰκον (toxikón phármakon), poison for smearing arrows with	Toxoplasmosis, Toxidrome
trache(a)-	trachea	Greek τραχεῖα (trakheîa), windpipe	Tracheotomy
trachel(o)-	of or pertaining to the neck	Greek τρᾰ́χηλος (trákhēlos), neck	Tracheloplasty
trans-	denoting something as moving or situated across or through	Latin trāns, across, through	Transfusion
tri-	three	Latin tri-	Triceps, Trisomy
trich(i)-, -trichia, trich(o)-	of or pertaining to hair, hair-like structure	Greek θρῐ́ξ (thríx), hair	Trichocyst
-tripsy	crushing	Greek τρῖψις (trípsis), rubbing, friction	Lithotripsy
-trophy	nourishment, development	Greek τροφή (trophḗ), food, nourishment	Pseudohypertrophy
-trop	turned toward, with an orientation toward, having an affinity for, affecting	Greek τρόπος (trópos), a turn, way, manner, style	Geotropic, Phototropic
tympan(o)-	eardrum	Greek τῠ́μπᾰνον (túmpanon), drum, eardrum	Tympanocentesis, Tensor tympani

=== U ===
Affix	Meaning	Origin language and etymology	Example(s)
-ula, -ule	small	Latin	Nodule
ultra-	beyond, excessive	Latin ultra	ultrasound, ultraviolet
umbilic-	of or pertaining to the navel, the umbilicus	Latin umbilīcus, navel, belly-button	umbilical
ungui-	of or pertaining to the nail, a claw	Latin unguis, nail, claw	unguiform, ungual
un(i)-	one	Latin ūnus	unilateral hearing loss
ur-	of or pertaining to urine, the urinary system	Greek οὐρέω, οὐρεῖν (ouréō, oureîn); οὖρον (oûron), urine	antidiuretic, diuresis, diuretic, dysuria, enuresis, polyurea, polyuria, uraemia/uremia, uremic, ureter, urethra, urology
urin-	of or pertaining to urine, the urinary system	Latin ūrīna, urine < Greek οὖρον (oûron), see ur- above.	uriniferous
uter(o)-	of or pertaining to the uterus or womb	Latin uterus, womb, uterus	uterus

=== V ===
Affix	Meaning	Origin language and etymology	Example(s)
vagin-	of or pertaining to the vagina	Latin vāgīna, sheath, scabbard; vagina	vaginal epithelium
varic(o)-	swollen or twisted vein	Latin varix	varicose, esophageal varices
vas(o)-	duct, blood vessel	Latin vās, vessel, dish, vase	vasoconstriction
vasculo-	blood vessel	Latin vāsculum	cardiovascular
ven-	of or pertaining to the veins, venous blood, and the vascular system	Latin vēna, blood-vessel, vein	venule, venospasm
ventr(o)-	of or pertaining to the belly, the stomach cavities	Latin venter, belly, stomach, womb	ventrodorsal
ventricul(o)-	of or pertaining to the ventricles; any hollow region inside an organ	Latin ventriculus, the ventricles of the heart, the ventricles of the brain	cardiac ventriculography, atrioventricular node
-version	turning	Latin versiō	anteversion, retroversion
vesic(o)-	of or pertaining to the bladder	Latin vēsīca, bladder, blister	vesical arteries
viscer(o)-	of or pertaining to the internal organs, the viscera	Latin viscus (pl. viscera), internal organ(s)	viscera

=== X–Z ===
Affix	Meaning	Origin language and etymology	Example(s)
xanth(o)-	having a yellow color, especially an abnormally yellow color	Greek ξᾰνθός (xanthós), yellow	xanthopathy xanthelasma
xen(o)-	foreign, different	Greek ξένος (xénos), foreign, stranger	xenograft
xer(o)-	dry, desert-like	Greek ξηρός (xērós), dry	xerostomia, xeroderma
xiph-	sword	Greek ξῐ́φος (xíphos), sword	xiphisternum, xiphoid, xiphoidalgia
-y	condition or process of	Latin -ia, from Greek -ῐ́ᾱ, -ειᾰ (-íā, -eia), suffixes used to form abstract nouns	surgery
ze-	boil	Greek ζέω (zéō), to boil, seethe, bubble	eczema
zo(o)-	animal, animal life	Greek ζῷον (zôion)	zoology
zym(o)-	fermentation	Greek ζύμη (zúmē), leaven, yeast	enzyme, lysozyme

== English meanings ==
This section contains lists of different root classification (e.g. body components, quantity, description, etc.). Each list is alphabetized by English meanings, with the corresponding Greek and Latin roots given.

=== Roots of the body ===
==== Roots of bodily concepts ====
Bodily concept	Greek root in English	Latin root in English	Other root in English
digestion	-pepsia	–	–
disease	-pathy	–	–
eating	-phagia	-vory	–

==== Body parts and substances ====
Body part or component	Greek root in English	Latin root in English	Other root in English
abdomen	lapar-	abdomin-	–
aorta	aort-	–	–
arm	brachi-	arm-	–
armpit	maschal-	axill-	–
artery	arteri-	–	–
back	not-	dors-	–
big toe	–	allic-, hallic-	–
bladder	cyst-	vesic-	–
blood	haem(at)- (Br. English); hem(at)- (Am. English)	sangui-, sanguin-	–
blood clot	thromb-	–	–
blood vessel	angi-	vas-, vascul-	–
body	soma-, somat-	corpor-	–
bone	oste-	ossi-	–
bone marrow, marrow	myel-	medull-	–
brain	encephal-	cerebr-	–
breast	mast-	mamm-	–
chest	steth-	pector-	–
cheek	parei-	bucc-	–
ear	ot(o)-	aur(i)-	–
eggs, ova	oo-	ov-	–
eye	ophthalm(o)-	ocul(o)-	optic(o)- (French)
eyelid	blephar(o)-	cili-, palpebr-	–
face	prosop(o)-	faci(o)-	–
fallopian tubes	salping(o)-	–	–
fat, fatty tissue	lip(o)-	adip-	–
finger	dactyl(o)-	digit-	–
forehead	–	front(o)-	–
gallbladder	cholecyst(o)-	fell-	–
genitals, sexually undifferentiated	gon(o)-, phall(o)-	–	–
gland	aden(o)-	–	–
glans penis or clitoridis	balan(o)-	–	–
gums	–	gingiv-	–
hair	trich(o)-	capill-	–
hands	cheir(o)-, chir(o)-	manu-	–
head	cephal(o)-	capit(o)-	–
heart	cardi(o)-	cordi-	–
hip, hip-joint	–	cox-	–
horn	cerat(o)-	cornu-	–
intestine	enter(o)-	–	–
jaw	gnath(o)-	–	–
kidney	nephr(o)-	ren-	–
knee	gon-	genu-	–
lip	cheil(o)-, chil(o)-	labi(o)-	–
liver	hepat(o)-	jecor-	–
loins, pubic region	episi(o)-	pudend-	–
lungs	pneumon-	pulmon(i)-, (pulmo-)	–
marrow, bone marrow	myel(o)-	medull-	–
mind	psych-	ment-	–
mouth	stomat(o)-	or-	–
muscle	my(o)-	–	–
nail	onych(o)-	ungui-	–
navel	omphal(o)-	umbilic-	–
neck	trachel(o)-	cervic-	–
nerve; the nervous system	neur(o)-	nerv-	–
nipple, teat	thele-	papill-, mammill-	–
nose	rhin(o)-	nas-	–
ovary	oophor(o)-	ovari(o)-	–
pelvis	pyel(o)-	pelv(i)-	–
penis	pe(o)-	–	–
pupil (of the eye)	cor-, core-, coro-	–	–
rib	pleur(o)-	cost(o)-	–
rib cage	thorac(i)-, thorac(o)-	–	–
shoulder	om(o)-	humer(o)-	–
sinus	–	sinus-	–
skin	derm-, dermat(o)-	cut-, cuticul-	–
skull	crani(o)-	–	–
stomach	gastr(o)-	ventr(o)-	–
testis	orchi(o)-, orchid(o)-	–	–
throat (upper throat cavity)	pharyng(o)-	–	–
throat (lower throat cavity/voice box)	laryng(o)-	–	–
thumb	–	pollic-	–
tooth	odont(o)-	dent(i)-	–
tongue	gloss-, glott-	lingu(a)-	–
toe	dactyl(o)-	digit-	–
tumour	cel-, onc(o)-	tum-	–
ureter	ureter(o)-	ureter(o)-	–
urethra	urethr(o)-, urethr(a)-	urethr(o)-, urethr(a)-	–
urine, urinary system	ur(o)-	urin(o)-	–
uterine tubes	salping(o)-	salping(o)-	–
uterus	hyster(o)-, metr(o)-	uter(o)-	–
vagina	colp(o)-	vagin-	–
vein	phleb(o)-	ven-	–
vulva	episi(o)-	vulv-	–
womb	hyster(o)-, metr(o)-	uter(o)-	–
wrist	carp(o)-	carp(o)-	–

=== Roots of color ===
Color	Greek root in English	Latin root in English	Other root in English
black	melan-	atr-, nigr-	–
blue	cyan-	cerule-	–
gold	chrys-	aur-	–
gray, grey	poli-	can-	–
green	chlor-	vir-	–
purple	porphyr-	purpur-, purpureo-	–
red	erythr-, rhod-	rub-, rubr-, ruf-	–
red-orange	cirrh-	–	–
silver	–	argent-	–
white	leuc-, leuk-	alb-, cand-	–
yellow	xanth-	flav-	jaun- (French)

=== Roots of description ===
Description	Greek root in English	Latin root in English	Other root in English
bad, incorrect	cac-, dys-	mal-	mis-
bent, crooked	ankyl-	prav-	–
big	mega-, megal(o)-	magn(i)-	–
biggest	megist-	maxim-	–
broad, wide	eury-	lat(i)-	–
cold	cry(o)-	frig(i)-	–
dead	necr(o)-	mort-	–
equal	is(o)-	equ(i)-	–
false	pseud(o)-	fals(i)-	–
fast	tachy-	celer-	–
female, feminine	thely-	–	–
flat	platy-	plan(i)-	–
good, well	eu-	ben(e)-, bon(i)-	–
great	mega-, megal(o)-	magn(i)-	–
hard	scler(o)-	dur(i)-	–
heavy	bar(o)-	grav(i)-	–
hollow	coel(o)-	cav(i)-	–
huge	megal(o)-	magn(i)-	–
irregular	poikil(o)	–	–
large; extremely large	mega-	magn(i)-	–
largest	megist-	maxim-	–
long	macr(o)-	long(i)-	–
male, masculine	arseno-	vir-	–
narrow	sten(o)-	angust(i)-	–
new	ne(o)-	nov(i)-	–
normal, correct	orth(o)-	rect(i)-	–
old	paleo-	veter-	–
sharp	oxy-	ac-	–
short	brachy-	brev(i)-	–
small	micr(o)-	parv(i)- (rare)	–
smallest	–	minim-	–
slow	brady-	tard(i)-	–
soft	malac(o)-	moll(i)-	–
straight	orth(o)-	rect(i)-	–
thick	pachy-	crass(i)-	–
varied, various	poikilo-	vari-	–

=== Roots of position ===
Description	Greek root in English	Latin root in English	Other root in English
around, surrounding	peri-	circum-	–
internal, within	endo-	intra-	–
left	levo-	laev-, sinistr-	–
middle	meso-, mes-	medi-	–
right	dexi-	dex-, dextr-, dextro-	–

=== Prefixes of quantity or amount ===
Description	Greek root in English	Latin root in English	Other root in English
double	diplo-	dupli-	–
equal	iso-	equi-	–
few	oligo-	pauci-	–
half	hemi-	semi-	demi- (French)
many, much	poly-	multi-	–
twice	dis-	bis-	–

== See also ==
- Glossary of medicine
- Classical compound
- International scientific vocabulary
- List of medical abbreviations
- Medical dictionary
- Medicine
- List of commonly used taxonomic affixes
