= List of medical abbreviations: F =

Sortable table
Abbreviation	Meaning
F_{x}	fracture
FA	Fanconi anemia
FAMMM syndrome	familial atypical multiple mole melanoma syndrome
FANA	fluorescent antinuclear antibody test
FAP	familial adenomatous polyposis
FAST	focused assessment with sonography for trauma
FB	foreign body
FBC	Family Birth Center
FBC	full blood count
FBE	full blood exam
FBG	fasting blood glucose
FBS	Failed back syndrome
FBS	fasting blood sugar
F/C	fevers and/or chills
F/C/S	fevers and/or chills and/or sweating
FCS	Faciocutaneoskeletal syndrome
FDC	follicular dendritic cells
FDC	fixed dose combination
FDG	fluordeoxyglucose
FDIU	fetal demise in utero
FDP	fibrin degradation product
FDP	Flexor digitorum profundus
FDS	Flexor digitorum superficialis
Fe	iron
FEF_{25–75}	forced expiratory flow at 25–75% of forced vital capacity
fem	female
fem	femoral
FEN	Fluids, Electrolytes, Nutrition
FEP	free erythrocyte protoporphyrin
FEP	fibroepithelial polyp
FESS	functional endoscopic sinus surgery
FET	frozen embryo transfer
FEV_{1}	forced expiratory volume in 1 second
FF	free fluids (non-thickened fluids)
FFA	free fatty acids
FFP	fresh frozen plasma
FGR	fetal growth restriction
FHR	fetal heart rate
FHS	fetal heart sound
FHT	fetal heart tones
FHx	family history (in medicine, meaning specifically the medical histories of family members and ancestors)
FIBD	found in bed dead
FISH	fluorescence in situ hybridization
FL	femur length
FLAIR	fluid-attenuated inversion recovery
FLK	funny-looking kid (slang reference to dysmorphic features)
fl.oz.	fluid ounce (1 Imperial fluid ounce ≈ 28.4 mL; 1 U.S. fluid ounce ≈ 29.6 mL) (use of these units is generally deprecated in modern medicine in favor of mL)
FM	fetal movement
FMF	fetal movements felt
FMP	first menstrual period (that is, menarche)
FMPP	Familial male precocious puberty
fMRI	functional magnetic resonance imaging
FMS	Fibromyalgia Syndrome
F→N	finger-to-nose test (one simple clinical test of motor coordination)
FNA	fine-needle aspiration
FNAB	fine-needle aspiration biopsy
FNAC	fine-needle aspiration cytology
FNC	full nursing care
FND	Functional neurologic disorder
FNH	focal nodular hyperplasia
FOB	Foot of Bed, father of baby, Fiberoptic Bronchoscopy
FOBT	fecal occult blood test
FOF	found on floor (patient fell out of bed)
FOP	Fibrousdysplasia ossificans progressiva
FOS	full of stool
FOOSH	fall on outstretched hand
FP	Family Planning
FPG	fasting plasma glucose
FRDA	Friedreich's ataxia
FROM	full range of motion
FSBS	finger-stick blood sugar (one method of blood glucose monitoring)
FSE	fetal scalp electrode
FSGS	focal segmental glomerulosclerosis
FSH	follicle-stimulating hormone
FSIQ	full scale intelligence quotient (Wechsler Intelligence Scale for Children)
FTA	fluorescent treponemal antibody (see syphilis)
FTA-ABS	fluorescent treponemal antibody absorption (see syphilis)
FtM	Female to Male transgender person (Trans Man)
FTT	failure to thrive
F/U	follow-up
FUE	Follicular Unit Extraction
FUPA	Fatty Upper Pelvic Region
FUT	Follicular Unit Transplantation
FUO	fever of unknown origin
FVC	forced vital capacity (spirometry test value used in assessment of chronic obstructive pulmonary disease)
FWB	full weight bearing
FWB	fetal wellbeing
FWD	full ward diet
FWD	forward
Fx	fracture
Fx	fraction
fxn	function
