= Nephroptosis =

Sinking of the kidney into the pelvis

- Other names: Floating kidney or Renal ptosis
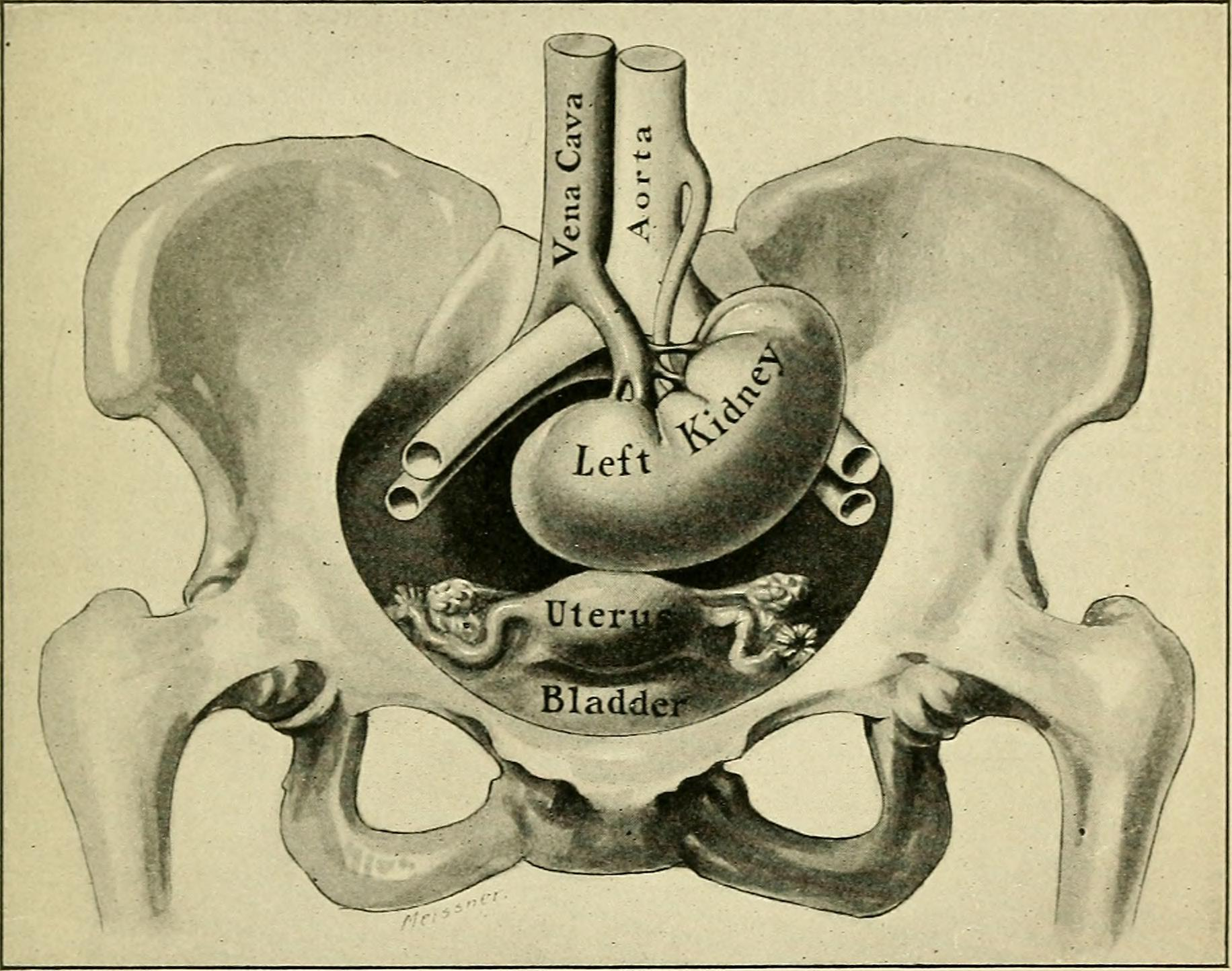
- Ectopic kidney
- Specialty: Urology, nephrology
- Symptoms: asymptomatic in most; may have violent attacks of colicky flank pain, vomiting, nausea, tachycardia, chills, hypertension, hematuria and proteinuria

Nephroptosis (from Ancient Greek νεφρός (nephrós), meaning "kidney", and πτῶσις (ptôsis), meaning “falling, fall”), is a rare and abnormal condition in which the kidney drops down into the pelvis when the patient stands up. It is more common in women than in men. It has been one of the most controversial conditions in terms of both its diagnosis and its treatments.

== Symptoms and signs ==
Nephroptosis is asymptomatic in most people. However, nephroptosis can be characterized by violent attacks of flank pain (renal colic), nausea, chills, hypertension, hematuria and proteinuria. Those with symptomatic nephroptosis often complain of sharp pains that radiate into the groin. Many patients also suggest a weighing feeling on the abdomen. Pain is typically relieved by lying down. It is believed that this is because, as standing up causes the kidney to drop down, the organ "kinks off" urinary tract drainage, causing an obstruction, and movement of the kidney upon lying down relieves this pressure. The attack of colic pain is called 'Dietl's crisis' or 'renal paroxysm'.

Due to the rarity of the condition and its relatively vague symptoms, patients are often initially misdiagnosed. Many doctors are either unfamiliar with the condition or skeptical that the condition exists at all.

== Cause ==
It is believed to result from deficiency of supporting inferior pararenal fasciae.

== Diagnosis ==
Diagnosis is contemplated based upon patient symptoms. Diagnosis is confirmed during intravenous urography, by obtaining erect and supine films. The renal DMSA scan may show decreased counts in the sitting position compared with supine scan.

== Treatment ==
Nephropexy (a surgical repositioning of the kidney) is sometimes performed to stabilize the kidney in selected symptomatic patients. However, the surgery does not guarantee the symptoms will go away. Nephropexy is not recommended in asymptomatic patients.
