= Aphallia =

Failure of the penis or clitoris to develop during embryonic growth

- Other names: Penile agenesis

Aphallia is a congenital malformation in which the phallus (penis or clitoris) is absent. It is also known as penile agenesis in the case of males. The word is derived from Ancient Greek a- 'not' and phallos 'penis'. It is classified as a disorder of sex development.

== Causes ==
Aphallia has no known cause. It is not linked to deficient hormone amounts or action, but rather to a failure of the fetal genital tubercle to form between 3 and 6 weeks after conception. The urethra of an affected child opens on the perineum.

== Diagnosis ==
Aphallia is usually diagnosed at birth by observation of the genital area, which is usually ambiguous.

== Treatment ==
Congenital anomalies like cryptorchidism, renal agenesis/dysplasia, musculoskeletal and cardiopulmonary anomalies are also common (>50% cases), hence evaluation of the patient for internal anomalies is mandatory. Although aphallia can occur in any body type, it is considered a substantially more troublesome problem with those who have testes present, and has in the past sometimes been considered justification for assigning and rearing a male infant as a girl, after the outdated 1950s theory that gender as a social construct was purely nurture and so an individual child could be raised early on and into one gender or the other. Many advocacy groups have advocate harshly against coercive genital reassignment however, and encourage infants' genitals to be left intact. The nurture theory has been largely abandoned and cases of trying to rear children this way have not proven to be successful transitions. Consensus recommends male gender assignment.

Recent advances in surgical phalloplasty techniques have provided additional options for those still interested in pursuing surgery.

== Incidence ==
Aphallia or absence of the penis is a very rare congenital anomaly with an estimated incidence of 1 in 10,000,000 births. It is a rare condition, with only approximately 60 cases reported as of 1989, and 75 cases as of 2005. However, due to the stigma of the condition and the issues of keeping accurate statistics and records among doctors, it is likely there are more cases than reported. In females, clitoral absence is almost common since clitoral erection is not felt, but most may still pass urine normally.

== See also ==
- Perineal urethra, where the urethra fails to develop normally
- Anorchia, where the testicles fail to develop
