= Omphalotomy =

Medical procedure

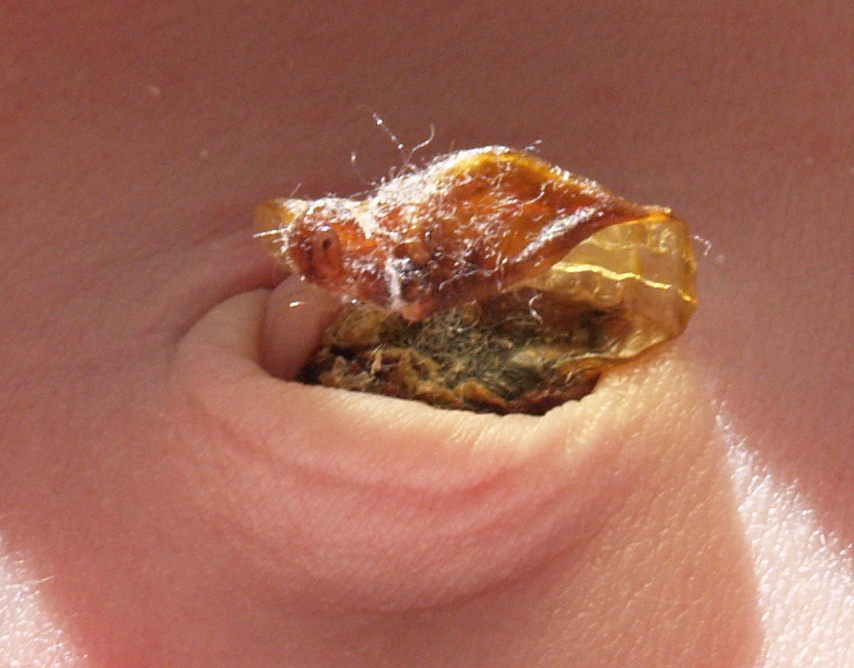
The Umbilical cord stump, left behind after omphalotomy

Omphalotomy is the medical procedure that involves the cutting of the umbilical cord after childbirth. The word omphalotomy is derived from the prefix omphal(o)-, from the Ancient Greek word ὀμφαλός (omphalós), meaning navel, and the suffix -tomy, also from Ancient Greek, meaning incision. The incision is normally made between two clamps on the umbilical cord, used to stop blood flow, leaving an umbilical stump attached to the baby. After roughly 15 days, the remaining umbilical stump dries out and falls off, leaving a scar: the navel, or belly-button
