= Primordial phallus =

Organ in embryology

Phallus
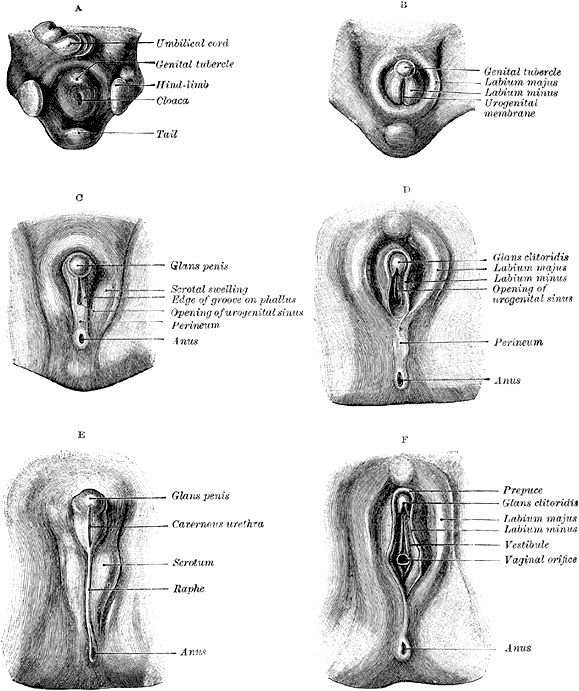
- Stages in the development of the external sexual organs in the male and female.

Details

Identifiers
- Latin: phallus primordialis
- TE: phallus_by_E5.7.4.0.1.0.2 E5.7.4.0.1.0.2

In embryology, the primordial phallus refers to the clitoris of a female, or the penis in the male, during embryonic development of the urinary and reproductive organs, before sexual differentiation is evident. This is also the case for the immature male analog, the immature glans penis.

The external genital form after the 12th week of pregnancy, influenced by the levels of estrogen and testosterone. If the primordial phallus develops into a clitoris, this happens during the first trimester.

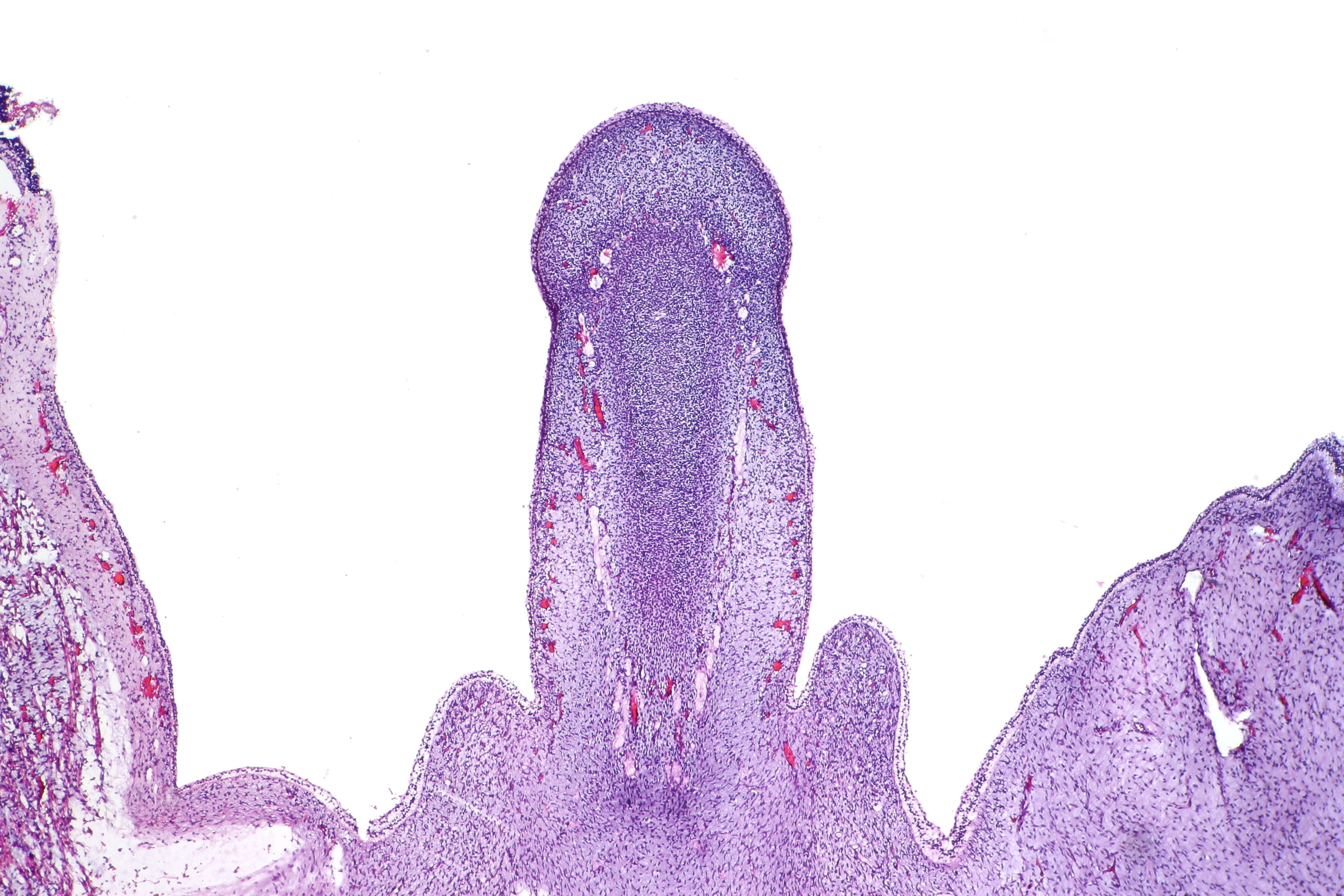
Micrograph of the primordial phallus, H&E stain.

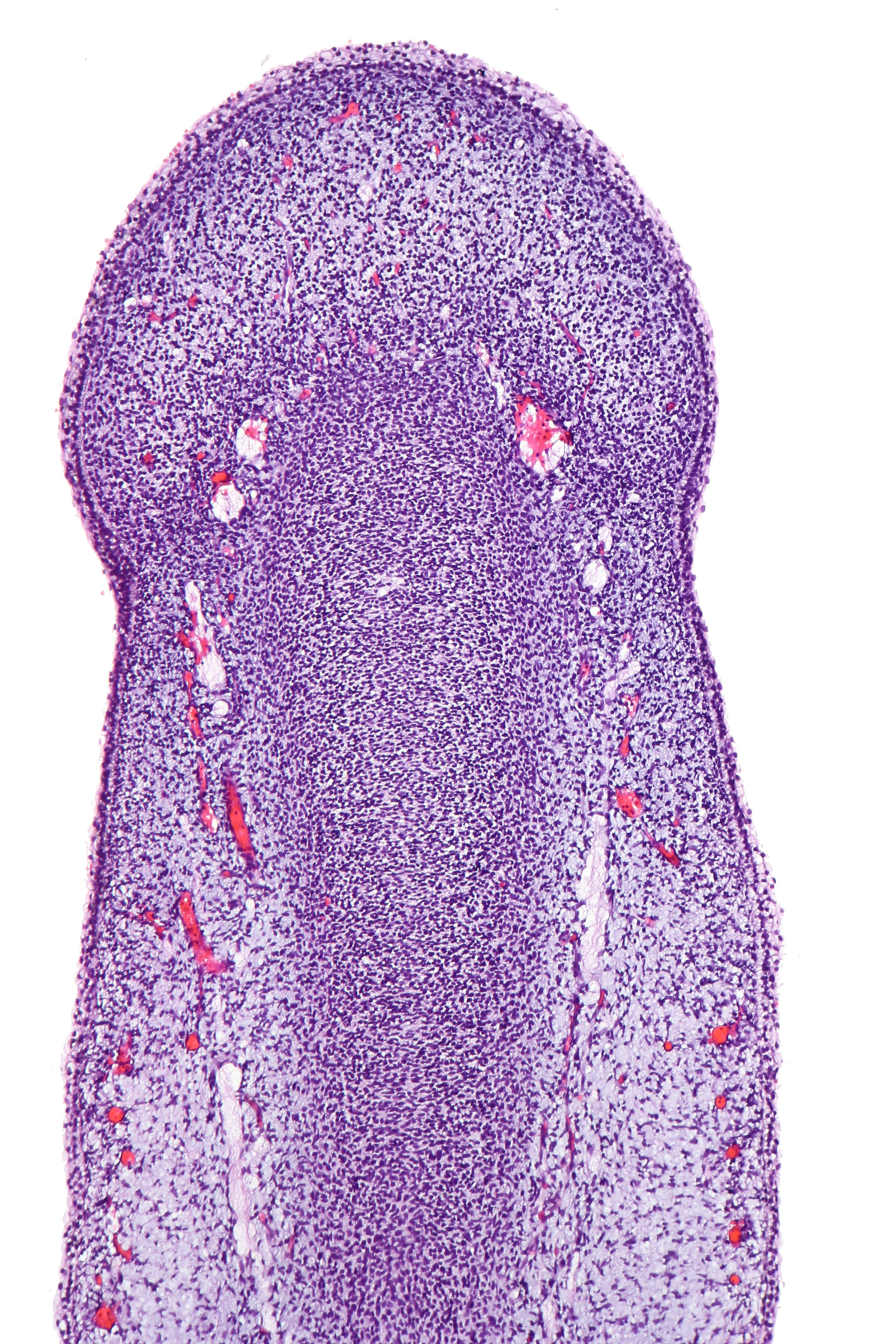
Micrograph of the primordial phallus, H&E stain.

== See also ==
- Aphallia
- Genital tubercle
