= Venospasm =

Contraction of a vein as protection

Venospasm is the contraction of a vein as a protective mechanism. It may follow infusion of a cold or irritating substance into the vein. If a vein spasms while an intravenous catheter such as PICC line is being removed, the catheter can become torn and require retrieval by interventional radiology.
