= Nephropexy =

- ICD-9-CM: 55.7
- OPS-301 code: 5-559.2
- Other codes: CPT code range 50400-50405

Nephropexy is the surgical intervention aiming to reposition and fixate a floating or mobile kidney. This is done in order to prevent its descent (nephroptosis) or to deliberately move the kidney downward in order to compensate for a shortened ureter. While the procedure originally followed an open approach, minimally invasive laparoscopic nephropexies are standard nowadays.

It was first performed by Eugen Hahn on 10 April 1881.
