= Ventricle =

Ventricle may refer to:

- Ventricle (heart), the pumping chambers of the heart
- Ventricular system in the brain
- Ventricle of the larynx, a structure in the larynx
