= Femoral =

Femoral may refer to:

- Having to do with the femur
- Femoral artery
- Femoral intercourse
- Femoral nerve
- Femoral triangle
- Femoral vein
- Insect femur
