= XXXYY syndrome =

Chromosomal disorder

- Other names: 49,XXXYY
- Karyotype of XXXYY syndrome
- Specialty: Medical genetics
- Symptoms: Intellectual disability, facial dysmorphisms, genital anomalies
- Usual onset: Conception
- Duration: Lifelong
- Causes: Nondisjunction
- Diagnostic method: Karyotype

XXXYY syndrome, also known as 49,XXXYY, is a chromosomal disorder in which a male has three copies of the X chromosome and two copies of the Y chromosome. XXXYY syndrome is exceptionally rare, with only eight recorded cases. Little is known about its presentation, but associated characteristics include intellectual disability, anomalies of the external genitalia, and characteristic physical and facial features. It is not caused by characteristics of the parents, but rather occurs via nondisjunction, a random event in gamete development. The karyotype observed in the syndrome is formally known as 49,XXXYY, which represents the 49 chromosomes observed in the disorder as compared to the 46 in normal human development.

XXXYY syndrome was first recorded in 1963. Its long-term prognosis is poorly understood; while the condition as reported in the medical literature is relatively severe, it is unknown if there are milder cases that have not come to diagnostic attention.

== Presentation ==
Due to its exceptional rarity, little is known about XXXYY syndrome. There are no unbiased descriptions of the disorder; all living XXXYY males reported in the medical literature were diagnosed after birth due to symptoms, and it is unknown if there are milder cases that have not come to diagnostic attention. All known cases of the syndrome have been associated with developmental delay or intellectual disability. Adult XXXYY men have generally been reported as having moderate to severe intellectual disability; moderate intellectual disability is defined by an adult cognitive capacity similar to that of a six- to eight-year-old and the ability to acquire basic living and employment skills with support, while the severe form is associated with an adult capability similar to that of a three- to five-year-old, with long-term dependence on caregivers.

Sex chromosome aneuploidies (Note: Aneuploidy is the presence of too many or too few chromosomes in a cell.) are generally associated with tall stature, particularly polysomies of the Y chromosome, but data on tetrasomy and pentasomy disorders (Note: In the context of sex chromosome disorders specifically, tetrasomy refers to karyotypes with four sex chromosomes, and pentasomy to ones with five.) is less clear and some seem associated with short stature; adult XXXYY men in the medical literature have ranged in height from 170 centimetres (5 ft 7 in) to 192 centimetres (6 ft 4 in). The disorder seems associated with dysmorphic features (unusual facial features), with reported examples including hypertelorism (wide-spaced eyes), a prominent forehead and wide nasal bridge, epicanthic folds, and micrognathia (small chin). Other unusual features reported include clinodactyly (incurved pinky fingers) and radioulnar synostosis (fusion of the long bones in the forearm). These findings are common to sex chromosome aneuploidies. XXXYY syndrome is thought to be associated with similar congenital issues to other sex chromosome tetrasomy and pentasomy disorders, such as heart and kidney malformations, dental issues, and minor facial dysmorphology.

As very few cases of XXXYY syndrome in adult men have been reported, drawing conclusions about physical development and hormonal functioning is difficult. Only one XXXYY man recorded in the medical literature has undergone hormone testing. He was found to have low testosterone, alongside elevated lutenizing hormone and follicle stimulating hormone. According to literature reviews, genital abnormalities are a hallmark of the syndrome. Reported findings include micropenis and cryptorchidism (undescended testes). Adults generally have sparse or absent facial hair. Some men have been described as having high-pitched voices.

Little is understood about the psychological and behavioural phenotype of XXXYY syndrome. One review described behaviour as "generally passive", a common description of people with X-chromosome polysomy. The literature is divided on whether autism or autistic features are common, though they have been reported in other X- and Y-chromosome disorders. Behavioural "outbursts" are mentioned by two reviews. X- and Y-chromosome polysomies are both associated with behavioural and psychological sequelae. Because XXXYY syndrome involves both X and Y polysomy, it is unclear what effects are caused by each.

== Causes ==
XXXYY syndrome is caused by two extra copies of the X chromosome alongside one extra copy of the Y chromosome, producing a total complement of 49 chromosomes rather than the usual 46. Sex chromosome aneuploidies are the most frequent form of aneuploidy in humans. Though a 48-chromosome complement involving the autosomes would be unsurvivable, 49,XXXYY and other high-level sex chromosome aneuploidies, such as tetrasomy X, pentasomy X, XYYY syndrome, XYYYY syndrome, and XXXXY syndrome, are survivable with relatively mild phenotypes due to the paucity of genes vital to basic development on the sex chromosomes.

Sex chromosome aneuploidies are caused by nondisjunction, a process through which gametes (eggs or sperm) with too many or too few chromosomes are produced. In nondisjunction, homologous chromosomes or sister chromatids fail to separate properly when producing gametes. XXXYY syndrome, by its nature, requires multiple steps of nondisjunction. Possible causes include fertilization of a normal egg by an XXYY sperm, fertilization of an XX egg by an XYY sperm, or fertilization of an XXX egg by a YY sperm. Nondisjunction is generally a random event not related to any characteristic of the parents, and almost never recurs in their future children.

== Diagnosis ==
Chromosome aneuploidies such as XXXYY syndrome are diagnosed through the process of karyotyping, or chromosome testing. One recorded case of the disorder was diagnosed prenatally via amniocentesis, but did not survive to birth; all other reported cases of XXXYY syndrome were diagnosed postnatally. Sex chromosome aneuploidies can only be diagnosed via conclusive genetic testing, not on the basis of clinical examination, due to their nonspecific phenotypes. Such disorders are underdiagnosed, and when diagnosis does occur, it is often late.

== Prognosis ==
The long-term prognosis of XXXYY syndrome is little-understood. Few adults with the disorder have been reported, and there are no reports of people diagnosed prenatally who survived to birth. This lack of prognosis information is common in sex chromosome tetrasomy and pentasomy; though longitudinal studies exist for the sex chromosome trisomies, higher-level aneuploidies are far rarer and information more sparse. Good prognosis appears linked to strong parental and personal support; people with such disorders whose caregivers have acted as advocates for their success have been reported as achieving at higher personal and social levels than the general portrait in the medical literature.

== Epidemiology ==
XXXYY syndrome is exceptionally rare. Only eight cases of the condition have been reported in the medical literature, and the prevalence is estimated to be below 1 in 1000000. Sex chromosome tetrasomy and pentasomy disorders are thought to be underdiagnosed, and people may exist who have milder versions of such conditions than are generally reported. XXXYY syndrome only occurs in males, as the Y chromosome is in most cases necessary for male sexual development; this is not changed by the presence of multiple X chromosomes.

== History ==
XXXYY syndrome was first recorded in 1963, in a 26-year-old man with a moderate intellectual disability living at the Utah State Training School who was ascertained due to having physical traits of Klinefelter syndrome. By that time, three men with XXYY syndrome had been reported. 49,XXXYY was one of the later sex chromosome aneuploidies to be discovered, being preceded by Turner, Klinefelter, and trisomy X in 1959, XXYY syndrome in 1960, and XYY and tetrasomy X in 1961. The 49,XXXYY karyotype was not reported again until 1974, highlighting the rarity of the syndrome. By the time of Linden, Bender, and Robinson's seminal review of sex chromosome tetrasomy and pentasomy in 1995, five cases of XXXYY syndrome had been reported. As of 2023, three cases of XXXYY syndrome have been diagnosed in the 21st century.

Early research on sex chromosome aneuploidies suffered from ascertainment bias. Patients were screened in prisons and institutions, forming an image of such conditions as severely disabling. This was particularly marked for Y-chromosome polysomy; early research into men with extra Y chromosomes focused on criminality, depicting such men as inclined to violent and unlawful behaviour. These assumptions were later disproven by longitudinal studies of people diagnosed at birth with sex chromosome trisomies, which found people with 47,XXY, 47,XXX, and 47,XYY karyotypes blended into the general population and had little unusual propensity for criminality. Despite these advances regarding sex chromosome trisomies, the tetrasomy and pentasomy variants remain understudied. Due to their extreme rarity, none were detected in these cohort studies, and no unbiased information exists on their long-term prognosis.
