= XXYYY syndrome =

Human chromosomal condition

XXYYY Syndrome
- Specialty: Medical genetics
- Diagnostic method: Karyotype

49,XXYYY syndrome is an intersex variation in which a person has two extra Y chromosomes and one extra X chromosome. It is a rare condition, although its exact prevalence is unknown. This medical condition has been recorded since the 1960s. People with this genetic variation tend to present with facial dysmorphism, mild microcephaly, limited supination at the elbows, delayed bone age, and moderate intellectual disability. This variation is often considered a subset of Klinefelter syndrome. If these symptoms cause physical difficulties, they may be classified as a physical disability.

Medical professionals analyzed tissue samples taken for chromosomal studies from ambiguous external genitalia and abdominal gonads, consisting of a left ovotestis and a right primitive testis, and found that they contained cells with sex chromosomes 46,XX, 47,XXY, and 49,XXYYY. This implies that those with ambiguous genitalia or ovotesticular tissue may, in some cases, have the genetic material to generate, raise, or develop a child with 49,XXYYY syndrome, if they are able to ovulate and/or produce sperm.

49,XXYYY syndrome, as a rare sex chromosomal aneuploidy (SCA), is often studied together with 45,X, known as Turner syndrome, XYY syndrome (known as Superman or Jacobs syndrome), 47,XXX (known as trisomy X), 48,XYYY, 48,XXYY, mosaicism 46,XY/47,XYY, 48,XXYY, 49,XXXYY, 48,XXXX (known as tetrasomy X), and 49,XXXXX (known as pentasomy X). These medical conditions are considered intersex variations.
