= XYYY syndrome =

Chromosomal disorder

- Other names: 48,XYYY
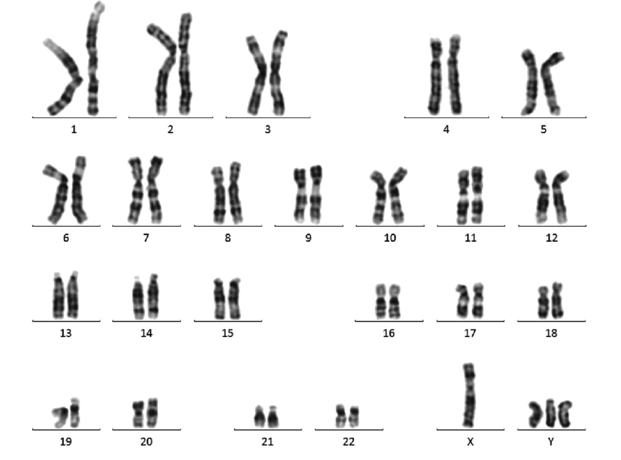
- Karyotype of XYYY syndrome
- Specialty: Medical genetics
- Symptoms: Infertility, behavioural issues, developmental delays
- Usual onset: Conception
- Duration: Lifelong
- Causes: Aneuploidy
- Diagnostic method: Karyotype

XYYY syndrome, also known as 48,XYYY, is a chromosomal disorder in which a male has two extra copies of the Y chromosome. The syndrome is exceptionally rare, with only twelve recorded cases. The presentation of the syndrome is heterogeneous, but appears to be more severe than its counterpart XYY syndrome. Common traits include borderline to mild intellectual disability, infertility, radioulnar synostosis (the fusion of the long bones in the forearm), and in some cases tall stature.

== Presentation ==
The presentation of XYYY syndrome is variable and at this time not entirely clear. As all known cases were diagnosed postnatally (after birth), and the similar XYY syndrome is known to have a milder phenotype in prenatally than postnatally diagnosed cases, it is suspected that many cases of XYYY syndrome may be mild or asymptomatic.

The intellectual abilities of known XYYY cases have varied, especially in cases with mosaicism, but in most cases are in the borderline intellectual functioning range (IQ between 70–85). Performance IQ is often higher than verbal IQ. Mild speech delays have been reported. Basic self-care skills, such as toileting, dressing, eating, and hygiene, are normal or at most slightly delayed. A number of minor skeletal anomalies are observed, such as clinodactyly, radioulnar synostosis (the fusion of the long bones in the forearm), and poor dental development. These findings are also observed in other sex chromosome aneuploidies. Height is normal to tall, with some cases of abnormally tall stature. Aside from severe acne in adolescence, XYYY syndrome is not associated with any obvious physical or facial abnormalities.

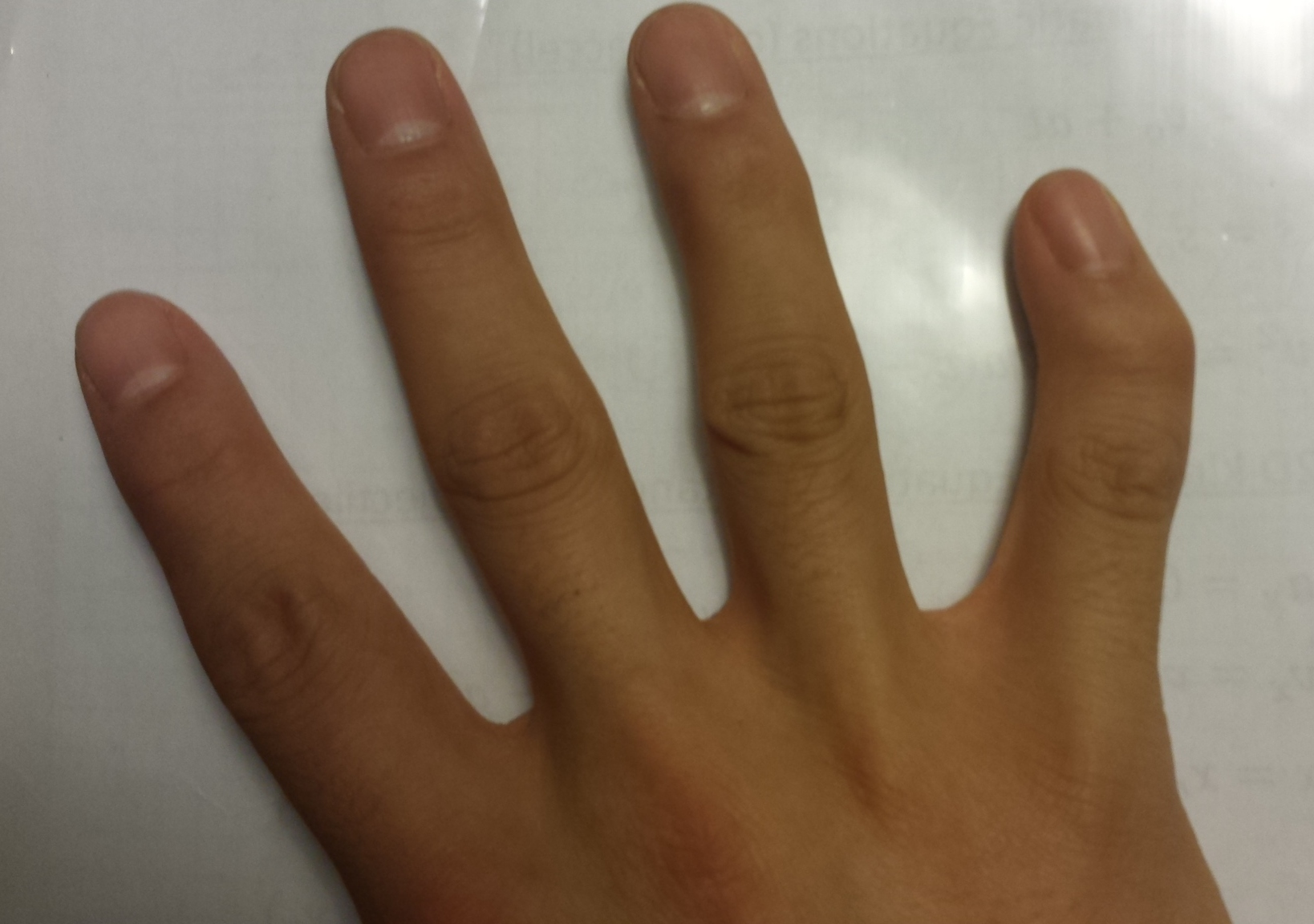
Clinodactyly of the right hand

As very few cases of XYYY syndrome in adult men have been reported, drawing certain conclusions about sexual functioning and reproduction is difficult. However, low testosterone appears to be associated. All adult men with a non-mosaic 48,XYYY karyotype known to the medical literature have been azoospermic, though one man reported with a 46,XY/48,XYYY mosaic complement (81.1% 48,XYYY) had some evidence of spermatogenesis. Some adults have had impulsive or aggressive sexual behaviour, while some have had low sex drives and no apparent sexual interest; one had gender dysphoria. Two men with XYYY syndrome are known to have had independent adult lives, marrying and finding employment, and only came to medical attention for infertility.

Behavioural issues, varying in severity, are associated with the syndrome. Some patients have been transferred to special schools, high-security group homes, or institutions due to severe aggression. However, those cases with particularly severe behavioural issues have generally been from problematic or abusive familial backgrounds. While some descriptions of the syndrome emphasize aggression as a characteristic, the majority of parent reports from a leading chromosome disorder charity emphasize insecurity, immaturity, and shyness. Though teenage boys with XYYY syndrome may be at-risk adolescents, they are capable of positive identity formation, and case reports following the identity formation and personal development of XYYY adolescents have demonstrated a desire to have healthy relationships and integrate successfully into society.

== Causes ==
XYYY syndrome is caused by two extra copies of the Y chromosome, the chromosome that determines male sexual development. Sex chromosome aneuploidies are the most frequent form of aneuploidy in humans. Though a 48-chromosome complement involving the autosomes would be unsurvivable, 48,XYYY and other high-level sex chromosome aneuploidies such as XXXY syndrome and tetrasomy X—or indeed 49-chromosome disorders such as pentasomy X—are survivable with relatively mild phenotypes due to the paucity of genes vital to basic development on the sex chromosomes.

Sex chromosome aneuploidies occur via a process known as non-disjunction, where chromosomes fail to divide properly during cell division and produce gametes, in this case sperm, with an abnormal number of chromosomes. In the case of XYYY syndrome, the karyotype may be a result of non-disjunction with an XYY father, or of double non-disjunction resulting in a YYY sperm with a chromosomally normal father. Non-disjunction can also arise during embryo development shortly after conception, which often gives rise to mosaicism.

== Diagnosis ==
Chromosome aneuploidies such as 48,XYYY are diagnosed via karyotype. Rarely, XYYY syndrome has been detected prenatally via amniocentesis, though no prenatally diagnosed cases of XYYY syndrome have survived to birth.

== Epidemiology ==
XYYY syndrome is exceptionally rare. Only twelve cases have been reported in the medical literature, in addition to four mosaic cases. As the related XYY syndrome is much more common and has a mild to asymptomatic phenotype, it is speculated that there may be many undiagnosed cases of XYYY syndrome that are milder than those medically reported.

== History ==
XYYY syndrome was first recorded in 1965, when the 48,XYYY karyotype was found in a five-year-old boy evaluated for borderline intellectual disability. Another case of non-mosaic 48,XYYY would not be reported until 1972, highlighting the rarity of the syndrome. As karyotyping at the time was in its infancy, confirming many early cases was difficult; one early recorded case of a supposed 47,XYY/48,XYYY mosaic was found after further investigation to have an unrelated chromosomal rearrangement.

Early research into men with Y-chromosome polysomy was focused on the possibility for violent and criminal behaviour. Cases would be screened for in prisons and mental hospitals, creating a cycle of confirmation for the hypothesis that men with additional Y chromosomes were criminals by only searching for them in criminal populations. These assumptions would later be disproven by longitudinal studies of people diagnosed at birth with sex chromosome aneuploidies, which discovered that men with one additional Y chromosome had no particular criminal propensities and were barely distinguishable from the general population. However, as the only conditions to be found in such population surveys were Klinefelter's syndrome, trisomy X, and XYY syndrome, rarer conditions such as XYYY syndrome remain little-understood.

== Comparison with XYY syndrome ==
The much better-understood XYY syndrome occurs in approximately 1 in 1,000 males. XYY syndrome is known to have a milder phenotype in cases found by chance, such as during prenatal screening, than in those karyotyped due to a medical or behavioural indication. As all described cases of XYYY syndrome were ascertained due to a medical indication, it is unclear whether the relatively severe phenotype described in the medical literature is representative of all XYYY cases, or if there are milder cases that have not been brought to diagnostic attention.

The two syndromes have a number of symptoms in common, such as tall stature (although the height increase in XYY appears greater than that in XYYY) and behavioural issues. One significant observed distinction is that while males with 47,XYY karyotypes usually have normal fertility, 48,XYYY appears associated with infertility or sterility. The 47,XYY karyotype is associated with an increased expression of H-Y antigen, and the azoospermia observed in 48,XYYY subjects may in turn be associated with a higher expression of H-Y antigen than in 47,XYY.
