= Synostosis =

Fusion of two or more bones

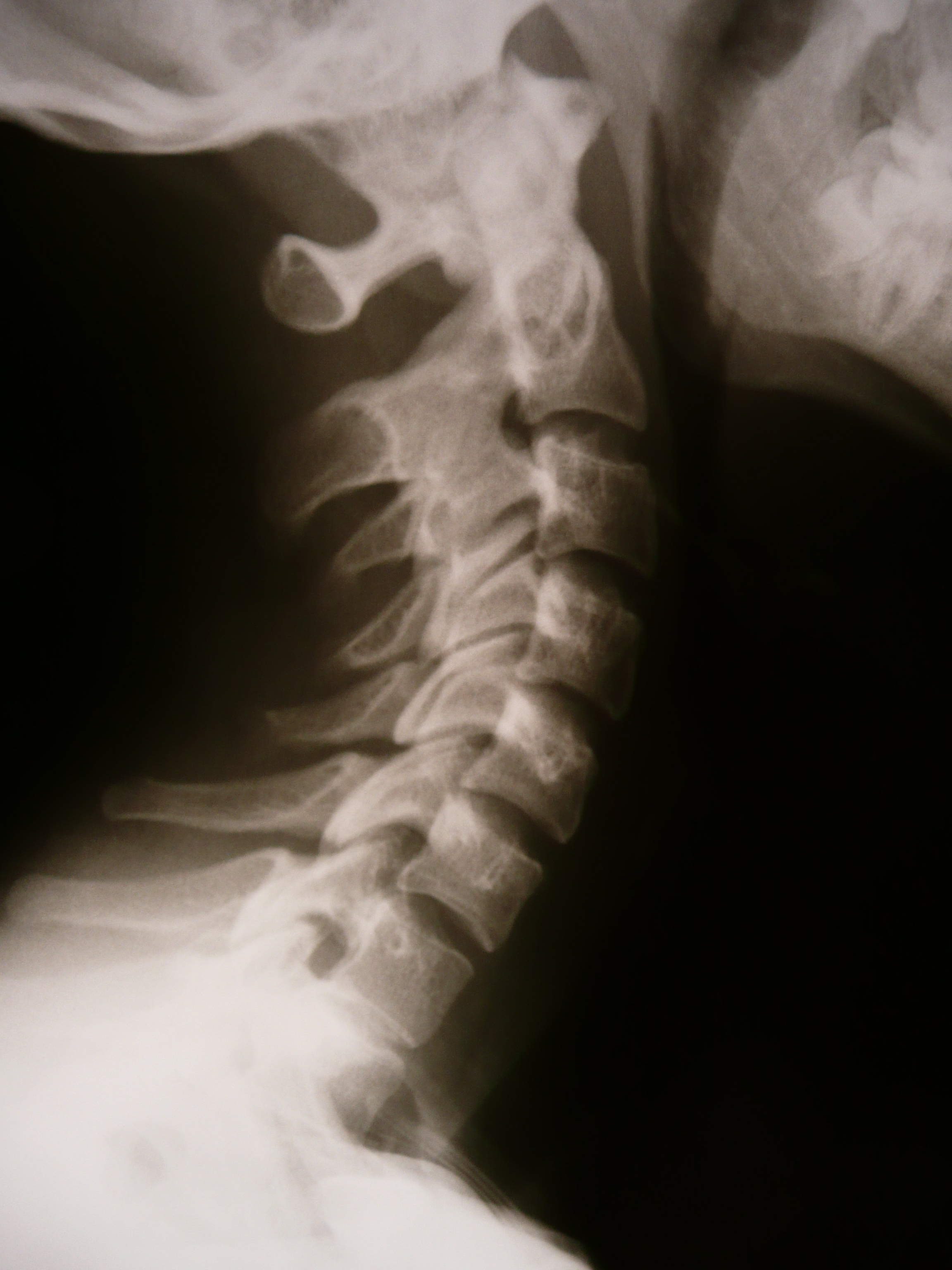
- X-ray showing synostosis in the cervical spine

Identifiers
- MeSH: D013580
- TA98: A03.0.00.019
- TA2: 1532
- FMA: 7499

Synostosis (from Ancient Greek συν- (syn-) 'together' and ὀστέον (ostéon) 'bone'; plural: synostoses) is fusion of two or more bones. It can be normal in puberty (e.g. fusion of the epiphyseal plate to become the epiphyseal line), or abnormal. When synostosis is abnormal it is a type of dysostosis. Examples of synostoses include:

- craniosynostosis – an abnormal fusion of two or more cranial bones;
- radioulnar synostosis – the abnormal fusion of the radius and ulna bones of the forearm;
- tarsal coalition – a failure to separately form all seven bones of the tarsus (the hind part of the foot) resulting in an amalgamation of two bones; and
- syndactyly – the abnormal fusion of neighboring digits.

Synostosis within joints can cause ankylosis.

== Clinical significance ==
Radioulnar synostosis is one of the more common failures of separation of parts of the upper limb. There are two general types: one is characterized by fusion of the radius and ulna at their proximal borders and the other is fused distal to the proximal radial epiphysis. Most cases are sporadic, congenital (due to a defect in longitudinal segmentation at the 7th week of development) and less often post-traumatic, bilateral in 60%, and more common in males. Familial cases in association with autosomal dominant transmission appear to be concentrated in certain geographic regions, such as Sicily.

The condition frequently is not noted until late childhood, as function may be normal, especially in unilateral cases. Increased wrist motion may compensate for the absent forearm motion. It has been suggested that individuals whose forearms are fixed in greater amounts of pronation (over 60 degrees) face more problems with function than those with around 20 degrees of fixation. Pain is generally not a problem, unless radial head dislocation should occur.

Most examples of radioulnar synostosis are isolated (non-syndromic). Syndromes that may be accompanied by radioulnar synostosis include X chromosome polyploidy (e.g., XXXY) and other chromosome disorders (e.g., 4p- syndrome, Williams syndrome), acrofacial dysostosis, Antley–Bixler syndrome, genitopatellar syndrome, Greig cephalopolysyndactyly syndrome, hereditary multiple osteochondromas (hereditary multiple exostoses), limb-body wall complex, and Nievergelt syndrome. Craniosynostosis (from cranio, cranium; + syn, together; + ostosis relating to bone) is a condition in which one or more of the fibrous sutures in an infant skull prematurely fuses by turning into bone (ossification). Craniosynostosis has following kinds: scaphocephaly, trigonocephaly, plagiocephaly, anterior plagiocephaly, posterior plagiocephaly, brachycephaly, oxycephaly, pansynostosis.
