= Pentasomy X =

Chromosomal disorder

- Other names: 49,XXXXX
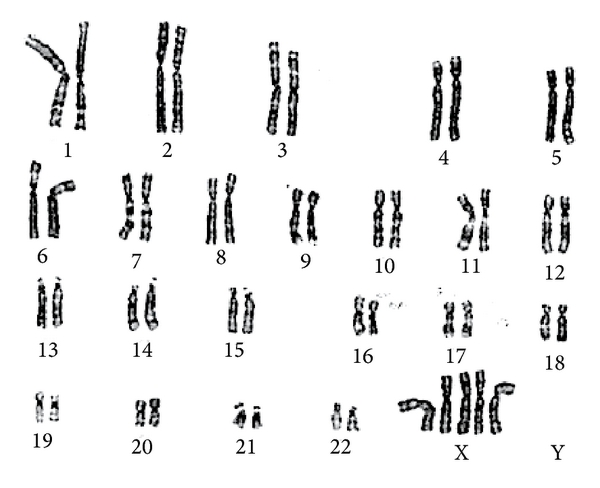
- Karyotype of pentasomy X
- Specialty: Medical genetics
- Symptoms: Intellectual disability, facial dysmorphisms, heart defects
- Usual onset: Conception
- Duration: Lifelong
- Causes: Nondisjunction
- Diagnostic method: Karyotype

Pentasomy X, also known as 49,XXXXX, is a chromosomal disorder in which a female has five, rather than two, copies of the X chromosome. Pentasomy X is associated with short stature, intellectual disability, characteristic facial features, heart defects, skeletal anomalies, and pubertal and reproductive abnormalities. The condition is exceptionally rare, with an estimated prevalence between 1 in 85,000 and 1 in 250,000.

The condition has a large variety of symptoms, and it is difficult to paint a conclusive portrait of its phenotypes. Though significant disability is characteristic, there are so few diagnosed cases that confident conclusions about the presentation and prognosis remain impossible. Pentasomy X may be mistaken for more common chromosomal disorders, such as Down syndrome or Turner syndrome, before a conclusive diagnosis is reached.

Pentasomy X is not inherited but rather occurs via nondisjunction, a random event in gamete development. The karyotype observed in pentasomy X is formally known as 49,XXXXX, which represents the 49 chromosomes observed in the disorder as compared to the 46 in typical human development.

== Presentation ==
The major clinical features of pentasomy X are intellectual disability, short stature, facial and musculoskeletal abnormalities, and congenital heart defects. Although one recorded case has been of low average intelligence, all other known cases have been intellectually disabled, with an average IQ of 50. The overall portrait is one of moderate intellectual disability, defined by an adult cognitive capacity similar to that of a six- to eight-year-old and the ability to acquire basic living and employment skills with support. Some girls with pentasomy X attend special education in mainstream schools through mainstreaming or inclusion, while some attend special schools.

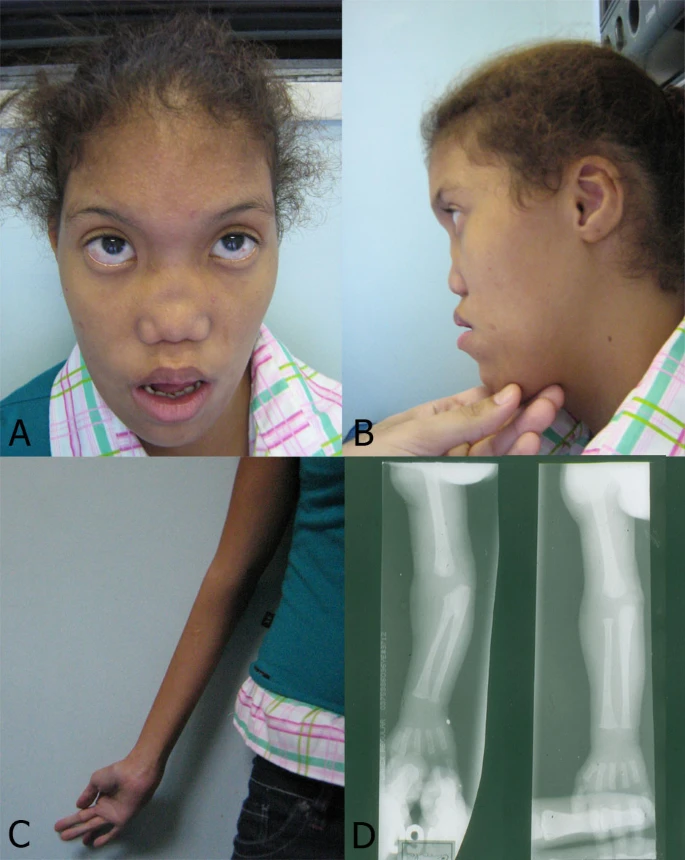
A 15-year-old girl with pentasomy X, demonstrating facial, limb, and skeletal features

Pentasomy X is associated with a number of physical anomalies, including short stature, clinodactyly (incurved pinky fingers), and distinctive facial features. Common findings include microcephaly, low-set ears, hypertelorism (wide-spaced eyes), and epicanthic folds. The characteristic facies have been described as "coarse", much like those of the related disorder tetrasomy X. Pentasomy X is unique amongst X-chromosome polysomies for its association with short stature, when most related disorders are associated with tall stature; the average height in pentasomy X is one standard deviation below the norm. Hypotonia, often severe, is a frequent finding, as are related musculoskeletal issues such as hip dysplasia. The severity of repeated joint dislocations may lead to a differential diagnosis of Larsen syndrome, as suggested in one reported case. Bone maturation may be delayed. Another skeletal finding is taurodontism, where the pulp of the teeth is enlarged into the roots; other dental abnormalities, such as missing teeth and severe tooth decay, have also been reported. These findings are not specific to pentasomy X, but rather common to sex chromosome aneuploidies in general and in particular show a strong resemblance to the male counterpart 49,XXXXY. Epicanthic folds and hypertelorism are also observed in tetrasomy and trisomy X, while clinodactyly and radioulnar synostosis are seen in all sex chromosome aneuploidies and taurodontism is specifically common to X-chromosome polysomies.

Heart defects are associated with the syndrome. Pentasomy X has one of the highest rates of congenital heart defects of any chromosomal disorder, with 56.5% of recorded patients having a heart defect of some kind. Patent ductus arteriosus is particularly frequent. The majority of such conditions resolve without surgical treatment, although a minority require it. Ventricular septal defects are also frequent. Other internal medical issues frequently recorded include kidney and urinary defects. Epilepsy has been associated with the condition, though seems to be rare. In sex chromosome aneuploidies as a whole, epilepsy is usually mild and amenable to treatment, and reports of epilepsy in pentasomy X have described it resolving with treatment and allowing antiepileptic drugs to eventually be stopped.

Puberty is altered in pentasomy X, although as few adults with the condition have been reported, the full scope of such alterations is unclear. In the sister condition of tetrasomy X, half of all women undergo puberty normally, while half have no or incomplete puberty. Some adolescents and adults with pentasomy X have been prepubertal, while some have had premature ovarian failure (early menopause) and some have had apparently non-noteworthy pubertal development. Though external genitalia is generally normal, underlying gonadal dysfunction is frequent, including ovarian dysfunction or an unusually small uterus. No cases are known of women with pentasomy X having children, but although fertility is likely reduced, some may be able to.

Little is understood about the psychological and behavioural phenotype of pentasomy X. Girls and women with the disorder are frequently described as shy and cooperative. Such traits are common to other conditions involving extra copies of the X chromosome. Developmental delays can cause difficulty communicating, resulting in frustration and tantrums. Overall, the syndrome is not associated with severe behavioural issues.

A number of disorders have been reported as comorbid with sex chromosome aneuploidies, including pentasomy X. In one case report, pentasomy X occurred alongside the similarly rare hyperimmunoglobulin E syndrome. Other possibly coincidental associations have included cerebral palsy and Dandy–Walker malformation.

== Causes ==
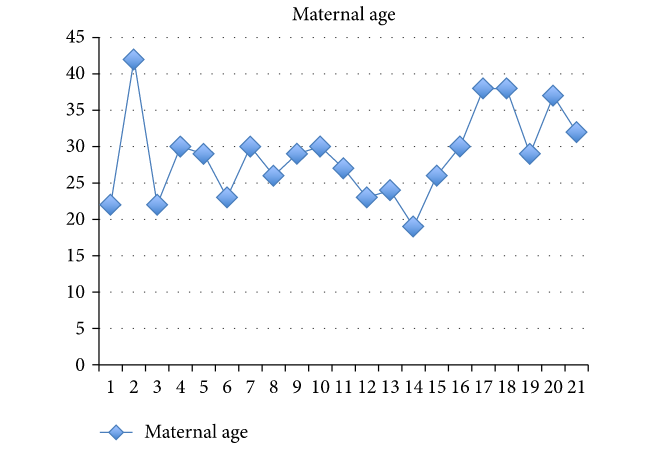
Maternal age in 21 cases of pentasomy X, showing the unclear relationship

Pentasomy X is caused by nondisjunction, a process through which gametes (eggs or sperm) with too many or too few chromosomes are produced. In nondisjunction, homologous chromosomes or sister chromatids fail to separate properly when producing gametes. In sex chromosome tetrasomy and pentasomy, the extra chromosomes are consistently inherited from one parent. In the specific case of pentasomy X, all known cases have inherited the additional chromosomes from the mother. This has been suggested to relate to genomic imprinting; specifically, it is hypothesized that specific loci on the sex chromosomes are affected by imprinting such that only maternal overimprinting is survivable, and cases of pentasomy X where the additional chromosomes were inherited from the father would be incompatible with life. As well as during gamete development, nondisjunction can occur after conception, resulting in a mosaic karyotype.

Nondisjunction is related to advanced maternal age, although due to its rarity, the maternal age effect in pentasomy X is unclear. More common aneuploidy syndromes, such as Down syndrome and Klinefelter's syndrome, have strong relationships with maternal age. Pentasomy X is not inherited and is not caused by the actions of the parents. However, in rare cases, pentasomy X may be related to chromosomal mosaicism in a parent.

X inactivation is a major factor in pentasomy X. X inactivation is the process through which genes in second (or higher) copies of the X chromosome are turned off, such that any cell has only one active copy of the chromosome. However, X inactivation appears to be disrupted in pentasomy X, allowing up to half of the supposedly inactive genetic material to be expressed. This is assumed to contribute to the severe phenotype of the condition compared to other sex chromosome aneuploidies.

== Diagnosis ==
Chromosome aneuploidies such as pentasomy X are diagnosed through the process of karyotyping, or chromosome testing. Diagnosis cannot be made on the basis of phenotype alone, as multiple other conditions present similarly.

The phenotype of pentasomy X is not specific to the disorder, and many other conditions can be differential diagnoses. One is tetrasomy X, a related disorder in which a girl or woman has four copies of the X chromosome. The general profiles of the conditions are similar, with developmental delays, mild dysmorphic features, and shared congenital anomalies such as clinodactyly and radioulnar synostosis. However, the phenotype of pentasomy X is more severe than that of tetrasomy X, with lower IQ and more severe dysmorphism. Pentasomy X also has additional characteristics uncommon in the tetrasomy, such as short stature. Mosaic karyotypes, with both 48,XXXX and 49,XXXXX cells, are also possible. Though very few mosaic cases have been reported, the phenotype appears intermediate in severity between tetrasomy and pentasomy X.

Another potential differential diagnosis is Down syndrome. The features of the two conditions overlap, and some girls with pentasomy X may be assumed to have Down's before genetic ascertainment. Some cases of pentasomy X have had family histories of Down syndrome, inciting speculation that the conditions may tend to recur in the same family lines; alternatively, it may suggest that some patients diagnosed with Down syndrome on the basis of phenotype may actually have pentasomy X.

The phenotype of pentasomy X has also been compared to that of Turner syndrome, characterized by a female having one copy of the X chromosome. Both Turner's and pentasomy X are female-only disorders characterized by short stature, heart defects, and abnormal pubertal development. However, the intellectual disabilities observed in pentasomy X are rare in Turner syndrome.

== Prognosis ==
The long-term prognosis of pentasomy X is unclear, due to its low prevalence. Though some reviews claim a poor prognosis due to the congenital defects observed in severe cases, support groups report milder abnormalities than common in the medical literature, including adults with pentasomy X in fair health. The spectrum of severity varies; long-term support is consistent, though some women have been reported as being able to work part-time and manage some of their affairs. For sex chromosome tetrasomy and pentasomy disorders as a whole, good prognosis is linked to strong parental and personal support. Girls and women with pentasomy X whose caregivers have acted as advocates for their success have been reported as achieving at higher personal and social levels than the general portrait of the medical literature.

== Epidemiology ==
Pentasomy X is exceptionally rare. The disorder is estimated to occur in approximately 1 in 250,000 females. Some higher estimates posit the condition may be as frequent as 1 in 85,000, as observed in the related 49,XXXXY syndrome. Fewer than thirty cases of the disorder have been reported in the medical literature, although it is speculated that many more cases have gone undiagnosed. Pentasomy X only occurs in females, as the Y chromosome is in most cases necessary for male sexual development.

== History ==
Pentasomy X was first diagnosed in 1963, in a two-year-old girl karyotyped for severe intellectual disability. At the time, four cases of XXXXY syndrome had already been recorded. Pentasomy X was one of the later sex chromosome aneuploidies to be discovered, being preceded by Turner, Klinefelter, and trisomy X in 1959, XXYY syndrome in 1960, and XYY and tetrasomy X in 1961. By the time of Linden, Bender, and Robinson's seminal review of sex chromosome tetrasomy and pentasomy in 1995, only 25 cases had been recorded, the eldest in a girl of 16. As late as 2011, reviews claimed no adult women with pentasomy X had been ascertained, though chromosomal disorder organization Unique noted in 2005 its oldest member with pentasomy X was 29 years old.

== See also ==
- Sex chromosome anomalies
- Trisomy X
- Skewed X-inactivation
