= Shirley Ratcliffe =

British doctor and researcher

Shirley Geraldine Ratcliffe
- Born: Shirley Geraldine Elphinstone-Roe; September 1932; Kenya
- Died: 17 July 2013 (aged 80); United Kingdom
- Education: Royal College of Physicians of London
- Occupations: Physician, pediatrician, medical researcher
- Known for: Longitudinal study of infants with sex chromosome disorders; XYY and XXY research
- Children: 2
- Scientific career
- Fields: Pediatrics, human genetics, sex chromosome disorders
- Workplaces: Royal Hospital for Sick Children, Edinburgh; Medical Research Council (MRC), Edinburgh; Great Ormond Street Hospital Institute of Child Health

Shirley Geraldine Ratcliffe (September 1932 – 17 July 2013) was a British doctor and researcher into sex chromosome disorders.

== Early life and education ==
Shirley Geraldine Elphinstone-Roe was born in Kenya in September 1932. Her parents moved the family to England when she was five, and she was orphaned five years later when both her parents died in the Second World War. She was adopted along with her sister by an aunt in Edenbridge, Kent. When she was 16, she nursed her aunt while her aunt died of cancer.

She studied at the Royal College of Physicians of London, receiving her license to practice in 1956 under the name Shirley Ratcliffe, as she had married.

== Career ==
Shortly after graduation she moved to Edinburgh to join her husband, who was in art school there at the time.

Starting as a specialist trainee paediatrician at Edinburgh's Royal Hospital for Sick Children, she joined the UK's Medical Research Council in 1971 as a clinical scientist and honorary consultant paediatrician. In 1967 the MRC in Edinburgh launched a longitudinal study of infants, in order to determine the prevalence of sex chromosome disorders and to track outcomes of people born with them; the study was launched due to sensational publications claiming that XYY males were doomed to become aggressive and criminal adults. Ratcliffe was part of the study from the beginning and continued with it until it ended in the mid-1990s; it became the focus of her career. In 1987, she moved to Great Ormond Street Hospital's Institute of Child Health due to the expertise of its staff in growth analysis. A summary of the study's findings published in 1999. Her work provided the foundation of contemporary medical understanding of abnormal chromosomes.

== Personal life ==
Ratcliffe and her husband had two children; she and her husband divorced in 1974. She was active in the Medical Campaign Against Nuclear Weapons movement in the 1980s.

She was diagnosed with Parkinson's disease in 2000, and came out of retirement to serve as a director of the Parkinson's Disease Society Of the United Kingdom from 2005 to 2009. She died 17 July 2013.

== Selected works ==
- Ratcliffe, SG (September 1981). "The effect of chromosome abnormalities on human growth". British Medical Bulletin. 37 (3): 291–5. doi:10.1093/oxfordjournals.bmb.a071717. PMID 6459813.
- Bancroft, J; Axworthy, D; Ratcliffe, S (April 1982). "The personality and psycho-sexual development of boys with 47 XXY chromosome constitution". Journal of Child Psychology and Psychiatry, and Allied Disciplines. 23 (2): 169–80. doi:10.1111/j.1469-7610.1982.tb00061.x. PMID 7068790.
- Ratcliffe, SG; Field, MA (October 1982). "Emotional disorder in XYY children: four case reports". Journal of Child Psychology and Psychiatry, and Allied Disciplines. 23 (4): 401–6. doi:10.1111/j.1469-7610.1982.tb00086.x. PMID 7130298.
- Tierney, I; Smith, L; Axworthy, D; Ratcliffe, SG (February 1984). "The McCarthy Scales of Children's Abilities--sex and handedness effects in 128 Scottish five-year-olds". The British Journal of Educational Psychology. 54 (1): 101–5. doi:10.1111/j.2044-8279.1984.tb00849.x. PMID 6704317.
- Ratcliffe, Shirley G.; Paul, Natalie, eds. (1986). Prospective studies on children with sex chromosome aneuploidy [2nd print.] Birth defects original article series. Vol. 22. New York: Liss. pp. 1–328. ISBN 978-0-8451-1062-1. PMID 3814774.
- May, KM; Jacobs, PA; Lee, M; Ratcliffe, S; Robinson, A; Nielsen, J; Hassold, TJ (April 1990). "The parental origin of the extra X chromosome in 47,XXX females". American Journal of Human Genetics. 46 (4): 754–61. PMC 1683670. PMID 2316522.
- Ratcliffe, S (February 1999). "Long-term outcome in children of sex chromosome abnormalities". Archives of Disease in Childhood. 80 (2): 192–5. doi:10.1136/adc.80.2.192. PMC 1717826. PMID 10325742.
