= OSLAM syndrome =

- Other names: Osteosarcoma-limb anomalies-erythroid macrocytosis syndrome
- OSLAM syndrome is inherited in an autosomal dominant manner

OSLAM syndrome is a rare autosomal dominant hereditary disorder. Its name is an initialism of "osteosarcoma, limb anomalies, and erythroid macrocytosis with megaloblastic marrow syndrome". OSLAM syndrome was recognised and described by Mulvilhill et al. as a syndrome that increases susceptibility to tumours and is characterised by an impaired regulation of bone and marrow development.

Individuals with OSLAM syndrome have an elevated risk of bone cancer, limb abnormalities, and enlarged red blood cells.

== Signs and symptoms ==
Clinical presentation is consistent with:

- Bone cancer
- Curved fifth fingers (clinodactyly) with brachymesophalangy (shortened phalanges of the toes and/or fingers (digits))
- Absence of one digital ray of the foot (a digit and corresponding metacarpal or metatarsal bone)
- Bilateral radioulnar synostosis
- Enlarged red blood cells
- Dental decay
- Short stature

== See also ==
- Li-Fraumeni syndrome
