= Dysostosis =

Bone developmental disorders affecting ossification

- Specialty: Medical genetics

A dysostosis (from Ancient Greek δῠσ- (dys-) 'bad, difficult' and ὀστέον (ostéon) 'bone') is a disorder of the development of bone, in particular affecting ossification. Examples include craniofacial dysostosis, Klippel–Feil syndrome, and Rubinstein–Taybi syndrome.

It is one of the two categories of constitutional disorders of bone (the other being osteochondrodysplasia). When the disorder involves the joint between two bones, the term synostosis is often used.
