= XXXXY syndrome =

Chromosomal anomaly

- Other names: Fraccaro syndrome 49,XXXXY syndrome
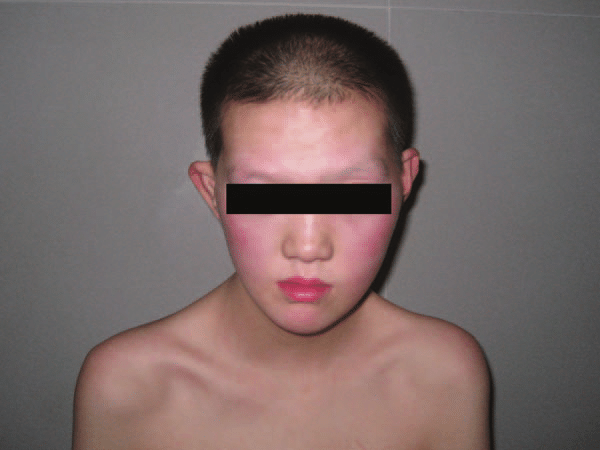
- A 19-year-old man with XXXXY syndrome and prognathism
- Specialty: Medical genetics
- Usual onset: Prenatal
- Duration: Lifelong
- Causes: Cellular nondisjunction during meiosis
- Diagnostic method: Karyotype
- Frequency: 1 in 85,000 to 100,000

XXXXY syndrome, also known as 49,XXXXY syndrome or Fraccaro syndrome, is an extremely rare aneuploidic sex chromosomal abnormality. It occurs in approximately 1 out of 85,000 to 100,000 males. This syndrome is the result of maternal non-disjunction during both meiosis I and II. It was first diagnosed in 1960 and was named Fraccaro syndrome after the researcher.

== Signs and symptoms ==
The symptoms of 49,XXXXY are slightly similar to those of Klinefelter syndrome and 48,XXXY, but they are usually much more severe. Aneuploidy is often fatal, although the effect of the additional gene dosage is greatly reduced due to lyonization, leaving 3 Barr bodies.

=== Reproductive ===
Those with 49,XXXXY syndrome tend to exhibit infantile secondary sex characteristics with sterility in adulthood.

- Hypoplastic genitalia
- Absent or delayed puberty

=== Physical ===
Males with 49,XXXXY tend to have numerous skeletal anomalies. These skeletal anomalies include:

- Genu valgum
- Pes cavus
- Fifth finger clinodactyly

The effects also include:

- Cleft palate
- Club feet
- Respiratory conditions
- Short or/and broad neck
- Low birth weight
- Hyperextensible joints
- Short stature
- Narrow shoulders
- Coarse features in older age
- Hypertelorism
- Epicanthal folds
- Prognathism
- Gynecomastia (rare)
- Muscular hypotonia
- Cryptorchidism
- Congenital heart defects
- A very round face in infancy

49,XXXXY may also be associated with increased rates of primary immunodeficiency.

=== Cognitive and developmental ===
Much like Down syndrome, the mental effects of 49,XXXXY syndrome vary. Impaired speech and maladaptive behavioral problems are typical. One study looked at males that were diagnosed with 48,XXYY, 48,XXXY and 49,XXXXY. They found that males with 48,XXXY and 49,XXXXY function at a much lower cognitive level than males their age. These males also tend to exhibit more immature behavior for their chronological age; increased aggressive tendencies were also cited in this study.

A 2020 study found that boys with 49,XXXXY have heightened rates of internalizing behavior and anxiety, beginning as early as preschool. Tests using the Social Responsiveness Scale-2 (SRS-2) found that while those with the condition generally showed more signs of social impairment, there was minimal effect on their social awareness.

== Pathophysiology ==
As its name indicates, a person with the syndrome has one Y chromosome and four X chromosomes on the 23rd pair, thus having forty-nine chromosomes rather than the normal forty-six. As with most categories of aneuploidy disorders, 49,XXXXY syndrome is often accompanied by intellectual disability. It can be considered a form or variant of Klinefelter syndrome (47,XXY). Individuals with this syndrome are typically mosaic, being 49,XXXXY/48, XXXX.

It is genetic but not hereditary, meaning that while the genes of the parents cause the syndrome, there is a small chance of more than one child having the syndrome. The probability of inheriting the disease is about one percent.

== Diagnosis ==
49,XXXXY can be clinically diagnosed through karyotyping. Facial dysmorphia and other somatic abnormalities may be reason to have the genetic testing done.

== Treatment ==
While there is no treatment to correct the genetic abnormality of this syndrome, there is the potential to treat the symptoms. As a result of infertility, one man from Iran used artificial reproductive methods. An infant in Iran diagnosed with 49,XXXXY syndrome was born with patent ductus arteriosus, which was corrected with surgery, and other complications that were managed with replacement therapy.

The administration of testosterone therapy has been shown to improve motor skills, speech, and nonverbal IQ in males with 49,XXXXY.

== See also ==
- Sex chromosome anomalies
- Aneuploidy
- Turner syndrome
- Klinefelter syndrome
- 49, XXXXX, a similar syndrome that affects females
