= Sex chromosome anomalies =

Sex chromosome anomalies belong to a group of genetic conditions that are caused or affected by the loss, damage or addition of one or both sex chromosomes (also called gonosomes).

In humans this may refer to:

| Anomaly | Frequency |
|---|---|
| 45, Y | Not a viable organism, as the X chromosome contains genes that are fundamental to life. |
| 45, X, also known as Turner syndrome | 1 in 2,000-5,000 (female) |
| 45,X/46,XY mosaicism, also known as X0/XY mosaicism and mixed gonadal dysgenesis | 1 in 15,000 |
| 46, XX/XY | |
| 47, XXX, also known as trisomy X or triple X syndrome | 1 in 1,000 (female) |
| 47, XXY, also known as Klinefelter syndrome | 1 in 500-1,000 |
| 47, XYY, also known as Jacobs syndrome | 1 in 1,000 (male) |
| 48, XXXX, also known as tetrasomy X | 1 in 50,000 (female) |
| 48, XXXY | 1 in 50,000 |
| 48, XXYY | 1 in 18,000-40,000 (male) |
| 48, XYYY | 12 recorded cases (male) |
| 49, XXXXY | 1 in 85,000-100,000 (male) |
| 49, XYYYY | 7 recorded cases (male) |
| 49, XXXXX, also known as pentasomy X | 1 in 85,000-250,000 |
| 46, XX gonadal dysgenesis | |
| 46, XY gonadal dysgenesis, also known as Swyer syndrome | 1 in 100,000 |
| 46, XX male syndrome, also known as de la Chapelle syndrome | 1 in 20,000 |

In this list, the karyotype is summarized by the number of chromosomes, followed by the sex chromosomes present in each cell. (In the second and third cases the karyotype varies from cell to cell, while in the last three cases, the genotype is normal but the phenotype is not.)
