= Tetrasomy X =

Chromosomal disorder with 4 X chromosomes

- Other names: 48,XXXX
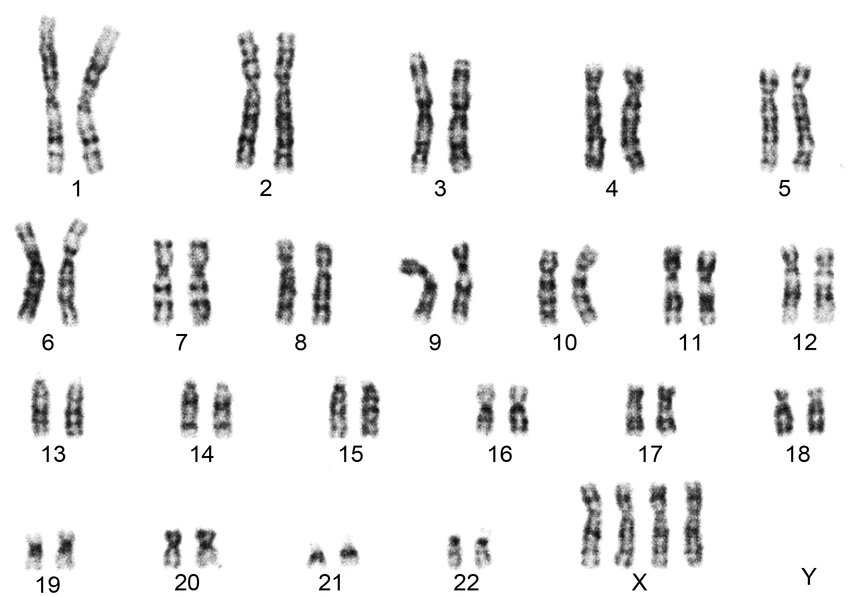
- Specialty: Medical genetics
- Symptoms: Intellectual disability, facial dysmorphology, heart defects, skeletal anomalies, tall stature
- Usual onset: Conception
- Duration: Lifelong
- Causes: Nondisjunction
- Diagnostic method: Karyotype
- Differential diagnosis: Trisomy X, pentasomy X, Down syndrome

Tetrasomy X, also known as 48,XXXX or Poly-X Klinefelter, is a chromosomal disorder in which a female has four, rather than two, copies of the X chromosome. It is associated with intellectual disability of varying severity, characteristic "coarse" facial features, heart defects, and skeletal anomalies such as increased height, clinodactyly (incurved pinky fingers), and radioulnar synostosis (fusion of the long bones in the forearm). Tetrasomy X is a rare condition, with few medically recognized cases; it is estimated to occur in approximately 1 in 50,000 females.

The disorder has a wide range of symptoms, with phenotypes (presentations) ranging from slight to severe. It is suspected to be underdiagnosed, as are other sex chromosome disorders. Life outcomes vary; some women have had education, employment, and children, while others have remained dependent into adulthood. Life expectancy does not appear to be substantially reduced. Tetrasomy X has phenotypic overlap with a number of more common disorders, such as trisomy X and Down syndrome, and diagnosis is usually unclear prior to chromosomal testing.

Tetrasomy X is generally not inherited but rather occurs via a random event called nondisjunction during gamete or zygote development. The formal term for the karyotype (Note: 'Karyotype' as a term has multiple meanings, all of which are used here. It may refer to a person's chromosome complement, to the test used to discern said chromosome complement, or to an image of chromosomes ascertained via such a test.) observed in tetrasomy X is 48,XXXX, as the condition is typified by a 48-chromosome complement rather than the 46 chromosomes observed in normal human development.

== Presentation ==
Tetrasomy X has a variable presentation with a spectrum of severity, and lacks obvious defining clinical abnormalities that can lead to a diagnosis in the absence of testing. Recognizable characteristics include increased height and mild intellectual disability; the average adult height in tetrasomy X is 169 cm (5 ft 6 1/2 in) compared with a reference height of around 162 cm (5 ft 4 in) for women in the Anglosphere, while a review of the first 27 women to be diagnosed with tetrasomy X found IQs ranging from 30 to 101 with a mean of 62. Although some degree of intellectual disability is traditionally characteristic, two medically reported cases were of normal intelligence, and patient organizations report members who are only afflicted by specific learning disabilities such as dyslexia. Speech and language delays may be associated with tetrasomy X, although the matter is unclear; some reports describe speech and language abilities in line with overall intelligence, while others describe problems independent of intelligence, in particular with subjects who have normal intelligence but significant language delays.

A number of facial and musculoskeletal anomalies are common to all aneuploidies of the sex chromosomes, (Note: Aneuploidy is the presence of too many or too few chromosomes in a cell.) including X chromosome polysomy such as tetrasomy X. Epicanthic folds (additional skin folds in the corners of the eyes) and hypertelorism (wide-spaced eyes) are frequent facial features. Multiple reports have described the characteristic facial features as "coarse". These dysmorphic features are relatively mild and do not necessarily "stand out from the crowd"; in general, X chromosome polysomy is not associated with severe physical dysmorphism, although tetrasomy and pentasomy X tend to be somewhat more noticeable in this respect than the milder and more frequent trisomy X. Hypotonia (low muscle tone), often severe and early-onset, is a commonly observed musculoskeletal abnormality. Clinodactyly, the bending inwards of the pinky finger, and radioulnar synostosis, the fusion of the long bones in the forearm, are frequent. Dental abnormalities are associated with the syndrome, in particular taurodontism, where the pulp of the teeth is enlarged and extends into the roots. These findings are not unique to tetrasomy X; epicanthic folds and hypertelorism are seen in trisomy X, while clinodactyly and radioulnar synostosis are findings common to all sex chromosome aneuploidies and taurodontism is prevalent in X-chromosome polysomy specifically.

Heart defects of various types have been associated with the syndrome, albeit at unclear prevalence. A patient organization reports approximately one-third of cases in its membership had congenital heart defects, a larger proportion than reported in the medical literature. Frequently reported heart defects include patent ductus arteriosus and ventricular septal defects. Kidney and bladder issues have been loosely associated with the syndrome, as has epilepsy. Epilepsy in sex chromosome aneuploidies generally is mild, amenable to treatment, and often attenuates or disappears with time. There is also a potential association between tetrasomy X and autoimmune disorders, particularly lupus, which has been recorded in two women with tetrasomy X and appears to become more common as the number of X chromosomes increase.

The psychological and behavioural phenotype of tetrasomy X is understudied. Some reports describe girls and women with tetrasomy X as generally placid and pleasant, while others report emotional lability and inappropriate behaviour. Family background and environment have a significant impact on behaviour, and cases with severe behavioural dysfunction frequently have similarly dysfunctional unaffected relatives. Expressive language delays and executive dysfunction are common heralds of behavioural issues, due to the difficulties they cause for educational, vocational, and social functioning. In both men and women X-chromosome polysomy is known to be associated with psychosis, and a case is known of a girl with tetrasomy X and childhood-onset schizophrenia. Parent reports describe children and young adults who are generally pleasant and affectionate yet shy, and have issues relating to temper tantrums, mood swings, and frustration at an inability to communicate.

Tetrasomy X can interfere with pubertal development. Of the adult women recorded with tetrasomy X, half have had normal pubertal development with menarche at an appropriate age, while the other half have had some form of pubertal dysfunction such as primary amenorrhea, irregular menstrual cycles, or incomplete development of secondary sex characteristics. Premature ovarian failure, or early menopause, has been recorded. In trisomy X, premature menopause has occurred between the ages of 19 and 40, while in tetrasomy X, it has been recorded as young as 15. In tetrasomy X as for other causes of premature menopause or incomplete puberty, some writers have recommended hormone replacement therapy. Fertility in tetrasomy X is possible. In the first discussion of the phenomenon, three cases have been reported of women bearing children. One woman had two children, one with a normal chromosome complement and the other with Down syndrome. Two women had one child each; one had a daughter with normal chromosomes, while the other had a stillbirth with an omphalocele. An additional woman was reported as having three children, all with normal chromosomes.

== Causes ==
Nondisjunction in tetrasomy X

Tetrasomy X, like other aneuploidy disorders, is caused by a process called nondisjunction. Nondisjunction occurs when homologous chromosomes or sister chromatids fail to separate properly during meiosis, the process that produces gametes (eggs or sperm), and result in gametes with too many or too few chromosomes. In the specific case of sex chromosome tetrasomy and pentasomy, nondisjunction occurs multiple times with the same parent; for tetrasomy X specifically, all known cases have inherited either three maternal X chromosomes and one paternal, or four maternal X chromosomes with no paternal contribution. The cause of this specific pattern of inheritance is unclear. An early research group proposed that due to the gap in prevalence between the related conditions 49,XXXXY, which has a similar prevalence to tetrasomy X, and pentasomy X, which is far rarer, the paternal X chromosomes may frequently be lost in high-level aneuploidy. More recently, speculation has been based in genomic imprinting, with the suggestion that a similarly high number of paternal X-chromosomes would be incompatible with life. Nondisjunction can also occur after conception, which frequently results in a mosaic karyotype.

Nondisjunction is related to advanced maternal age. In common aneuploidies such as Down syndrome, the relationship with maternal age is extensively studied. In Klinefelter syndrome, the most common and most studied sex chromosome aneuploidy, incidence increases substantially as maternal age rises. Less is understood about the role of maternal age in sex chromosome tetrasomy and pentasomy conditions, primarily due to their rarity, and no clear relationship has been established.

Tetrasomy X is generally a random occurrence and does not recur in the same family. In rare cases, it may be related to a mother having trisomy X, mosaic or otherwise. It is not caused by environmental factors.

== Diagnosis ==
Chromosome aneuploidies such as tetrasomy X are diagnosed via karyotype, the process in which chromosomes are tested from blood, bone marrow, amniotic fluid, or placental cells. Due to significant differential diagnosis potential, diagnosis cannot be made on the basis of phenotype alone.

=== Differential diagnosis ===
Tetrasomy X has many possibilities for differential diagnosis, with multiple other conditions overlapping with the phenotype. One differential diagnosis is trisomy X, in which a female has three copies of the X chromosome. The two conditions have overlapping phenotypes with a broad range of severity. Both are associated with hypotonia, mild facial anomalies such as hypertelorism and epicanthic folds, increased height, premature ovarian failure, and some reduction in intelligence. However, the phenotype of tetrasomy X is generally more severe than that of trisomy X. In addition, while both are associated to some degree with tall stature, the association is much stronger for trisomy X. The clinical portrait is made more complex by the possibility of mosaicism, where both 47,XXX and 48,XXXX cell lines are present; such cases frequently, but not certainly, present closer to the tetrasomy than trisomy profile. As well as simple 47,XXX/48,XXXX mosaicism, complex 46,XX/47,XXX/48,XXXX mosaicism has been reported.

Pentasomy X, a karyotype of five X chromosomes, is another major differential diagnosis. The phenotype of pentasomy X is similar but on average more severe. Intellectual disability is more severe, with an average IQ of 50, and pubertal delay or incomplete puberty appears more common. Unlike other X-chromosome polysomies, pentasomy X is associated with short stature. Similarly, pentasomy X is commonly associated with findings that are infrequent in tetrasomy X such as microcephaly and intrauterine growth restriction. Cases of 48,XXXX/49,XXXXX mosaicism have been reported, and are often categorized as cases of pentasomy X. More complex mosaics have been reported, such as 47,XXX/48,XXXX/49,XXXXX and 45,X0/46,XX/47,XXX/48,XXXX/49,XXXXX.

An additional differential diagnosis in some cases is Down syndrome. Some cases of tetrasomy X have been described as having "a false air of trisomy 21" (the underlying chromosomal aneuploidy in Down's), and karyotyping resulting in a diagnosis of tetrasomy X has been performed due to suspicion of Down syndrome. However, this is only a differential diagnosis for a subset of cases, while others have more normal phenotypes or abnormalities inconsistent with the Down's profile. The matter is complicated by the observation that a number of women with X chromosome polysomy, including tetrasomy X, have had children with Down syndrome.

== Prognosis ==
The long-term prognosis for tetrasomy X appears generally good. While life expectancy is unclear, patients have been diagnosed in their 50s and 60s, and long-term follow-up of individual cases shows healthy aging with good physical health. Some women live fully independent lives, while others require more persistent support from parents and caregivers, consistent with other intellectual disability syndromes of comparable severity. Many are able to work part-time, and some full-time; some young women attend tertiary education, mostly vocational. Girls and women with tetrasomy X and good outcomes are typified by supportive family environments and strong personal advocacy for their success; "[t]he children have been exposed to many varied activities and experiences and are praised for their strengths, while their limitations and delays are minimised". Adolescents should undergo screening for ovarian insufficiency, as hormone replacement therapy may be required to mitigate the risk of osteoporosis.

== Epidemiology ==
Tetrasomy X is estimated to occur in approximately 1 in 50,000 females, but due to infrequent diagnosis, as of the early 2020s, has a clinical prevalence of less than 1 in one million people. Considering the variable phenotype, tetrasomy X support organizations and researchers think it likely there are many cases that have not come to medical attention. This is common to all sex chromosome aneuploidies, which have very low diagnosis rates compared to their overall population prevalence. Overall, sex chromosome tetrasomy and pentasomy disorders occur in 1 in 18,000 to 1 in 100,000 male live births and are somewhat rarer in females.

Tetrasomy X only occurs in females, as the Y chromosome is in most cases necessary for male sexual development. (Note: Male phenotypes, innate or induced, with forms of X chromosome polysomy that are usually phenotypically female do occur. For trisomy X, a trans man and several men with sex reversal have been recorded.)

== History ==
Tetrasomy X was first recorded in 1961 in two intellectually disabled women residing in an institution. The late 1950s and early 1960s were a period of frequent ascertainment of previously unknown sex chromosome aneuploidies, with the discovery of the 48,XXXX karyotype being alongside that of 45,X0, 47,XXY, and 47,XXX in 1959, 48,XXYY in 1960, and 47,XYY the same year. One of the two women first diagnosed with tetrasomy X was followed up twenty-six years later in her late fifties, by which time she had left the institution and was living semi-independently with her sister; she was in good physical health, had experienced menarche and menopause at typical ages (14 and 50), and showed no signs of cognitive decline.

Much of the medical literature for tetrasomy X dates to the 1960s and 1970s, an era of particular interest in and research on sex chromosome aneuploidy. Early reports were frequently discovered during chromosome screenings in institutions for the intellectually disabled. The early preference for diagnosis of sex chromosome aneuploidy in selected samples, such as institution residents and prisoners, led to a biased perspective on the conditions that painted an unduly negative portrait of their phenotypes and prognoses. Further research on sex chromosome aneuploidy via unselected samples such as newborn screening allowed for major conditions such as XYY syndrome, Klinefelter syndrome, and trisomy X to be re-defined by more representative phenotypes; however, rarer conditions such as tetrasomy X were not ascertained in any such studies, and therefore the medical literature continues to describe cases that were diagnosed due to developmental or behavioural issues. Aspects of the early studies remain accepted; a 1969 proposal that each supernumerary X chromosome reduces IQ by an average of 15 points is still used as a rule of thumb.

Sex chromosome tetrasomy and pentasomy conditions have consistently received little attention compared to the more common trisomy conditions. Research into conditions such as tetrasomy X has been stymied by biased samples, outdated information, and a lack of publications above the case report level. Dedicated patient and family support groups, such as Unique and the Tetrasomy and Pentasomy X Support Group, began to appear online in the early 2000s. A patient registry in the United Kingdom was established in 2004, amidst concerns that little serious research had been conducted on tetrasomy X for many years.

Diagnosis of sex chromosome aneuploidies is increasing, as is the number of supports available for families. The rarity of and variation in tetrasomy X limits the amount of specific support available, but major chromosome disorder organizations serve the condition and have members who are or are associates of people with it.

== See also ==
- Sex chromosome anomalies
