= Trisomy X =

Chromosome disorder in women

- Other names: 47,XXX, triple X syndrome, triplo-X syndrome, XXX syndrome
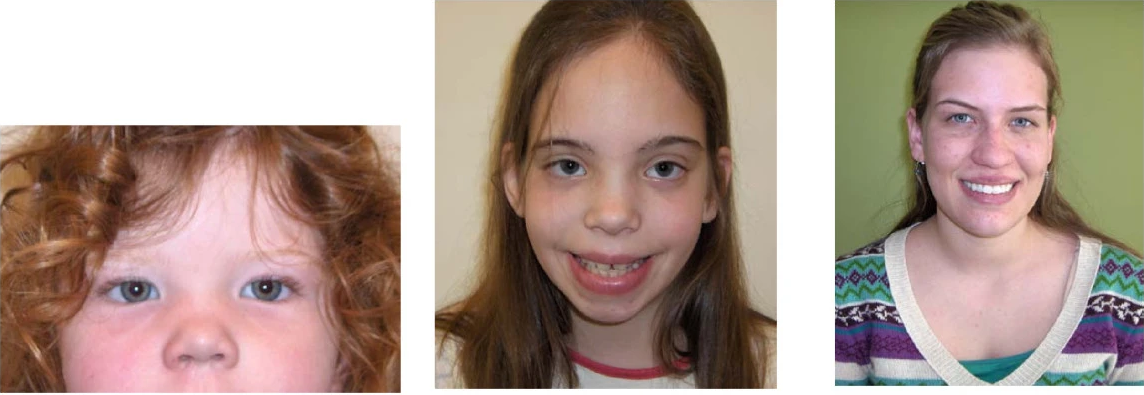
- Three individuals with trisomy X
- Specialty: Medical genetics
- Symptoms: Tall stature, skeletal anomalies, minor neurocognitive and behavioural difficulties
- Usual onset: Conception
- Duration: Lifelong
- Causes: Nondisjunction
- Diagnostic method: Karyotype
- Frequency: Approximately 1 in 1,000 female live births

Trisomy X, also known as triple X syndrome and characterized by the karyotype (Note: 'Karyotype' as a term has multiple meanings, all of which are used here. It may refer to a person's chromosome complement, to the test used to discern said chromosome complement, or to an image of chromosomes ascertained via such a test.) 47,XXX, is a chromosome disorder in which a female has an extra copy of the X chromosome. It is relatively common and occurs in 1 in 1,000 females, but is rarely diagnosed; fewer than 10% of those with the condition know they have it.

Those who have symptoms can have learning disabilities, mild dysmorphic features such as hypertelorism (wide-spaced eyes) and clinodactyly (incurved little fingers), early menopause, and increased height. As the symptoms of trisomy X are often not serious enough to prompt a karyotype test, many cases of trisomy X are diagnosed before birth via prenatal screening tests such as amniocentesis. Most females with trisomy X live normal lives, although their socioeconomic status is reduced compared to the general population.

Trisomy X occurs via a process called nondisjunction, in which normal cell division is interrupted and produces gametes with too many or too few chromosomes. Nondisjunction is a random occurrence, and most girls and women with trisomy X have no family histories of chromosome aneuploidy. (Note: Aneuploidy is the presence of too many or too few chromosomes in a cell.) Advanced maternal age is mildly associated with trisomy X. Women with trisomy X can have children of their own, who in most cases do not have an increased risk of chromosome disorders; women with mosaic trisomy X, who have a mixture of 46,XX (the typical female karyotype) and 47,XXX cells, may have an increased risk of chromosomally abnormal children.

First reported in 1959 by the geneticist Patricia Jacobs, the early understanding of trisomy X was that of a debilitating disability observed in institutionalized women. Beginning in the 1960s, studies of people with sex chromosome aneuploidies from birth to adulthood found that they are often only mildly affected, fitting in with the general population, and that many never needed the attention of clinicians because of the condition.

== Presentation ==
Trisomy X has variable effects, ranging from no symptoms at all to significant disability. Severity varies between people diagnosed prenatally (before birth) and postnatally (after birth), and postnatal cases are more severe on average. Symptoms associated with trisomy X include tall stature, mild developmental delay, subtle physical and skeletal anomalies, increased rates of mental health concerns, and earlier age of menopause.

=== Physiological ===
The physical and physiological impacts of trisomy X tend to be subtle. Tall stature is one of the major physical associations of trisomy X. Prior to age four, most young females with trisomy X are average height; growth picks up after this age, and is particularly rapid between the ages of four and eight. Of girls with trisomy X aged six to thirteen, 40% are above the 90th percentile in height. The added height in trisomy X is primarily in the limbs, with long legs and a shorter sitting height. Though head circumference is generally below the 50th percentile, microcephaly, a head circumference below the 5th percentile, is rare.

Minor skeletal and craniofacial anomalies are associated with trisomy X. Subtle dysmorphisms seen in some females with trisomy X include hypertelorism (wide-spaced eyes), epicanthic folds (an additional fold of skin in the corners of the eyes), and upslanting palpebral fissures (the opening between the eyelids). These differences are usually minor and do not impact the daily lives of girls and women with the condition. Other skeletal anomalies associated with trisomy X include clinodactyly (incurved little fingers), radioulnar synostosis (the fusion of the long bones in the forearm), flat feet, and hyper-extensible joints. These findings are not unique to trisomy X, but rather are seen in sex chromosome aneuploidy disorders as a whole.

Severe internal disease is rare in trisomy X. Genitourinary conditions are more common than in the general population, particularly kidney and ovary malformations. Lupus, an autoimmune disease, is more common in women than men by a factor of 9 and the risk is further exacerbated in Trisomy X by a factor of approximately 2.5. According to one study Sjögren syndrome is also more common in trisomy X than in the general population. Conditions such as sleep apnea, asthma, scoliosis, and hip dysplasia have also been linked to sex chromosome aneuploidies as a whole, including trisomy X. Although heart defects are common in pentasomy X, they are no more frequent in trisomy X than the general population.

Puberty starts around the expected age and progresses as normal. Median anti-Müllerian hormone levels are lower, corresponding to a smaller ovarian reserve, menopause begins five years earlier on average, and there is an increased risk of premature ovarian failure (POF). Among women with POF Trisomy X is over-represented by a factor of five and those with both trisomy and autoimmune disease are at extra high risk. The rate of miscarriage is normal, and fertility has been reported to be either unaffected or somewhat lower than expected. IVF and similar interventions are seldom necessary.

=== Neurodevelopmental ===
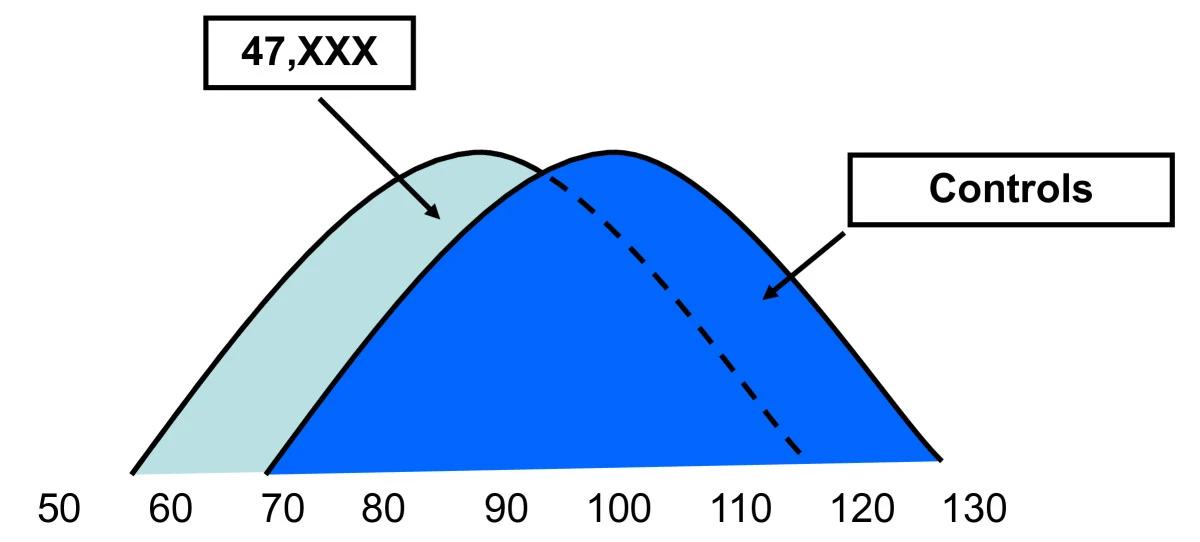
IQ curve for trisomy X compared to controls

General cognitive functioning is reduced in trisomy X, with an average intelligence quotient of 85–90. Performance IQ tends to be higher than verbal IQ. Though intellectual disability is rare, it is more prevalent than in the general population, occurring in about 5–10% of females with trisomy X compared to approximately 1% of the broader population. While the average is lower, the effect of trisomy X varies substantially, and some women are highly intelligent.

Infant milestones are normal to slightly delayed. Speech delay is more common than delays in early motor function. Speech therapy is needed in 40%–90% of girls with trisomy X at some point in their lives. More than 75% experience learning disabilities, frequently related to reading skills, but expressive language skills tend to be more affected than receptive skills. Visuospatial ability may also be diminished.

Neuroimaging in trisomy X demonstrates decreased whole brain volumes, correlated with overall intellectual functioning, although cortical thickness is unaffected. These findings are common to X-chromosome polysomy syndromes, including Klinefelter syndrome. Epilepsy or electroencephalogram abnormalities may be more common in those with trisomy X, particularly those who are also intellectually disabled. Epilepsy in sex chromosome aneuploidies as a whole is mild, amenable to treatment, and often attenuates or disappears with time. Tremor is reported in approximately a quarter of women with trisomy X and responds to the same treatments as in the general population.

Executive dysfunction, where people have difficulty regulating their actions and emotions, is more prevalent amongst those with trisomy X than in the general population. Autism spectrum disorders are more common in trisomy X, and approximately 15% of girls with trisomy X have significant symptoms indicative of such disorders, compared to less than 1% of girls in the general population. The risk of ADHD is also increased, and up to 50% of those with Trisomy X are affected.

=== Psychological ===
Impaired social regulation is more common in trisomy X and is in part dependent on emotional dysregulation but also dependent on environmental factors. Girls growing up in stable environments with healthy home lives tend to have relatively high adaptive and social functioning, while significant behavioural and psychological issues are predominantly seen in those from troubled social environments. Though girls with trisomy X usually have good relationships with peers, they trend towards immaturity; some behavioural issues in children with trisomy X are thought to be a consequence of the disconnect between apparent age, as understood via increased height, and cognitive and emotional maturity encouraging hard-to-reach expectations. Girls whose motor and language skills are more severely affected by trisomy X often experience low confidence and self-esteem. These traits vary in severity; though some women with trisomy X are significantly impaired, many are within the normal range of variance, and some are high-functioning and high-achieving.

Some mental health issues are more frequent in women with trisomy X. Dysthymia and cyclothymia, milder forms of depression and bipolar disorder, respectively, are more common than in the general population. Women with trisomy X average higher schizotypy, reporting higher levels of introversion, magical thinking, and impulsivity. Around 30% are affected by thought problems, and 13% have been diagnosed with psychotic or bipolar disorders. Schizophrenic women are more likely to have trisomy X than the general female population. The prevalence of trisomy X in women with adult-onset schizophrenia is estimated to be around 1 in 400, compared to 1 in 1,000 in women as a whole; the prevalence in childhood onset schizophrenia is unclear, but may be as high as 1 in 40. One in five women with trisomy X report clinically significant levels of anxiety. Estimates of the prevalence of clinical depression vary between 18 and 54%. Women with trisomy X are often "late bloomers", experiencing high rates of psychological distress into early adulthood, but by their mid-thirties have stronger interpersonal bonds and healthy relationships. The study of mental health in trisomy X is complicated by the fact that girls and women who were diagnosed before birth seem to be more mildly affected than those diagnosed after. For instance, psychogenic stomach pains are reported in a disproportionate number of postnatally diagnosed patients, but fewer prenatally diagnosed ones.

=== Mosaic forms ===
The most common karyotype in trisomy X is 47,XXX, where all cells have an additional copy of the X chromosome. Mosaicism, where both 47,XXX and other cell lines are present, occurs in over 30% of cases. Mosaic trisomy X can have different outcomes to the non-mosaic condition and further contributes to the variability seen in Trisomy X. Common mosaic forms observed include 46,XX/47,XXX, 45,X/47,XXX (with a Monosomy X cell line), and 47,XXX/48,XXXX (with a tetrasomy X cell line). Complex mosaicism, with cell lines such as 45,X/46,XX/47,XXX, can also be seen.

==== 46,XX/47,XXX ====
The simplest form of mosaic trisomy X, with a 46,XX/47,XXX karyotype, is milder compared to full trisomy X. There is still an increased occurrence of birth defects, as well as skin and urogenital disorders. Cognitive development is more typical, with improved long-term life outcomes. Although generally milder, 46,XX/47,XXX mosaicism is associated with a higher risk of chromosome anomalies in offspring than full trisomy X. The increased risk of abnormal offspring in mosaicism has been hypothesized to be a consequence of oocyte abnormality in 46,XX/47,XXX women not seen in full 47,XXX. Some writers have recommended women with 46,XX/47,XXX karyotypes undergo screening for chromosomal disorders during pregnancy.

==== 45,X/47,XXX ====
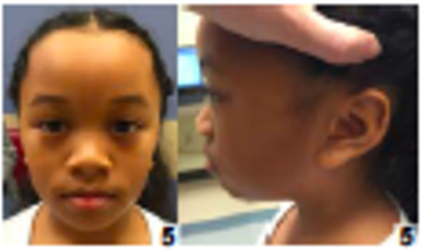
A nine-year-old girl with a 45,X0/47,XXX karyotype

Around 5% of females with Turner syndrome, defined by a karyotype with a single copy of the X chromosome, have a 47,XXX cell line. Mosaic karyotypes with both 45,X and 47,XXX cells are considered Turner syndrome rather than trisomy X, but the presence of 47,XXX cells influences the disorder, with milder effects than non-mosaic Turner syndrome. Most are still affected by short stature, and early premature ovarian failure (before age 30) is common, but a majority reach puberty and menarche spontaneously. Almost all women with regular Turner syndrome are sterile, but those with 47,XXX cell lines are typically fertile. Although women with trisomy X have lower IQs than the general population and women with Turner syndrome do not, intellectual disability does not appear to be more common in the mosaic than for non-mosaic Turner's. Women with mosaic Turner syndrome tend to have similar dysmorphic features to those with non-mosaic Turner's syndrome, but less marked, and some have none of the traditional visible Turner traits.

==== 47,XXX/48,XXXX ====
Mosaicism with a tetrasomy X cell line generally appears more severe than typical trisomy X. Like trisomy X, tetrasomy X has a variable phenotype muddled by underdiagnosis. The tetrasomy is generally more severe than the trisomy; intellectual disability is characteristic, dysmorphological features are more visible, and puberty is often altered.

== Causes ==
Maternal (top) and paternal (bottom) nondisjunction leading to trisomy X

Trisomy X, like other aneuploidy disorders, is caused by a process called nondisjunction. Nondisjunction occurs when homologous chromosomes or sister chromatids fail to separate properly during meiosis, the process that produces gametes (eggs or sperm), and result in gametes with too many or too few chromosomes. Nondisjunction can occur during gametogenesis, where the trisomy is present from conception, or zygote development, where it occurs after conception. When nondisjunction occurs after conception, the resulting karyotype is generally mosaic, with both 47,XXX and other cell lines.

Most cases of trisomy X occur through maternal nondisjunction, with around 90% of cases traced to errors in oogenesis. The vast majority of cases of trisomy X occur randomly; they have nothing to do with the chromosomes of the parents and little chance of recurring in the family. Nondisjunction is related to advanced maternal age, and trisomy X specifically appears to have a small but significant maternal age effect. In a cohort of women with trisomy X born in the 1960s, the average maternal age was 33. The risk of women with full trisomy X having chromosomally abnormal children is low, likely below 1%. Recurrence may occur if the mother has mosaicism for trisomy X, particularly in ovarian cells, but this makes up a small fraction of cases.

Proposed mechanisms behind the phenotype of Trisomy X include incomplete X-chromosome inactivation, and corresponding changes to DNA methylation and gene expression across the entire genome. X-inactivation is never total and around 15% of genes on the second X chromosome are only partially deactivated, but it is unknown to what extent genes on the third chromosome escape inactivation. With respect to specific genes increased copy numbers of the X-chromosomal SHOX gene has been linked to increased height.

== Diagnosis and differential diagnosis ==
Chromosome aneuploidies such as trisomy X are diagnosed via karyotype, the process in which chromosomes are tested from blood, bone marrow, amniotic fluid, or placental cells. As trisomy X is generally mild or asymptomatic, most cases are never diagnosed. Around 10% of cases of trisomy X are diagnosed in the person's lifetime; many are ascertained coincidentally during prenatal testing via amniocentesis or chorionic villi sampling, which is routinely performed for advanced maternal age. Postnatal testing is typically prompted by tall stature, hypotonia, developmental disability, mild dysmorphic features such as hypertelorism or clinodactyly, and premature ovarian failure.

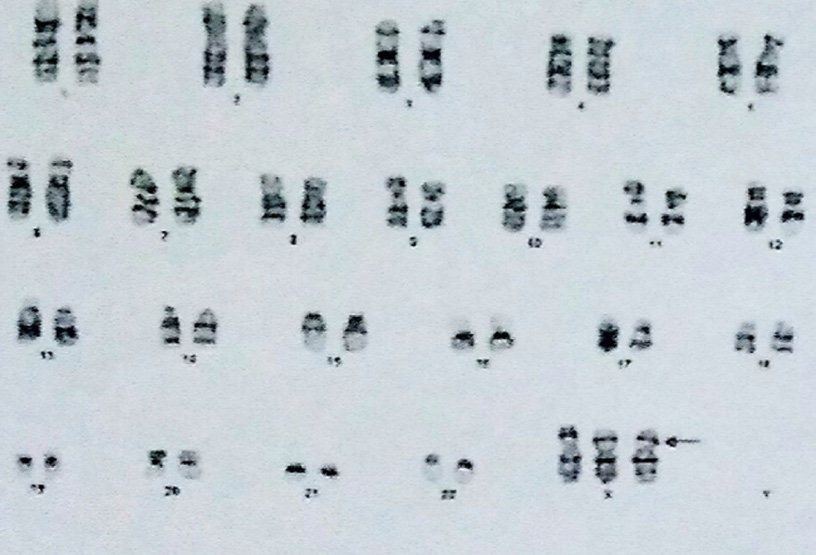
Karyotype of trisomy X

Tetrasomy X, characterized by four copies of the X chromosome, has some signs in common with more severe cases of trisomy X. Intellectual disability, generally mild, is more frequently seen in the tetrasomy than the trisomy. There is more of a tendency towards noticeable dysmorphic features such as hypertelorism, clinodactyly, and epicanthic folds. Unlike trisomy X, approximately half of women with tetrasomy X have no or incomplete pubertal development. Although in most cases, tetrasomy X is significantly more severe than trisomy X, some cases of tetrasomy X are mild, and some cases of trisomy X are severe. Like trisomy X, the full phenotypic range of tetrasomy X is unknown due to underdiagnosis. Pentasomy X, with five X chromosomes, may rarely be a differential diagnosis for trisomy X. The phenotype of pentasomy X is more severe than the trisomy or tetrasomy, with significant intellectual disability, heart defects, microcephaly, and short stature.

Due to overlapping dysmorphic features, such as epicanthic folds and upslanting palpebral fissures, some cases of trisomy X may be ascertained due to suspicion of Down syndrome. When the primary symptom is tall stature, trisomy X may be considered alongside other conditions depending on the rest of the phenotype. Marfan syndrome may be considered due to the disproportion between limb and torso length observed in both syndromes, as well as both experiencing joint issues. Beckwith-Wiedemann syndrome, another disproportionate tall stature syndrome, can cause developmental disability similar to that seen in some cases of trisomy X.

As karyotypic diagnosis is conclusive, differential diagnosis can be abandoned after karyotype in most cases of trisomy X. However, due to the relatively high prevalence of trisomy X, other congenital disorders may occur alongside a 47,XXX karyotype. Differential diagnosis remains indicated when the phenotype is particularly severe for what a 47,XXX karyotype alone explains, such as severe intellectual disability or significant malformation.

== Prognosis ==
"My doctor told us that if our unborn daughter had to have a genetic issue, Trisomy X is the one to have, so to speak. He said that many girls with this condition are completely normal, and that it is not physically noticeable. The issues that we could have might be with speech and motor delays or learning disabilities. [...] The doctor did have us speak with a genetic counselor, but no one encouraged us to terminate, and we did not consider it."

— Parent of a daughter with trisomy X

The prognosis of trisomy X is broadly good, with adult independence most often achieved, if delayed. Most adults achieve normal life outcomes, pursuing education, employment, or homemaking. Childhood and adolescence, particularly in compulsory education, tends to be more difficult for those with trisomy X than adult life. Parents report their daughters' struggling both academically and socially at school, particularly during secondary education, while adults report better adaptation after leaving education and entering the workforce. Of the women in the cohort studies followed to early adulthood, 7 of 37 dropped out of high school, while three attended university. Compared to age-matched women in the general population, women with trisomy X are 68% as likely to live with a partner, 64% as likely to have children, 36% as likely to hold higher education qualifications, and almost twice as likely to be retired from the workforce.

Physical health is generally good and many women with trisomy X live into old age. Little data exists on aging in trisomy X. Data from the Danish Cytogenetic Central Register, which covers 13% of women with trisomy X in Denmark, suggests a life expectancy of 71 for women with full trisomy X and 78 for mosaics, compared to 84 for controls. The limited sample, composed only of women with trisomy X who have come to medical attention, has led to speculation this number is an underestimate.

Women with trisomy X who were diagnosed prenatally have better outcomes as a group than those diagnosed postnatally, and 46,XX/47,XXX mosaics better than those with full trisomy X. Some of the improved outcome in prenatal diagnosis appears to be a function of higher socioeconomic status amongst parents.

== Epidemiology ==
Trisomy X is a relatively common genetic disorder, occurring in around 1 in 1,000 female births. Due to its subtle effects, at most 10% of cases are diagnosed during their lifetime. Large cytogenetic studies in Denmark find a diagnosed prevalence of 6 in 100,000 females, around 7% of the actual number of girls and women with trisomy X expected to exist in the general population. Diagnosis in the United Kingdom is particularly low, with an estimated 2% of cases medically recognized. Amongst the 244,000 women in the UK Biobank research sample, 110 were found to have 47,XXX karyotypes, corresponding to approximately half the number expected in the population. The fact this number is still reduced compared to the broader population is thought to be an effect of UK Biobank participants being less likely to be of low IQ and low socioeconomic status than the general population, both of which are more frequent in trisomy X.

Trisomy X only occurs in females, as the Y chromosome is in most cases necessary for male sexual development. (Note: Male phenotypes, innate or induced, with forms of X chromosome polysomy that are usually phenotypically female do occur. For trisomy X, a trans man and several men with sex reversal have been recorded.) In addition to its high base rate, trisomy X is more common in some clinical subpopulations. The karyotype occurs in an estimated 3% of women with early menopause, 1 in 350 with Sjögren syndrome, and 1 in 400 with systemic lupus erythematosus.

Rate and age of diagnosis
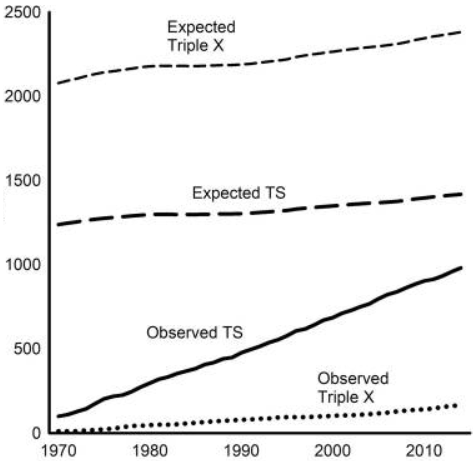
Expected and observed number of people diagnosed with trisomy X and Turner syndrome in Denmark

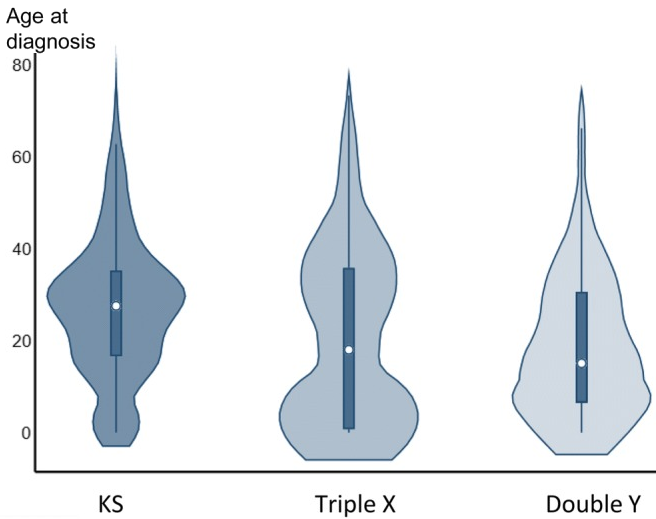
Violin plots of age at diagnosis for Klinefelter syndrome, trisomy X, and XYY syndrome

== History ==
The first known case of trisomy X, in a 176 cm (5 ft 9 1/2 in) woman who experienced premature ovarian failure at the age of 19, was diagnosed in 1959 by a team led by Patricia Jacobs. The late 1950s and early 1960s were a period of frequent ascertainment of previously unknown sex chromosome aneuploidies, with the 47,XXX karyotype discovered alongside 45,X and 47,XXY the same year. Early studies on sex chromosome aneuploidy screened patients residing in institutions, depicting the karyotypes as incapacitating; even at the time, this research was criticized for giving an inaccurate portrait of sex chromosome aneuploidy. Early reports of women with trisomy X have since been criticized for a dehumanizing ableist perspective, showing nude photographs of institutionalized women described as "mental deficiency patients".

In response to the biased early studies, a newborn screening program for sex chromosome aneuploidy disorders was implemented in the 1960s. Almost 200,000 neonates were screened in Aarhus, Toronto, New Haven, Denver, Edinburgh, and Winnipeg; those found to have sex chromosome aneuploidies were followed up for 20 years for most of the cohorts, and longer for the Edinburgh and Denver cohorts. The children with trisomy X and Klinefelter's had their karyotypes disclosed to their parents, but due to the then-present perception that XYY syndrome was associated with violent criminality, those diagnoses were hidden from the family.

These studies dispelled the idea that sex chromosome aneuploidies were "tantamount to a life of serious handicaps" and revealed their high prevalence in the population. They provided extensive information on the outcomes of trisomy X and other sex chromosome aneuploidies, forming much of the medical literature on the topic to this day. However, the small sample sizes of the long-term follow-ups in particular stymies extrapolation; by 1999, only 16 women in Edinburgh were still being followed. In 2007, Nicole Tartaglia founded the eXtraordinarY Kids Clinic in Denver to study children with sex chromosome aneuploidies; around one-fifth of patients at the clinic had trisomy X as of 2015. Several centers modeled on the clinic have since opened across the US. In 2020, she introduced the eXtraordinarY Babies Study, a planned cohort study on people prenatally diagnosed with sex chromosome aneuploidies.

The first description of trisomy X used the term 'superfemale' to describe the karyotype by analogy to Drosophila flies, a term that was immediately disputed. Curt Stern proposed the use of 'metafemale', which Jacobs criticized as both medically inaccurate and an "illegitimate product of a Graeco-Roman alliance". Bernard Lennon, opposing the use of 'superfemale' as misleading and possessed of an inappropriate "emotional element", suggested 'XXX syndrome'. For some years, the disorder was predominantly known as 'triple X syndrome' or 'triple X', though the latter is now discouraged. In 2022 Trisomy X was included alongside XYY at the 3rd International Workshop on Klinefelter Syndrome, which concluded that the body of research was insufficient to formulate robust guidelines for Trisomy X.

== Society and culture ==
Awareness and diagnosis of sex chromosome aneuploidies is increasing. In the late 2010s, several state governments across the United States declared May to be National X & Y Chromosome Variation Awareness Month.

Descriptions of trisomy X overwhelmingly consider the karyotype from a medical perspective, rather than a sociological or educational one. One topic in the sociological discussion of trisomy X and other sex chromosome aneuploidies is disability-selective abortion. Fetuses with sex chromosome aneuploidies are more likely to be aborted, though fetuses with trisomy X are less likely than for such conditions as a whole. A literature review of 19 studies found that nearly one-third of pregnancies with a child with trisomy X were aborted; it also found that parents who were counselled by a genetic counseller with expertise in sex chromosome aneuploidies, rather than an obstetrician or gynecologist, were less likely to abort. Abortion rates in sex chromosome aneuploidies have decreased over time with improved counselling.

== In other animals ==
Trisomy X has been observed in other species that use the XY sex-determination system. Six cases of trisomy X have been recorded in dogs, for which the karyotype is 79,XXX compared to 78,XX for an euploid female dog. Unlike in humans, trisomy X in dogs is strongly linked to infertility, either primary anestrus or infertility with an otherwise normal estrous cycle. Canine trisomy X is thought to be underascertained, as most pet dogs are desexed and so underlying infertility will not be discovered. Three of the six known cases of canine trisomy X demonstrated behavioural issues such as fearfulness, inciting speculation about a link between the karyotype and psychological concerns as seen in humans with the condition. An additional dog with normal fertility and no reported behavioural issues was found to have a mosaic 78,XX/79,XXX karyotype. The canine X chromosome has a particularly large pseudoautosomal region, and dogs accordingly have a lower rate of monosomy X than observed in other species; however, a large pseudoautosomal region is not considered a contraindication for trisomy X, and canine trisomy X may have a comparable prevalence to the human form.

Trisomy X is also observed in cattle, where it corresponds to a 61,XXX karyotype. A survey of 71 heifers who failed to become pregnant after two breeding seasons found two cases of trisomy X. As of 2021, a total of eight heifers with Trisomy X have been identified, seven of them were infertile. The condition also affects the river buffalo, where the three known cases were sterile.

== See also ==
- Sex chromosome anomalies

== Book sources ==
- Skuse D, Printzlau F, Wolstencroft J (2018). "Sex chromosome aneuploidies". In Geschwind DH, Paulson HL, Klein C (eds.). Handbook of Clinical Neurology. Neurogenetics, Part I. Vol. 147. Elsevier. pp. 355–376. doi:10.1016/b978-0-444-63233-3.00024-5. ISBN 978-0-444-63233-3. PMID 29325624.
- Messer K, D'Epagnier C, Howell S, Tartaglia N (2013). "Trisomy X Syndrome (47,XXX)". Brenner's Encyclopedia of Genetics. Elsevier. pp. 195−197. doi:10.1016/b978-0-12-374984-0.01700-9. ISBN 978-0-08-096156-9.
