= XYY syndrome =

Genetic condition in which a male has an extra Y chromosome

- Other names: 47,XYY
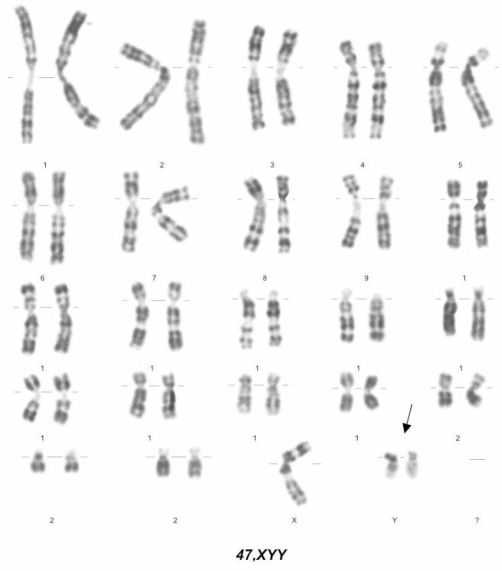
- Karyotype from a male with 47,XYY
- Specialty: Medical genetics
- Symptoms: Mild, being taller than the parents, mildly unusual physical features, poor coordination, weak muscle tone, learning and speech problems
- Usual onset: At conception
- Duration: Lifelong
- Causes: Two Y chromosomes in males
- Diagnostic method: Genetic testing
- Differential diagnosis: Klinefelter syndrome, Marfan syndrome, Sotos syndrome
- Prevention: None
- Treatment: Speech therapy, tutoring
- Prognosis: Normal life expectancy
- Frequency: ~1 in 1,000 males

XYY syndrome, also known as Jacobs syndrome and Superman syndrome, is an aneuploid genetic condition in which a male has an extra Y chromosome. There are usually few symptoms. These may include being taller than average and an increased risk of learning disabilities. Most individuals with this condition have normal fertility.

The condition is generally not inherited but rather occurs as a result of a random event during sperm development. Diagnosis is by a chromosomal analysis, but most of those affected are not diagnosed within their lifetime. There are 47 chromosomes, instead of the usual 46, giving a 47,XYY karyotype.

The condition occurs in about 1 in 1,000 male births. The vast majority of people with the condition are unaware that they have it. The condition was first described in 1961. Some individuals may be offered speech therapy and outcomes are generally positive.

== Signs and symptoms ==
=== Physical traits ===
People with the 47,XYY karyotype have an increased growth rate from early childhood, with an average final height approximately 7 centimetres (2 3/4 in) above expected final height. In Edinburgh, Scotland, eight 47,XYY boys born 1967–1972 and identified in a newborn screening programme had an average height of 188.1 cm (6 ft 2 in) at age 18—their fathers' average height was 174.1 cm (5 ft 8 1/2 in), their mothers' average height was 162.8 cm (5 ft 4 1/8 in). The increased gene dosage of three X/Y chromosome pseudoautosomal region (PAR1) SHOX genes has been postulated as a cause of the increased stature seen in all three sex chromosome trisomies: 47,XXX, 47,XXY, and 47,XYY. Severe acne was noted in a very few early case reports, but dermatologists specializing in acne now doubt the existence of a relationship with 47,XYY.

Prenatal testosterone levels are normal in 47,XYY males. Most 47,XYY males have normal sexual development and have normal fertility.

=== Cognitive and behavioral traits ===
In contrast to the other common sex chromosome aneuploidies—47,XXX and 47,XXY (Klinefelter syndrome)—the average of the IQ scores of 47,XYY boys identified by newborn screening programs was not reduced compared to the general population. In a summary of six prospective studies of 47,XYY boys identified by newborn screening programmes, twenty-eight 47,XYY boys had an average 100.76 verbal IQ, 108.79 performance IQ, and 105.00 full-scale IQ. In a systematic review including two prospective studies of 47,XYY boys identified by newborn screening programs and one retrospective study of 47,XYY men identified by screening men over 184 cm (6 ft 1/2 in) in height, forty-two 47,XYY boys and men had an average 99.5 verbal IQ and 106.4 performance IQ.

In prospective studies of 47,XYY boys identified by newborn screening programs, the IQ scores of 47,XYY boys were usually slightly lower than those of their siblings. In Edinburgh, fifteen 47,XYY boys with siblings identified in a newborn screening program had an average 104.0 verbal IQ and 106.7 performance IQ, while their siblings had an average 112.9 verbal IQ and 114.6 performance IQ.

Approximately half of 47,XYY boys identified by newborn screening programs had learning difficulties—a higher proportion than found among siblings and above-average-IQ control groups. In Edinburgh, 54% of 47,XYY boys (7 of 13) identified in a newborn screening program received remedial reading teaching compared to 18% (4 of 22) in an above-average-IQ control group of 46,XY boys matched by their father's social class. In Boston, USA 55% of 47,XYY boys (6 of 11) identified in a newborn screening program had learning difficulties and received part-time resource room help compared to 11% (1 of 9) in an above-average-IQ control group of 46,XY boys with familial balanced autosomal chromosome translocations.

Developmental delays and behavioral problems are also found, but these characteristics vary widely among affected boys and men, are not unique to 47,XYY and are managed no differently from in 46,XY males. Aggression is not seen more frequently in 47,XYY males.

Patients with XYY syndrome have been shown to have a higher risk of developing certain diseases such as asthma, seizure problems, and tremors. Some 47,XYY patients have been found to have genitourinary malformations. These include cryptorchidism, hypoplastic scrotum, micropenis, and hypospadias. These men could be diagnosed with infertility as a result of oligospermia or sperm chromosomal abnormalities. According to certain psychological studies, people with XYY syndrome may have problems with impulse control and emotional regulation. Increased testosterone levels were found to be correlated with an increased risk of aggressive behavior in incarcerated males with 47,XYY syndrome.

Diagram showing XYY syndrome formation. MI and MII are the stages of meiosis, while the blue and pink circles are male (sperm) and female (ovum) cells, respectively, and the blue and pink bars are Y- and X-chromosomes, respectively. The purple cell has 2 Y-chromosomes and 1 X-chromosome caused by the ovum fusing with a sperm cell with two Y-chromosomes, which was due to division problems in MII of the male.

47,XYY is not inherited; it usually occurs as a random event during the formation of sperm cells. An incident in chromosome separation during anaphase II (of meiosis II) called nondisjunction can result in sperm cells with an extra copy of the Y-chromosome. If one of these atypical sperm cells contributes to the genetic makeup of a child, the child will have an extra Y-chromosome in each of the body's cells.

In some cases, the extra Y-chromosome results from nondisjunction during mitosis in early embryonic development. This can produce 46,XY/47,XYY mosaics.

== Diagnosis ==
47,XYY syndrome is not usually diagnosed until learning issues are present. The syndrome is diagnosed in an increasing number of children prenatally by amniocentesis and chorionic villus sampling in order to obtain a chromosome karyotype, where the abnormality can be observed.

It is estimated that only 15–20% of children with 47,XYY syndrome are ever diagnosed. Of these, approximately 30% are diagnosed prenatally. For the rest of those diagnosed after birth, around half are diagnosed during childhood or adolescence after developmental delays are observed. The rest are diagnosed after any of a variety of symptoms, including fertility problems (5%) have been seen.

== Epidemiology ==
Around 1 in 1,000 boys are born with a 47,XYY karyotype. The incidence of 47,XYY is not known to be affected by the parents' ages.

== History ==
=== 1960s ===
In April 1956, Hereditas published the discovery by cytogeneticists Joe Hin Tjio and Albert Levan at Lund University in Sweden that the normal number of chromosomes in diploid human cells was 46—not 48, as had been believed for the preceding thirty years. In the wake of the establishment of the normal number of human chromosomes, 47,XYY was the last of the common sex chromosome aneuploidies to be discovered, two years after the discoveries of 47,XXY, 45,X and 47,XXX in 1959. Even the much less common 48,XXYY had been discovered in 1960, a year before 47,XYY.

Screening for those X chromosome aneuploidies was possible before the advent of human chromosome analysis by noting the presence or absence of "female" sex chromatin bodies (Barr bodies) in the nuclei of interphase cells in buccal smears, a technique developed a decade before the first reported sex chromosome aneuploidy. An analogous technique to screen for Y-chromosome aneuploidies by noting supernumerary "male" sex chromatin bodies was not developed until 1970, a decade after the first reported male sex chromosome aneuploidy.

The first published report of a man with a 47,XYY karyotype was by the American cytogeneticist Avery Sandberg and his colleagues at Roswell Park Comprehensive Cancer Center (then known as Roswell Park Memorial Institute) in Buffalo, New York in 1961. It was an incidental finding in a normal 44-year-old, 6 ft. [183 cm] tall man of average intelligence who was karyotyped because he had a daughter with Down syndrome. Only a dozen isolated 47,XYY cases were reported in the medical literature in the four years following the first report by Sandberg.

The XYY syndrome, if named after the discoverer, should rightly be termed Sandberg syndrome and not Jacobs syndrome although the British cytogeneticist Patricia Jacobs did indeed contribute meaningfully to medical knowledge of XYY. In December 1965 and March 1966, Nature and The Lancet published the first preliminary reports by Jacobs and her colleagues at the MRC Human Genetics Unit at Western General Hospital in Edinburgh of a chromosome survey of 315 male patients at State Hospital in Carstairs, Lanarkshire—Scotland's only special security hospital for developmentally disabled people—that found nine patients, ages 17 to 36, averaging almost 6 ft. in height (avg. 5'11", range: 5'7" to 6'2"), had a 47,XYY karyotype, and mischaracterized them as aggressive and violent criminals. Over the next decade, almost all published XYY studies were on height-selected, institutionalized XYY males.

In January 1968 and March 1968, The Lancet and Science published the first U.S. reports of tall, institutionalized XYY males by Mary Telfer, a biochemist, and colleagues at the Elwyn Institute. Telfer found five tall, developmentally disabled XYY boys and men in hospitals and penal institutions in Pennsylvania, and since four of the five had at least moderate facial acne, reached the erroneous conclusion that acne was a defining characteristic of XYY males. After learning that convicted mass murderer Richard Speck had been karyotyped, Telfer not only incorrectly assumed the acne-scarred Speck was XYY, but reached the false conclusion that Speck was the archetypical XYY male—or "supermale" as Telfer referred to XYY males outside of peer-reviewed scientific journals.

In April 1968, The New York Times—using Telfer as a main source—introduced the XYY genetic condition to the general public in a three-part series on consecutive days that began with a Sunday front-page story about the planned use of the condition as a mitigating factor in two murder trials in Paris and Melbourne—and falsely reported that Richard Speck was an XYY male and that the condition would be used in an appeal of his murder conviction. The series was echoed the following week by articles—again using Telfer as a main source—in Time and Newsweek, and six months later in The New York Times Magazine.

In December 1968, the Journal of Medical Genetics published the first XYY review article—by Willam Michael Court Brown (1918–1969), director of the MRC Human Genetics Unit—which reported that he had found no overrepresentation of XYY males in nationwide chromosome surveys of prisons and hospitals for developmentally disabled and mentally ill people in Scotland, and concluded that studies confined to institutionalized XYY males may be guilty of selection bias, and that long-term longitudinal prospective studies of newborn XYY boys were needed.

In May 1969, at the annual meeting of the American Psychiatric Association, Telfer and her Elwyn Institute colleagues reported that case studies of the institutionalized XYY and XXY males they had found convinced them that XYY males had been falsely stigmatized and that their behavior may not be significantly different from chromosomally normal 46,XY males.

In June 1969, the National Institute of Mental Health (NIMH) Center for Studies of Crime and Delinquency held a two-day XYY conference in Chevy Chase, Maryland. In December 1969, with a grant from the NIMH Center for Studies of Crime and Delinquency, cytogeneticist Digamber Borgaonkar at Johns Hopkins Hospital began a chromosome survey of (predominantly African-American) boys ages 8 to 18 in all Maryland institutions for delinquent, neglected, or mentally ill juveniles, which was suspended from February–May 1970 due to an American Civil Liberties Union (ACLU) lawsuit regarding the study's lack of informed consent.

In the late 1960s and early 1970s, screening of consecutive newborns for sex chromosome abnormalities was undertaken at seven centers worldwide: in Denver (Jan 1964 – 1974), Edinburgh (Apr 1967 – Jun 1979), New Haven (Oct 1967 – Sep 1968), Toronto (Oct 1967 – Sep 1971), Aarhus (Oct 1969 – Jan 1974, Oct 1980 – Jan 1989), Winnipeg (Feb 1970 – Sep 1973), and Boston (Apr 1970 – Nov 1974). The Boston study, led by Harvard Medical School child psychiatrist Stanley Walzer at Children's Hospital, was unique among the seven newborn screening studies in that it only screened newborn boys (non-private-ward newborn boys at the Boston Hospital for Women) and was funded in part by grants from the NIMH Center for Studies of Crime and Delinquency. The Edinburgh study was led by Shirley Ratcliffe who focused her career on it and published the results in 1999.

=== 1970s ===
In December 1969, Lore Zech at the Karolinska Institute in Stockholm first reported intense fluorescence of the A T-rich distal half of the long arm of the Y chromosome in the nuclei of metaphase cells treated with quinacrine mustard. In April 1970, Peter Pearson and Martin Bobrow at the MRC Population Genetics Unit in Oxford and Canino Vosa at the University of Oxford reported fluorescent "male" sex chromatin bodies in the nuclei of interphase cells in buccal smears treated with quinacrine dihydrochloride, which could be used to screen for Y chromosome aneuploidies like 47,XYY.

In December 1970, at the annual meeting of the American Association for the Advancement of Science (AAAS), its retiring president, geneticist H. Bentley Glass, cheered by the legalization of abortion in New York, envisioned a future where pregnant women would be required by the government to abort XYY "sex deviants". Mischaracterization of the XYY genetic condition was quickly incorporated into high school biology textbooks and medical school psychiatry textbooks, where misinformation still persists decades later.

In 1973, child psychiatrist Herbert Schreier at Children's Hospital told Harvard Medical School microbiologist Jon Beckwith of Science for the People that he thought Walzer's Boston XYY study was unethical; Science for the People investigated the study and, regarding the study, filed an ethics complaint with Harvard Medical School in March 1974. In November 1974, Science for the People went public with their objections to the Boston XYY study in a press conference and a New Scientist article alleging inadequate informed consent, a lack of benefit (since no specific treatment was available) but substantial risk (by stigmatization with a false stereotype) to the subjects, and that the unblinded experimental design could not produce meaningful results regarding the subjects' behavior. In December 1974, the Harvard Standing Committee on Medical Research issued a report supporting the Boston XYY study, and in March 1975, the faculty voted 199–35 to allow continuation of the study. After April 1975, screening of newborns was discontinued—changes to informed consent procedures and pressure from additional advocacy groups, including the Children's Defense Fund, having led to the discontinuation of the last active U.S. newborn screening programs for sex chromosome abnormalities in Boston and Denver.

In a paper published in New Scientist on November 14, 1974, entitled "XYY syndrome: a dangerous myth" found no link was found between having an extra Y chromosome and violent behavior. According to the paper, adolescents found to have an extra Y chromosome in a Maryland institution were chemically sterilized to attempt to maintain "normal behavior," despite this the paper found no major behavioral differences between XY and XYY individuals.

In August 1976, Science published a retrospective cohort study by Educational Testing Service psychologist Herman Witkin and colleagues that screened the tallest 16% of men (over 184 cm (6'0") in height) born in Copenhagen from 1944 to 1947 for XXY and XYY karyotypes, and found an increased rate of minor criminal convictions for property crimes among sixteen XXY and twelve XYY men may be related to the lower intelligence of those with criminal convictions, but found no evidence that XXY or XYY men were inclined to be aggressive or violent.

=== 1980s and later ===
The March of Dimes sponsored five international conferences in June 1974, November 1977, May 1981, June 1984, and June 1989 and published articles from the conferences in book form in 1979, 1982, 1986, and 1991 from seven longitudinal prospective cohort studies on the development of over 300 children and young adults with sex chromosome abnormalities identified in the screening of almost 200,000 consecutive births in hospitals in Denver, Edinburgh, New Haven, Toronto, Aarhus, Winnipeg, and Boston from 1964 to 1975. These seven studies—the only unbiased studies of unselected individuals with sex chromosome abnormalities—have replaced the older, biased studies of institutionalized individuals in understanding the development of individuals with sex chromosome abnormalities.

In May 1997, Nature Genetics published the discovery by Ercole Rao and colleagues of the X/Y chromosome pseudoautosomal region (PAR1) SHOX gene, haploinsufficiency of which leads to short stature in Turner syndrome (45,X). It was subsequently postulated that the increased gene dosage of three SHOX genes leads to tall stature in the sex chromosome trisomies 47,XXX, 47,XXY, and 47,XYY.

In July 1999, Psychological Medicine published a case-control study by Royal Edinburgh Hospital psychiatrist Michael Götz and colleagues that found an increased rate of criminal convictions among seventeen XYY men identified in the Edinburgh newborn screening study compared to an above-average-IQ control group of sixty XY men, which multiple logistic regression analysis indicated was mediated mainly through lowered intelligence.

In June 2002, the American Journal of Medical Genetics published results from a longitudinal prospective cohort Denver Family Development Study led by pediatrician and geneticist Arthur Robinson, which found that in fourteen prenatally diagnosed 47,XYY boys (from high socioeconomic status families), IQ scores available for six boys ranged from 100 to 147 with a mean of 120. For the eleven of fourteen boys with siblings, in nine instances their siblings were stronger academically, but in one case the subject was performing equal to, and in another case superior to, his siblings.

== Society and culture ==
Some medical geneticists question whether the term "syndrome" is appropriate for this condition because many people with this karyotype appear normal.

=== In popular culture ===
In June 1970, The XYY Man was published—the first of seven Kenneth Royce spy novels whose fictional tall, intelligent, nonviolent XYY hero was a reformed expert cat burglar recruited by British intelligence for dangerous assignments—and later adapted into a thirteen-episode British summer television series broadcast in 1976 and 1977.

In other fictional television works, a January 1971 episode "By the Pricking of My Thumbs ..." of the British science fiction TV series Doomwatch featured an XYY boy expelled from school because his genetic condition led him to be falsely accused of nearly blinding another boy. A November 1993 episode of the American police procedural TV series Law & Order, "Born Bad", portrays a 14-year-old XYY sociopathic murderer. The May 2007 season finale episode, "Born To Kill", of the American police procedural TV series CSI: Miami depicts a 34-year-old XYY serial killer.

The false stereotype of XYY boys and men as violent criminals has also been used as a plot device in the horror films Il gatto a nove code in February 1971 (dubbed into English as The Cat o' Nine Tails in May 1971) and Alien 3 in May 1992. The main character of the 2005 film Neo Ned is a neo-nazi who has an extra Y chromosome.

== See also ==
- Sex chromosome anomalies
- Klinefelter syndrome
- XXYY syndrome
- XYYY syndrome
- XXXYY syndrome
- XXYYY syndrome
- XYYYY syndrome
- Turner syndrome
- Trisomy X
