= Ankylosis =

Joint stiffness due to abnormal adhesion or rigidity of the articulating bones

- Other names: Anchylosis
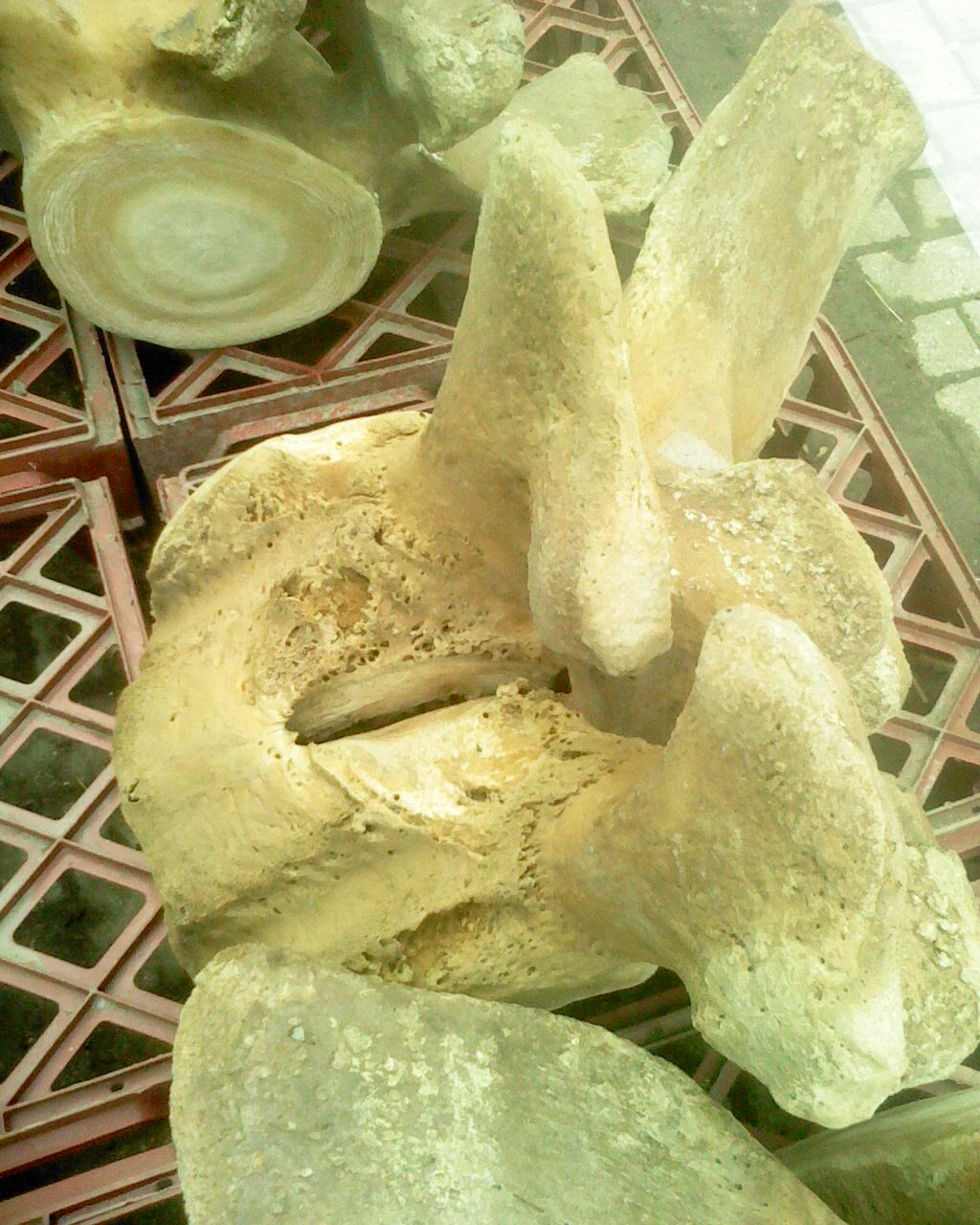
- Osseous ankylosis has fused two vertebrae of this North Atlantic right whale specimen
- Specialty: Rheumatology

Ankylosis (from Greek ἀγκύλος (ankulos) 'bent, crooked') is a stiffness of a joint due to abnormal adhesion and rigidity of the bones of the joint, which may be the result of injury or disease. The rigidity may be complete or partial and may be due to inflammation of the tendinous or muscular structures outside the joint or of the tissues of the joint itself.

When the structures outside the joint are affected, the term "false ankylosis" has been used in contradistinction to "true ankylosis", in which the disease is within the joint. When inflammation has caused the joint-ends of the bones to be fused together, the ankylosis is termed osseous or complete and is an instance of synostosis. Excision of a completely ankylotic shoulder or elbow may restore free mobility and usefulness to the limb. "Ankylosis" is also used as an anatomical term, bones being said to ankylose (or anchylose) when, from being originally distinct, they coalesce, or become so joined that no motion can take place between them.

== Causes ==
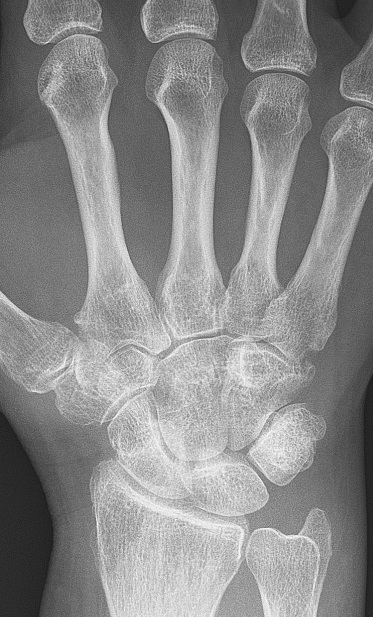
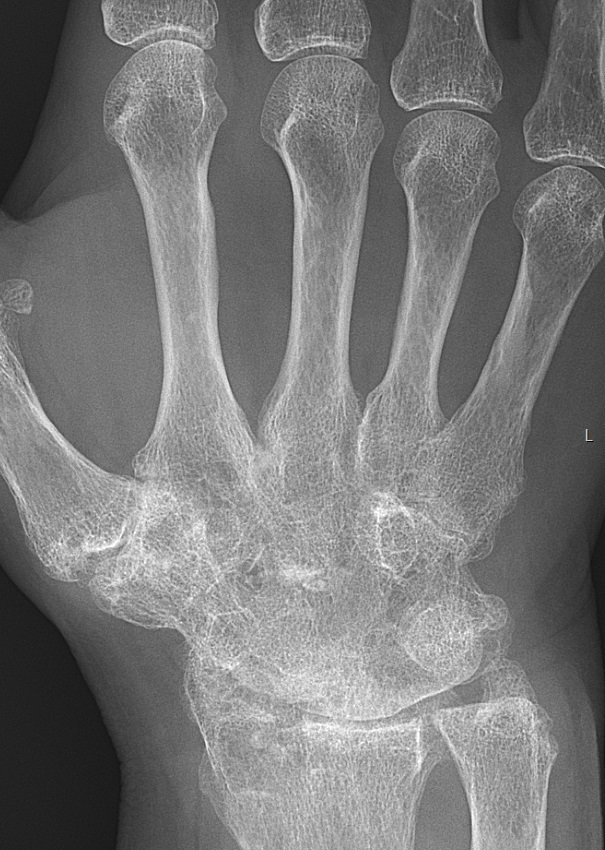
X-ray of the wrist of a woman with rheumatoid arthritis, showing unaffected carpal bones in the left image, and ankylosing fusion of the carpal bones 8 years later in the right image.
- Ankylosing spondylitis is a type of arthritis in which there is long-term inflammation of the joints of the spine.
- Other forms of arthritis may sometimes also lead to ankylosis, including rheumatoid arthritis and reactive arthritis
- Osteoarthritis usually confers osteophyte formation, which may eventually fuse across joints. Osteoarthritis is believed to be caused by mechanical stress on the joint and low-grade inflammatory processes.
- Arthrodesis is the intentional creation of ankylosis in a joint.
- Noma—a gangrenous disease still widespread among malnourished children living on the borders of the Sahara desert—can cause ankylosis of the maxilla and mandible, impairing the ability to speak and eat.
- Fibrodysplasia ossificans progressiva is a rare bone disease in which muscle, tendons and ligaments turn to bone. This leads to progressive ankylosis of almost all joints.

== Society and culture ==
=== Fossil record ===
Evidence for ankylosis found in the fossil record is studied by paleopathologists, specialists in ancient disease and injury. Ankylosis has been reported in dinosaur fossils from several species, including Allosaurus fragilis, Becklespinax altispinax, Poekilopleuron bucklandii, and Tyrannosaurus rex (including the Stan specimen).
