= XXYY syndrome =

Extra X and Y chromosome in males

- Other names: 48,XXY Y Klinefelter syndrome (archaic); 48,XXYY variant of Klinefelter's syndrome (archaic)
- XXYY syndrome
- Symptoms: see below
- Frequency: 1 in 18,000–40,000

XXYY syndrome is a sex chromosome anomaly in which males have two extra chromosomes, one X and one Y chromosome. Human cells usually contain two sex chromosomes, one from the mother and one from the father. Usually, females have two X chromosomes (XX) and males have one X and one Y chromosome (XY). The appearance of at least one Y chromosome with a properly functioning SRY gene makes a male. Therefore, humans with XXYY are genotypically male. Males with XXYY syndrome have 48 chromosomes instead of the typical 46. This is why XXYY syndrome is sometimes written as 48, XXYY syndrome or 48, XXYY. It affects an estimated one in every 18,000–40,000 male births.

== Signs and symptoms ==
Very frequent signs and symptoms of this condition include the following:

- Azoospermia
- Decreased testicular size
- Developmental delays
- Hypergonadotropic hypogonadism
- Sterility
- Intellectual impairment
- Speech impairment

Other frequent signs of this condition include the following:

- Abnormal dental enamel morphology
- Abnormal shoulder morphology
- Anxiety
- Asthma
- Attention-deficit hyperactivity disorder (ADHD) symptoms
- Autism spectrum disorders
- Blepharophimosis
- Caries
- Clinodactyly
- Constipation
- Delayed tooth eruption
- Depression
- Chronic otitis media
- Elbow dislocation
- Epicanthus
- Flat occiput
- Gynecomastia
- Hypertelorism
- Low muscle tone
- Joint hyperflexibility
- Obesity
- Open bite
- Flat feet
- Radioulnar synostosis
- Strabismus
- Tall stature
- Taurodontism
- Tremors

Other symptoms may include the following:

- Learning disabilities
- Scoliosis
- Undescended testicles
- Low testosterone

== Cause ==
48,XXYY syndrome is a condition related to the X and Y chromosomes (the sex chromosomes). People normally have 46 chromosomes in each cell. Two of the 46 chromosomes, known as X and Y, are called sex chromosomes because they help determine whether a person will develop male or female sex characteristics. Females typically have two X chromosomes (46,XX), and males have one X chromosome and one Y chromosome (46,XY). 48,XXYY syndrome results from the presence of an extra copy of both sex chromosomes in each of a male's cells (48,XXYY). Extra copies of genes on the X chromosome interfere with male sexual development, preventing the testes from functioning normally and reducing the levels of testosterone. Many genes are found only on the X or Y chromosome, but genes in areas known as the pseudoautosomal regions are present on both sex chromosomes. Extra copies of genes from the pseudoautosomal regions of the extra X and Y chromosome contribute to the signs and symptoms of 48,XXYY syndrome; however, the specific genes have not yet been identified.

== Genetics ==
The condition 48,XXYY is not inherited; it usually occurs as a random event during the formation of reproductive cells (eggs and sperm). An error in cell division called nondisjunction results in a reproductive cell with an abnormal number of chromosomes. In 48,XXYY syndrome, the extra sex chromosomes almost always comes from a sperm cell. Nondisjunction may cause a sperm cell to gain two extra sex chromosomes, resulting in a sperm cell with three sex chromosomes (one X and two Y chromosomes). If that sperm cell fertilizes a normal egg cell with one X chromosome, the resulting child will have two X chromosomes and two Y chromosomes in each of his body's cells.

In a small percentage of cases, 48,XXYY syndrome results from nondisjunction of the sex chromosomes in a 46,XY embryo very soon after fertilization has occurred. This means that a normal sperm cell with one Y chromosome fertilized a normal egg cell with one X chromosome, but right after fertilization, nondisjunction of the sex chromosomes caused the embryo to gain two extra sex chromosomes, resulting in a 48,XXYY embryo.

== Diagnosis ==
A karyotype is done to diagnose XXYY syndrome. Treatment consists of medications, behavioral therapies, and intensive community support.

== Management ==
Patients generally need to be followed by an endocrinologist. If hypogonadism is present, testosterone treatment should be considered in all individuals regardless of cognitive abilities due to positive effects on bone health, muscle strength, fatigue, and endurance, with possible mental health/behavioral benefits, as well.

Most children with XXYY have some developmental delays and learning disabilities. Therefore, these aspects should be checked and monitored: psychology (cognitive and social–emotional development), speech/language therapy, occupational therapy, and physical therapy. Consultation with a developmental pediatrician, psychiatrist, or neurologist to develop a treatment plan including therapies, behavioral interventions, educational supports, and psychotropic medications for behavioral and psychiatric symptoms should be arranged.

Common diagnoses such as learning disability/ID, ADHD, autism spectrum disorders, mood disorders, tic disorders, and other mental health problems should be considered, screened for, and treated. Good responses to standard medication treatments for inattention, impulsivity, anxiety, and mood instability are seen in this group, and such treatment can positively impact academic progress, emotional wellbeing, and long-term outcome. Poor fine-motor coordination and the development of intention tremor can make handwriting slow and laborious, and occupational therapy and keyboarding should be introduced at an early age to facilitate schoolwork and self-help skills. Educational difficulties should be evaluated with a full psychological evaluation to identify discrepancies between verbal and performance skills and to identify individual academic needs.

Expressive language skills are often affected throughout life, and speech therapy interventions targeting expressive language skills, dyspraxia, and language pragmatics may be needed into adulthood. Adaptive skills (life skills) are a significant area of weakness, necessitating community-based supports for almost all individuals in adulthood. Additional treatment recommendations based on the individual strengths and weaknesses in XXYY syndrome may be required.

== Prognosis ==
Patients have an essentially normal life expectancy, but require regular medical follow-ups.

== History ==
The first published report of a boy with a 48,XXYY karyotype was by Sylfest Muldal and Charles H. Ockey in Manchester, England in 1960. It was described in a 15-year-old mentally disabled boy who showed signs of Klinefelter syndrome; however, chromosome testing revealed 48,XXYY instead of the 47, XXY arrangement known to cause Klinefelter syndrome. Because of this, 48,XXYY syndrome was originally considered a variation of Klinefelter syndrome. Shared physical and medical features resulting from the presence of an extra X chromosome include tall stature, the development of testosterone deficiency in adolescence and/or adulthood (hypergonadotropic hypogonadism), and infertility. However, recent research shows some important differences in males with 48,XXYY compared to 47, XXY. The most important differences result from the effects of the extra X and Y chromosome on neurodevelopment, leading to higher rates of developmental delays in early childhood, learning disability or intellectual disability, adaptive functioning (life skills) difficulties, neurodevelopmental disorders such as ADHD or autism spectrum disorders, and psychological/behavioral problems including anxiety, depression, and mood dysregulation. Also, a larger percentage of males with XXYY have additional medical problems such as seizures, congenital elbow malformations (radioulnar synostosis), and tremor compared to males with XXY. XXYY is still considered a variation of Klinefelter syndrome by some definitions, mainly because the pathophysiology of the testicular dysfunction has not been shown to differ from 47, XXY, and the most current research does not suggest that there should be any differences in the evaluation and treatment of testosterone deficiency in 48,XXYY compared to 47, XXY. However, for the psychological and behavioral symptoms of XXYY syndrome, more extensive evaluations, interventions, and supports are usually needed compared to 47, XXY due to more complex neurodevelopmental involvement. Significant variability is seen between individuals in the number and severity of the medical and neurodevelopmental problems associated with XXYY, and some individuals have mild symptoms, while others are more significantly affected.

== See also ==
- Sex chromosome anomalies
- Aneuploidy
- Tetrasomy X
- Taurodontism
