= Radioulnar synostosis =

Abnormal fusion of the radius and ulna bones of the forearm

- Other names: Radioulnar fusion
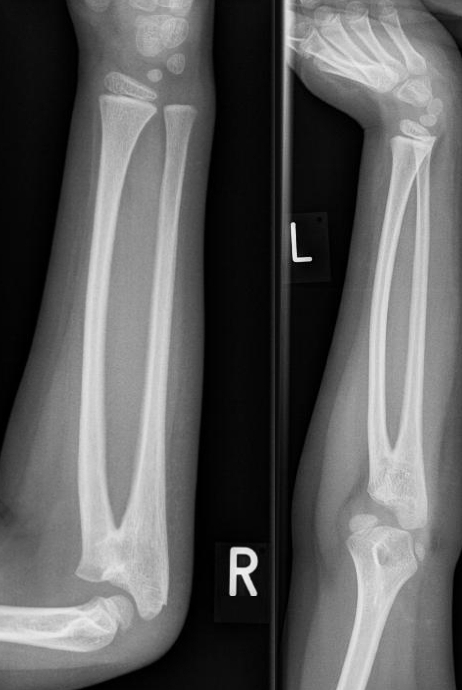
- Congenital radioulnar synostosis in a 7-year-old boy
- Specialty: Orthopaedics

Radioulnar synostosis is a rare condition where there is an abnormal connection (synostosis) between the radius and ulna bones of the forearm. This can be present at birth (congenital), when it is a result of a failure of the bones to form separately, or following an injury (post-traumatic).

It typically causes restricted movement of the forearm, in particular rotation (pronation and supination), though is usually not painful unless it causes subluxation of the radial head. It can be associated with dislocation of the radial head which leads to limited elbow extension.

== Types ==
=== Congenital ===
Congenital radioulnar synostosis is rare, with approximately 350 cases reported in journals. It typically affects both sides (bilateral) and can be associated with other skeletal problems such as hip and knee abnormalities, finger abnormalities (syndactyly or clinodactyly), or Madelung's deformity. It is sometimes part of known genetic syndromes such as Klinefelter syndrome (48,XXXY variant), Apert, Williams, Cornelia de Lange, or Holt–Oram. It has been reported to run in families typically following an autosomal dominant inheritance pattern, which means that children of an affected parent have a 50% chance of having the condition. When associated with amegakaryocytic thrombocytopenia, this inheritance has been found to be caused by mutations to the HOXA11 gene. It is also one of the known manifestations of the fetal alcohol spectrum disorder, which results from prenatal exposure to alcohol.

=== Acquired ===
Post-traumatic cases are most likely to develop following surgery for a forearm fracture; this is more common with high-energy injuries where the bones are broken into many pieces (comminuted). It can also develop following soft tissue injury to the forearm where there is haematoma formation.

== Diagnosis ==
Diagnosis at birth is best done using ultrasound technology. In younger children and adults, diagnosis is done with x-ray machine at the radioulnar bones.

== Treatment ==
It is sometimes possible to correct the problem with surgery, though this has high failure rates for treatment of post-traumatic radioulnar synostosis. Indication for the surgical treatment of congenital radioulnar synostosis include severe disability due to bilateral disorder or hyperpronation ≥ 90°.
