= Clinodactyly =

Sideways curving of a finger or toe

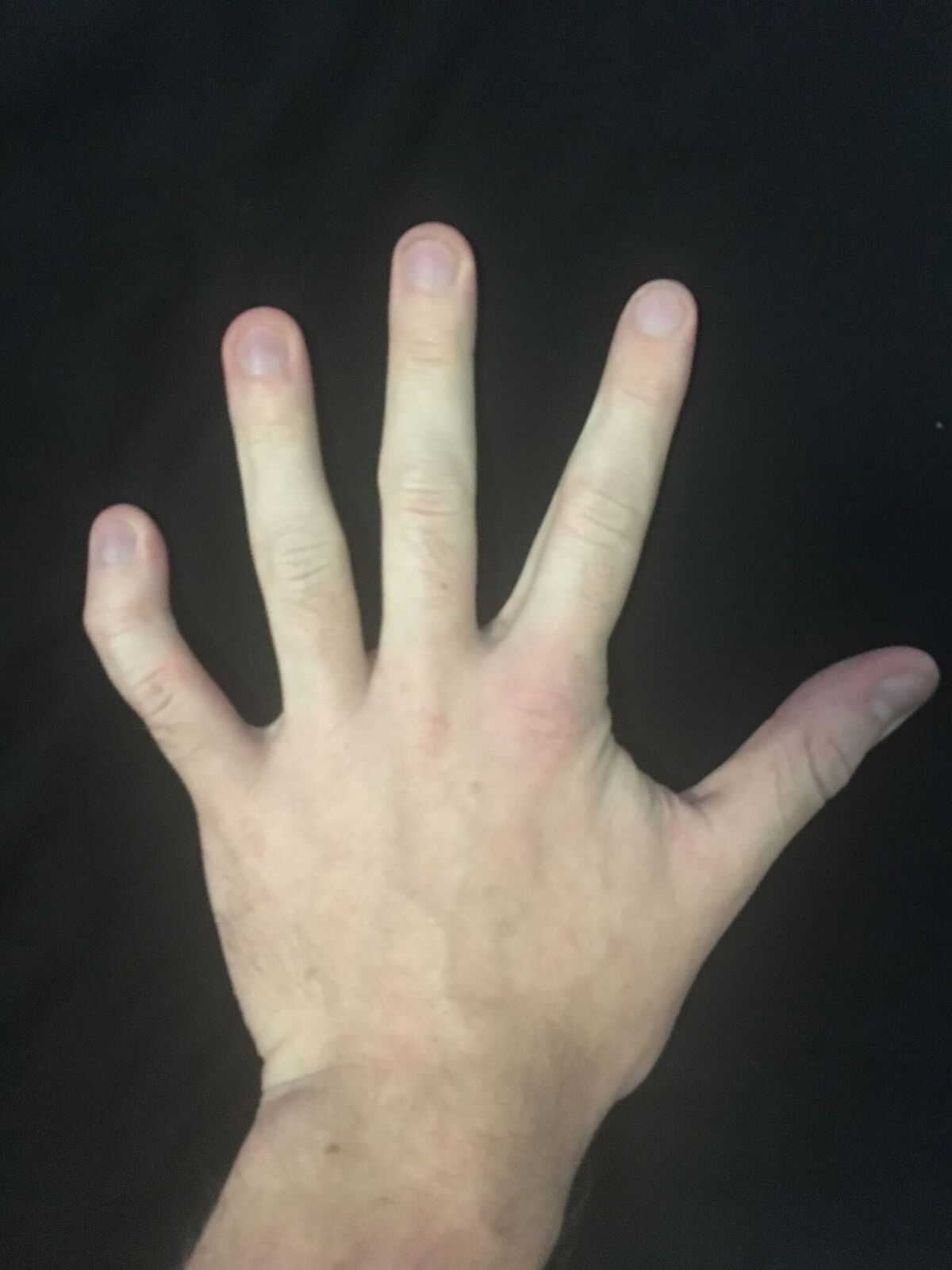
- The picture above illustrates a severe case of this condition.
- Pronunciation: /ˌklaɪnoʊˈdæktɪli/
- Specialty: Medical genetics

Clinodactyly is a medical term describing the curvature of a digit (a finger or toe) in the plane of the palm, most commonly the fifth finger (the "little finger") towards the adjacent fourth finger (the "ring finger").

It is a fairly common isolated anomaly which often goes unnoticed, but also occurs in combination with other abnormalities in certain genetic syndromes. The term comes from Ancient Greek κλίνειν (klínein) 'to bend' and δάκτυλος (dáktulos) 'digit'.

== Genetics ==
Clinodactyly is an autosomal dominant trait that has variable expressiveness and incomplete penetrance.

Clinodactyly can be passed through inheritance and presents as either an isolated anomaly or a component manifestation of a genetic syndrome. Many syndromes are associated with clinodactyly, including those listed below. But the phenotype, by itself, is not a sensitive or specific diagnostic test for these syndromes (it is present in up to 18% of the normal population).

- Down syndrome
- Turner syndrome
- Aarskog syndrome
- Carpenter syndrome
- Seckel syndrome
- Cornelia de Lange syndrome
- Orofaciodigital syndrome 1
- 13q deletion syndrome
- XXYY syndrome
- Silver–Russell syndrome
- Noonan syndrome
- Ehlers–Danlos syndrome
- Andersen–Tawil syndrome

When identified prenatally, in conjunction with other features of Down syndrome, for example during obstetric ultrasonography, it may be an indication for intrauterine sampling for fetal chromosome analysis.

== Pathophysiology ==
Due to a developmental arrest, there is an abnormal alignment of the joint surfaces at either interphalangeal joint causing angulation in the plane of the palm. The finger may be slightly bent or have a very prominent bend.

== Diagnosis ==
There is no consensus on what degree of angulation justifies a diagnosis; an incline between 15° and 30° is typical. A similar-sounding term, camptodactyly, is a fixed flexion deformity of a digit.

== Management ==
Treatment is only necessary if the degree of curvature is sufficient to cause disability or if it causes emotional distress. Splinting does not routinely correct the deformity. Surgical treatments are closing wedge osteotomy, opening wedge osteotomy, and reversed wedge osteotomy. Radiographs of the fingers are useful in planning the surgical procedure. Severe clinodactyly may require soft tissue alterations to the digit such as release of skin, extensor tendon relocation, and collateral ligament advancement.

== Epidemiology ==
Minor degrees of curvature are common. Reports of incidence vary between 1% and 19.5%.

== See also ==
- Camptodactyly
- OSLAM syndrome
