= Polysomy =

Abnormal multiples of one or more chromosomes

Human karyogram, with annotated bands and sub-bands. It is a graphical representation of the idealized human diploid karyotype. It shows dark and white regions on G banding. Each row is vertically aligned at centromere level. It shows 22 homologous autosomal chromosome pairs, both the female (XX) and male (XY) versions of the two sex chromosomes, as well as the mitochondrial genome (at bottom left).

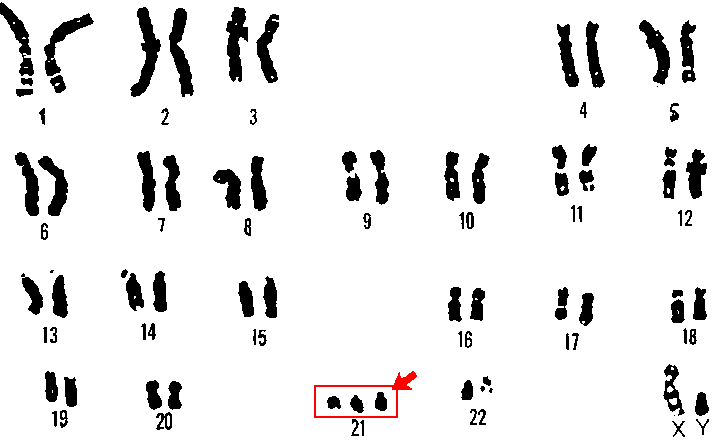
Trisomy 21 – Down syndrome, an example of a polysomy at chromosome 21

Polysomy is a condition found in many species, including fungi, plants, insects, and mammals, in which an organism has at least one more chromosome than normal, i.e., there may be three or more copies of the chromosome rather than the expected two copies. Most eukaryotic species are diploid, meaning they have two sets of chromosomes, whereas prokaryotes are haploid, containing a single chromosome in each cell. Aneuploids possess chromosome numbers that are not exact multiples of the haploid number and polysomy is a type of aneuploidy. A karyotype is the set of chromosomes in an organism and the suffix -somy is used to name aneuploid karyotypes. This is not to be confused with the suffix -ploidy, referring to the number of complete sets of chromosomes.

Polysomy is usually caused by non-disjunction (the failure of a pair of homologous chromosomes to separate) during meiosis, but may also be due to a translocation mutation (a chromosome abnormality caused by rearrangement of parts between nonhomologous chromosomes). Polysomy is found in many diseases, including Down syndrome in humans where affected individuals possess three copies (trisomy) of chromosome 21.

Polysomic inheritance occurs during meiosis when chiasmata form between more than two homologous partners, producing multivalent chromosomes. Autopolyploids may show polysomic inheritance of all the linkage groups, and their fertility may be reduced due to unbalanced chromosome numbers in the gametes. In tetrasomic inheritance, four copies of a linkage group rather than two (tetrasomy) assort two-by-two.

== Types ==
Polysomy types are categorized based on the number of extra chromosomes in each set, noted as a diploid (2n) with an extra chromosome of various numbers. For example, a polysomy with three chromosomes is called a trisomy, a polysomy with four chromosomes is called tetrasomy, etc.:

Number of chromosomes	Name	Description	Examples
3	trisomy	Three copies of a chromosome, 2n + 1	Down syndrome (Trisomy 21), Edwards syndrome (Trisomy 18), or Patau syndrome (Trisomy 13)
4	tetrasomy	Four copies of a chromosome, 2n + 2	Tetrasomy 9p, Tetrasomy 18p
5	pentasomy	Five copies of a chromosome, 2n + 3	Pentasomy X (XXXXX or 49, XXXXX)
6	hexasomy	Six copies of a chromosome, 2n + 4	Mosaic hexasomy 21 or partial hexasomy 15
7	heptasomy	Seven copies of a chromosome, 2n + 5	Heptasomy 21 in acute myeloid leukemia
8	octosomy	Eight copies of a chromosome, 2n + 6	Octosomy in sturgeon fish (Acipenser baerii, A. persicus, A. sinensis, and A. transmontanus)
9	nonasomy	Nine copies of a chromosome, 2n + 7	Nonasomy in congenital skeletal polydystrophy
10	decasomy	Ten copies of a chromosome, 2n + 8	decasomy 8 in histolytic carcinoma

== In mammals ==
=== In canines ===
Trisomy 13

Polysomy plays a role in canine leukemia, hemangiopericytomas, and thyroid tumors. Abnormalities of chromosome 13 have been observed in canine osteoid chondrosarcoma and lymphosarcoma. Trisomy 13 in dogs with lymphosarcoma show a longer duration of first remission (medicine) and survival, responding well to treatments with chemotherapeutic agents. Polysomy of chromosome 13 (Polysomy 13) is significant in the development of prostate cancer and is often caused by centric fusions. Since canine chromosome 13 is similar to human chromosome 8q, research could provide insight to treatment for prostate cancer in humans. Polysomy of chromosomes 1, 2, 4, 5, and 25 are also frequently involved in canine tumors. Chromosome 1 may contain a gene responsible for tumor development and lead to changes in the karyotype, including fusion of the centromere, or centric fusions. Aneuploidy due to nondisjunction is a common feature in tumor cells.

=== In humans ===
==== Sex chromosomes ====
Some of the most frequent genetic disorders are abnormalities of sex chromosomes, but polysomies rarely occur. 49,XXXXY chromosome polysomy occurs every 1 in 85,000 newborn males. The incidence of other X polysomies (48,XXXX, 48,XXXY, 48,XXYY) is more rare than 49,XXXXY. Polysomy Y (47,XYY; 48,XYYY; 48,XXYY; 49,XXYYY) occurs in 1 out of 975 males and may cause psychiatric, social, and somatic abnormalities. Polysomy X may cause mental and developmental retardation and physical malformation. Klinefelter syndrome is an example of human polysomy X with the karyotype 47, XXY. X chromosome polysomies can be inherited from either a single maternal (49, X polysomies) or paternal (48, X polysomies) X chromosome. Polysomy of sex chromosomes is caused by successive nondisjunctions in meiosis I and II.

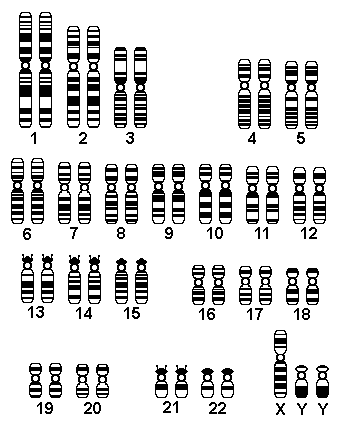
Karyotype of Polysomy Y (XYY)

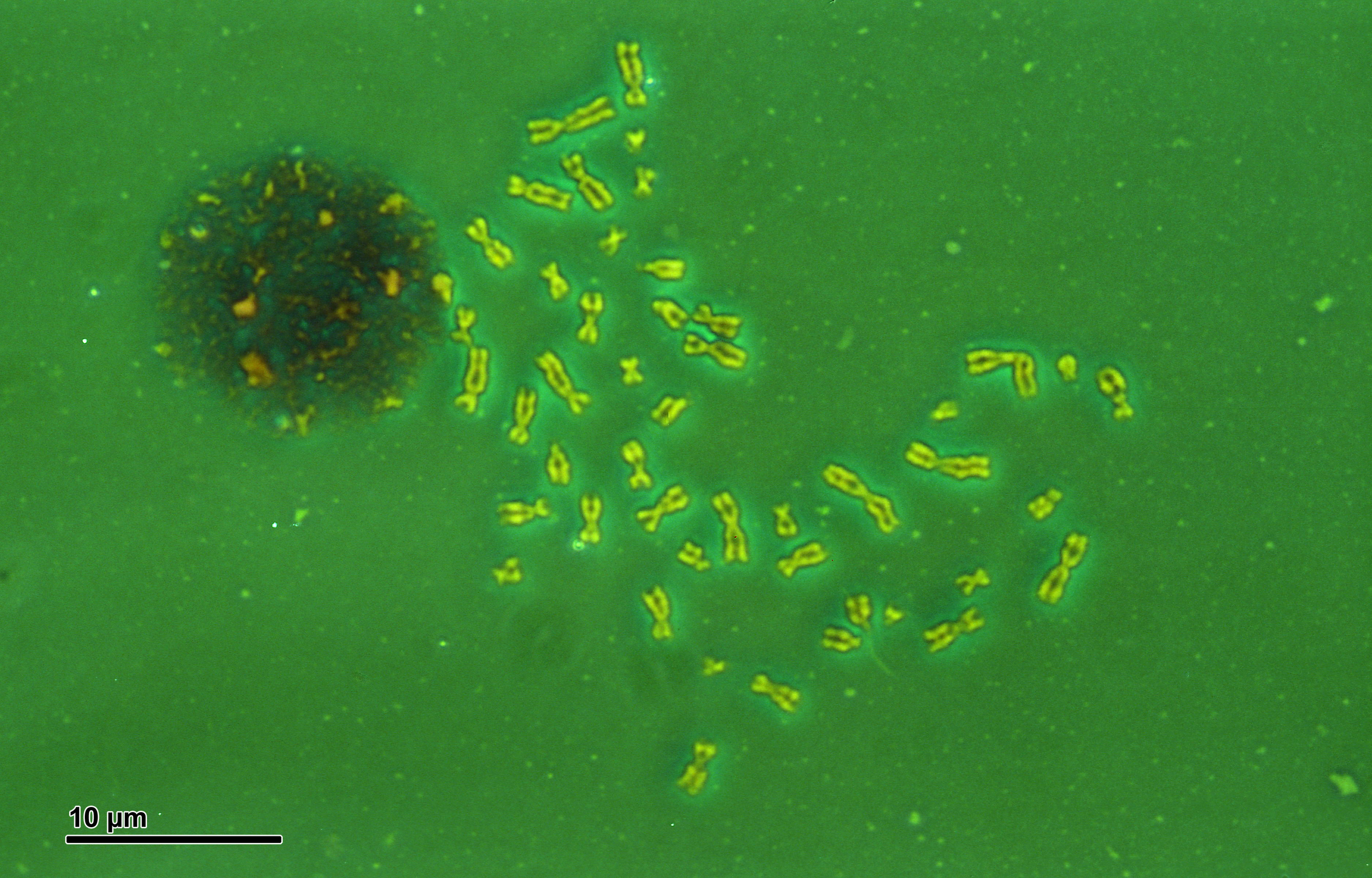
example of Polysomy X (47,XXY, Klinefelter syndrome)

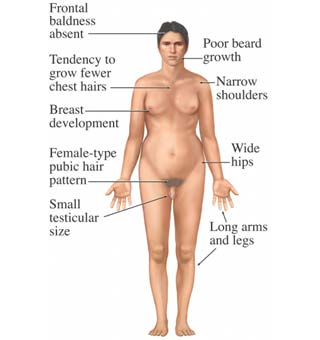
Effects of Polysomy X as seen in Klinefelter syndrome

==== Chromosome 7 ====
CFTR gene on chromosome 7

In squamous cell carcinoma, a protein from the epidermal growth factor receptor (EGFR) gene is often overexpressed in conjunction with polysomy of chromosome 7, so chromosome 7 can be used to predict the presence of EGFR in squamous cell carcinoma. In colorectal cancer, EGFR expression is decreased with polysomy 7, which makes polysomy 7 easier to detect and could be used to prevent patients from having unnecessary cancer treatment.

==== Chromosome 8 ====
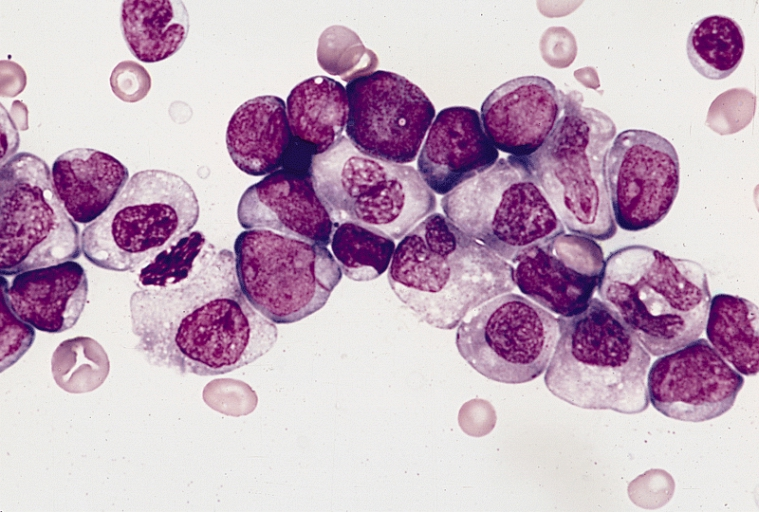
AML-M2 associated with chromosome 8 abnormality

Tetrasomy and hexasomy 8 are rare compared to trisomy 8, which is the most common karyotypic finding in acute myeloid leukemia (AML) and myelodysplastic syndromes (MDS). AML, MDS, or myeloproliferative disorder (MPD) with a high incidence of secondary diseases and a six-month survival rate are associated with a polysomy 8 syndrome.

==== Chromosome 17 ====
Overexpression of the HER2/neu gene on chromosome 17 and some type of polysomy has been reported in 8-68% of breast carcinomas. If theHER-2/neu gene does not amplify in the case of polysomy, proteins may be overexpressed and could lead to tumerogenesis. Polysomy 17 may complicate the interpretation of HER2 testing results in cancer patients. Chromosome 17 polysomy may not be present when the centromere is amplified, so it was later discovered that polysomy 17 is rare. This was discovered using array comparative genomic hybridization, a DNA-based alternative for clinical evaluation of HER2 gene copy number.

==== Trisomy 21 ====
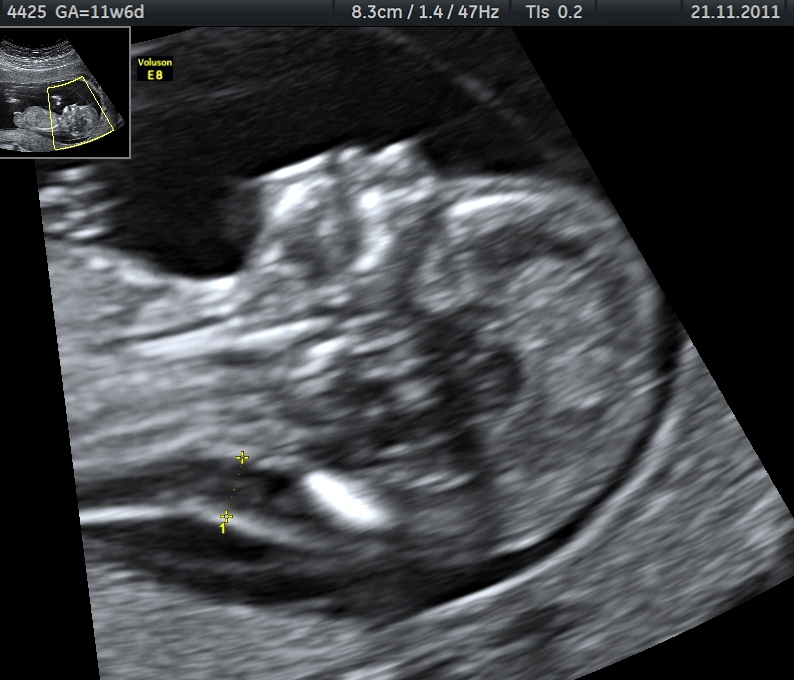
Nuchal edema in Down Syndrome Dr. W. Moroder

Trisomy 21 is a form of Down syndrome that occurs when there is an extra copy of chromosome 21. The result is a genetic condition in which a person has 47 chromosomes instead of the usual 46. During egg or sperm development the 21st chromosome does not separate during either the egg or sperm development. The result is a cell that has 24 chromosomes. This extra chromosome may cause problems with the manner in which the body and brain develop.

==== Tetrasomy 9p ====
Tetrasomy 9p is a rare condition in which people have a small extra chromosome that contains two copies of part of chromosome 9, in addition to having two normal chromosome 9's as well. This condition may be diagnosed by analyzing a person's blood sample since 9p is found in high concentrations in the blood. Ultrasound is another tool that may be utilized to identify tetrasomy 9p in infants prior to birth. Prenatal ultrasound may reveal several common characteristics including: growth restriction, ventriculomegaly, cleft lip or palate, and renal anomalies.

==== Tetrasomy 18p ====
Tetrasomy 18p occurs when the short arm of the 18th chromosome appears four times, rather than twice, in the cells of the body. It is considered to be a rare disease and usually is not inherited. The mechanism of 18p formation appears to be the result of two independent events: centromeric misdivision and nondisjunction. Characteristic features of tetrasomy 18p include, but are not limited to: growth retardation, scoliosis, abnormal brain MRI, developmental delays, and strabismus.

== In insects ==
=== Germ line polysomy in the grasshopper ===
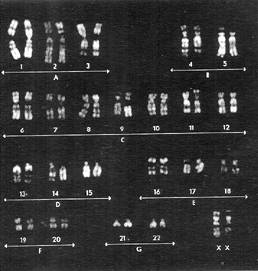
Karyotype showing chromosomes 1–22 are grouped A-G

Germ line cells develop into eggs and sperm and the associated inherited material can be passed down to future generations. As shown in the associated karyotype image, chromosomes 1–22 are grouped A-G. A population of male grasshoppers (Chorthippus binotatus) from the Sierra Nevada (Spain) are polysomic mosaics (coming from cells of two genetically different types) possessing an extra E group chromosome(chromosomes 16, 17 & 18) in their testicles. Parents that exhibited polysomy did not pass the E chromosome abnormality to any of the offspring, so this is not something that is passed down to future generations. Male grasshoppers (Atractomorpha similis) from Australia carry between one and ten extra copies of chromosome A9, with one being the most common in natural populations. Most polysomic males produce normal sperm. However, polysomy can be transmissible through both the male and female parents through nondisjunction.

=== Heterochromatic polysomy in the cricket ===
Heterochromatin contains a small number of genes and densely staining nodules in or along chromosomes. The mole cricket chromosome number varies between 19 and 23 chromosomes depending on the part of the world in which they are located, including Jerusalem, Palestine, and Europe. Heterochromic polysomy is seen in mole crickets with 23 chromosomes and may be a factor contributing to their evolution, specifically within the species Gryllotalpa gryllotalpa, along with various living environments and mating systems.

=== X-chromosome polysomy in the fruit fly ===
In the fruit fly, Drosophila, one X chromosome in the male is almost the same as two X chromosomes in the female in terms of the gene product produced. Despite this, metafemales, or females having three X chromosomes, are unlikely to survive. It is possible that the extra X chromosome decreases gene expression and could explain why the metafemales rarely survive this X-chromosome polysomy.

== In plants ==
A karyotype rearrangement of individual chromosomes takes place when polysomy in plants is observed. The mechanism of this type of rearrangement is "non-disjunction, mis-segregation in diploids or polyploids; mis-segregation from multivalents in interchange heterozygotes." Incidences of polysomy have been identified in many species of plants, including:

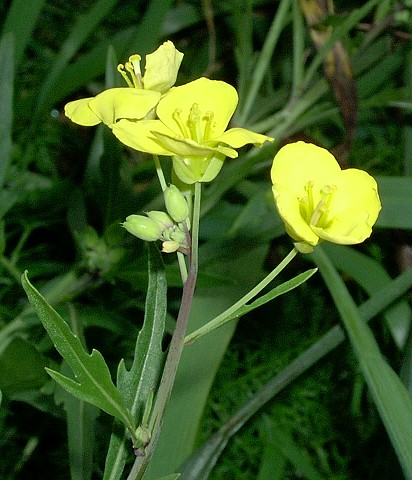
Brosen flower nn1, Brassica rapa

- Ornithogalum umbellatum L. (Liliaceae)
- Conifers
- Cultivar R570
- Brassica
- Euphrasia
- Paspalum dilatatum

== In fungi ==
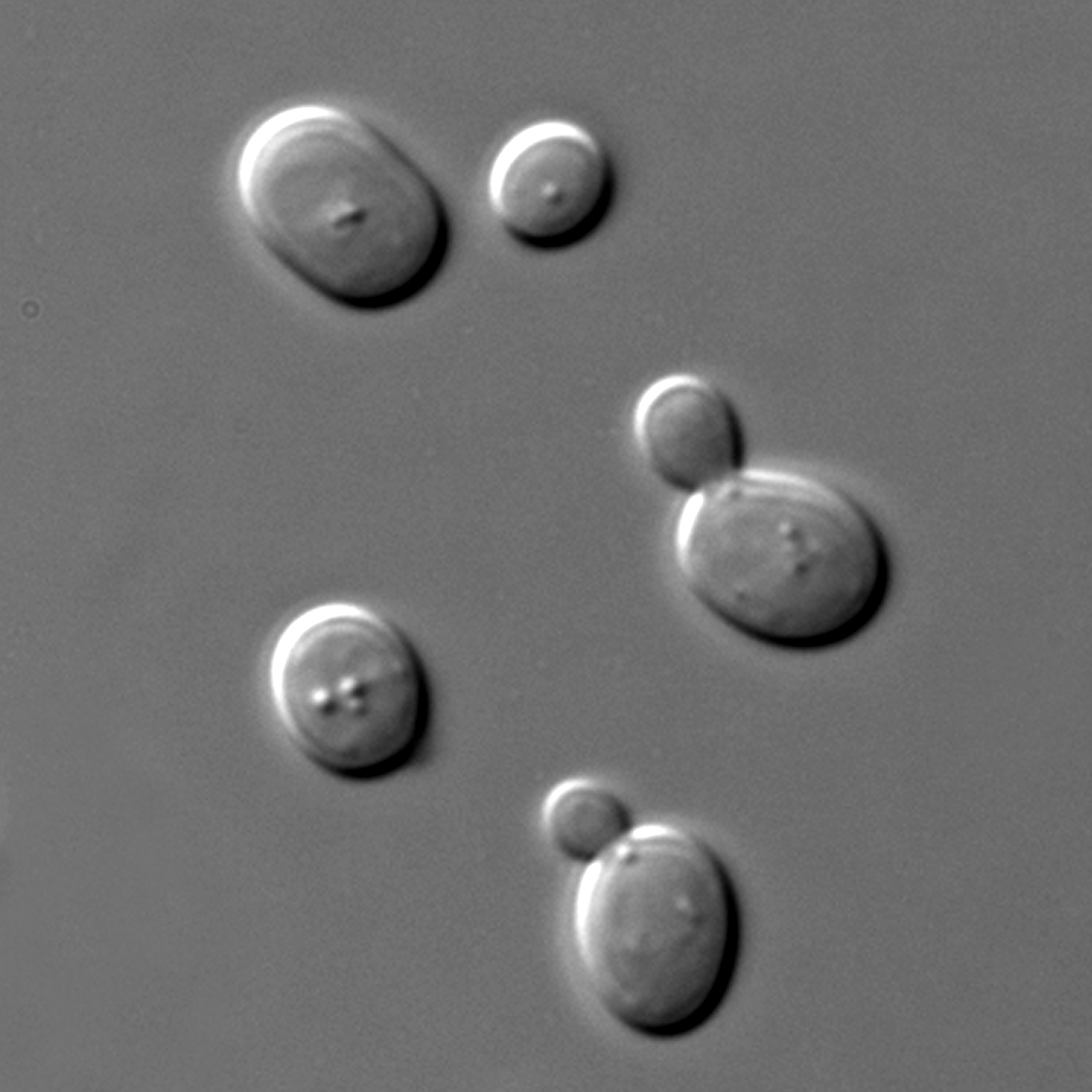
S. cerevisiae under DIC microscopy

Few fungi have been researched so far, possibly due to the low number of chromosomes in fungi, as determined by pulsed field gel electrophoresis. Polysomy of Chromosome 13 has been observed in the Flor strains of the yeast species Saccharomyces cerevisiae. Chromosome 13 contains loci, specifically the ADH2 and ADH3 loci, which encode for the isozymes of alcohol dehydrogenase. These isozymes play a primary role in the biological aging of wines via ethanol oxidative utilization. Polysomy of Chromosome 13 is promoted when there is disruption of the yeast RNA1 gene with LEU2 sequences.

== Diagnostic tools ==
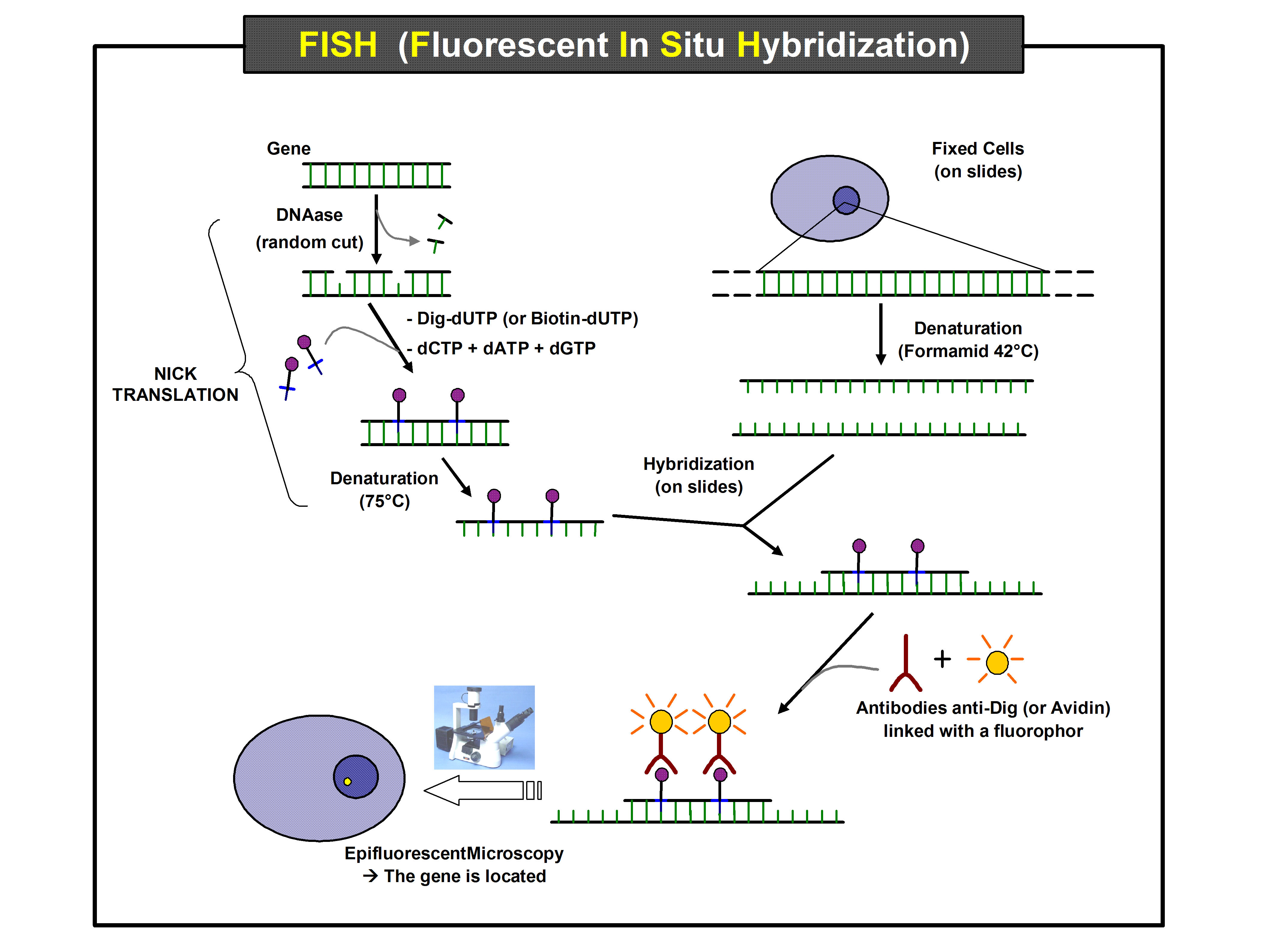
FISH (Fluorescent In Situ Hybridization)

=== Fluorescent in situ hybridization ===
Fluorescence in situ hybridization (FISH) is a cytogenetic technique that has proven to be useful in the diagnosis of patients with polysomy. Conventional cytogenetics and fluorescence in situ hybridization (FISH) have been used to detect various polysomies, including the most common autosomies (trisomy 13, 18, 21) as well as polysomy X and Y. Testing for chromosomal aneuploidy with Fluorescence in situ hybridization may increase the sensitivity of cytology and improve the accuracy of cancer diagnosis. The Cervical Cancer, TERC, Fluorescence in situ hybridization test, detects amplification of the human telomerase RNA component (TERC) gene and/or polysomy of chromosome 3.

=== Spectral karyotyping ===
Spectral karyotyping (SKY) looks at the entire karyotype by using fluorescent labels and assigning a particular color to each chromosome. SKY is usually performed after conventional cytogenic techniques have already detected an abnormal chromosome. FISH analysis is then used to confirm the identity of the chromosome.

=== Giemsa banding (G-banded karyotyping) ===
Karyotypes are commonly analyzed using Giemsa banding (G-banded karyotyping). Each chromosome shows unique light and dark bands after they are denatured with trypsin and polysomies can be detected by counting the stained chromosomes. Several cells have to be analysed to detect mosaicism.

=== Microarray analysis ===
Submicroscopic chromosomal abnormalities that are too small to be detected via other means of karyotyping, may be identified by chromosomal microarray analysis. There are several existing microarray techniques that may be utilized during the prenatal diagnosis phase, and these include SNP arrays and comparative genomic hybridization (CGH). CGH is a DNA-based diagnostic tool that has been used to detect polysomy 17 in breast cancer. CGH was first used in 1992 by Kallionemi at UC San Francisco. When used in conjunction with ultrasound findings, microarray analysis may be instrumental in the clinical diagnosis of chromosomal abnormalities.

=== Prenatal diagnostic tests ===
Prenatal and other diagnostic techniques such as immunocytochemistry (ICC) evaluation are usually followed by FISH or Polymerase Chain Reaction to detect chromosomal aneuploidies. Maternal blood sampling for fetal cells, often used to identify risk of trisomies 18 or 21, poses less risk as compared to amniocentesis and chorionic villous sampling (CVS). Chorionic villus sampling utilizes placental tissue to give information about fetal chromosome status and has been used since the 1970s. In addition to CVS, amniocentesis can be used to obtain fetal karyotype by examining fetal cells in amniotic fluid. It was first performed in 1952 and became standard practice in the 1970s. The odds of having a child with polysomy increases as the age of the mother increases, so pregnant women over the age of 35 are tested.

=== Restriction fragment length polymorphism (RFLP) analysis ===
RFLPs can be used to determine the origin and mechanism involved with Polysomy X and other chromosome heteromorphisms or chromosomes that differ in size, shape, or staining properties. Restriction enzymes cut DNA at a specific site and the DNA fragments that are left are called restriction fragment length polymorphisms, or RFLPs. RFLP also aids in the identification of the Huntingtin (HTT) gene which is predictive of an adult-onset autosomal disorder called Huntington's disease (HD). Mutations in chromosome 4 are able to be visualized when RFLP is used in conjunction with Southern blot analysis.

=== Flow cytometry ===
Human lymphocyte cultures may be analyzed by flow cytometry to assess chromosomal abnormalities, such as polyploidy, hypodiploidy, and hyperdiploidy. Flow cytometers have the ability to analyze thousands of cells each second and are commonly used to isolate specific cell populations.

== See also ==
- B chromosome
- Chromosomal duplication
- Isochromosome
- Marker chromosome
- Polyploidy
