= Small supernumerary marker chromosome =

Abnormal partial or mixed chromosome

Small supernumerary marker chromosome (sSMC)
- Other names: Small supernumerary chromosome
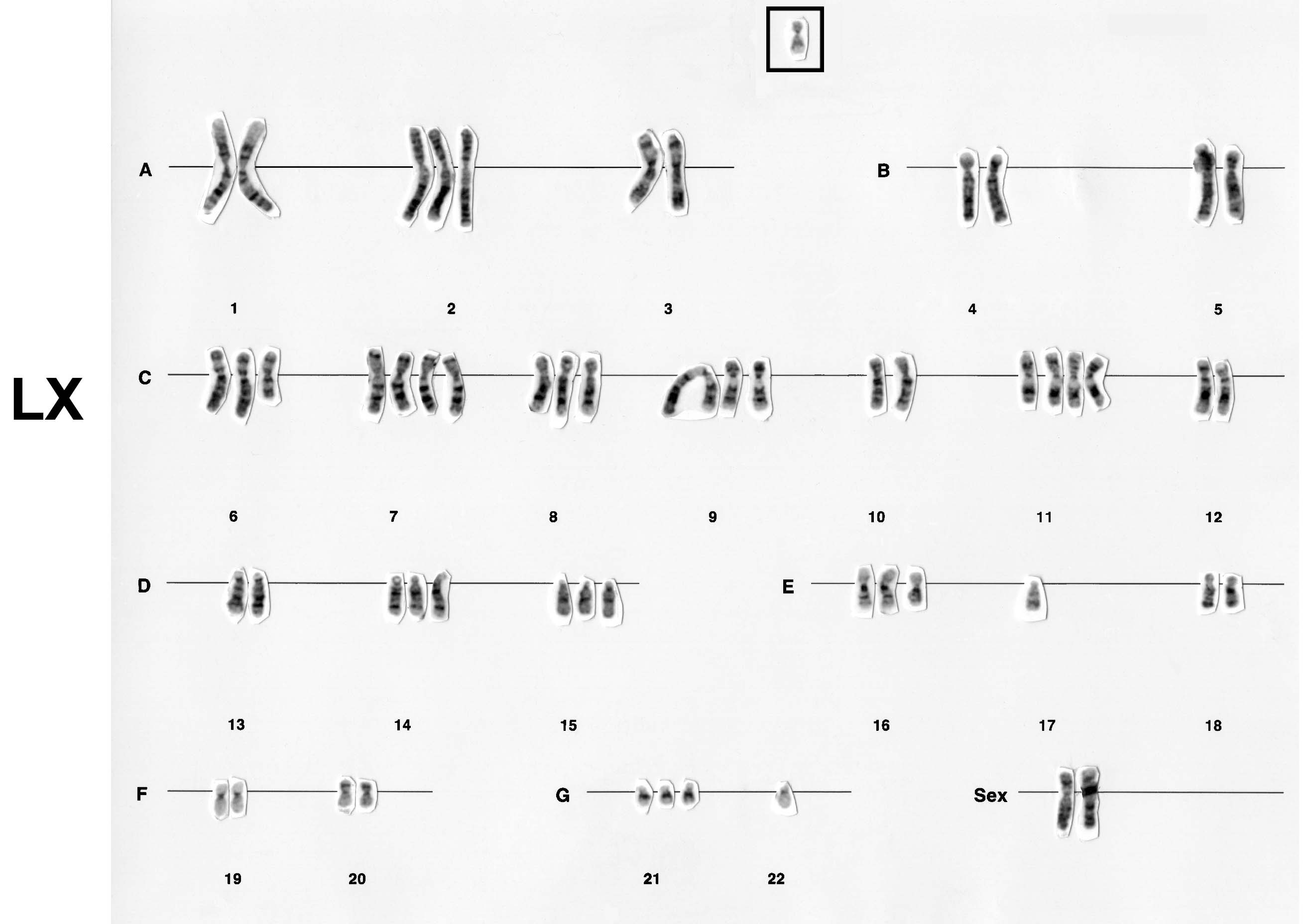
- Representative karyotype from primary passage LX tumor cell 2. Karyotypic deviation: 57XX, +2, i(6)(p10), +7, +7, +8, +9, der(9)t(9 ;12)(p13 ;q11)ins(9;?)(p13;?), +11, +11, +12, +14, +15, +16, −17, del(17)(p11.2) , +21, −22, + mar.
- Specialty: Medical genetics, pediatrics, oncology, gynecology, urology
- Complications: Development of birth defects, infertility, neoplasms
- Duration: lifetime
- Causes: Abnormal de novo formation in a parent's gametes; direct inheritance from a parent carrying an intact sSMC
- Prevention: Genetic counseling of carriers

A small supernumerary marker chromosome (sSMC) is an abnormal extra chromosome. It contains copies of parts of one or more normal chromosomes and like normal chromosomes is located in the cell's nucleus, is replicated and distributed into each daughter cell during cell division, and typically has genes which may be expressed. However, it may also be active in causing birth defects and neoplasms (e.g. tumors and cancers). The sSMC's small size makes it virtually undetectable using classical cytogenetic methods: the far larger DNA and gene content of the cell's normal chromosomes obscures those of the sSMC. Newer molecular techniques such as fluorescence in situ hybridization, next generation sequencing, comparative genomic hybridization, and highly specialized cytogenetic G banding analyses are required to study it. Using these methods, the DNA sequences and genes in sSMCs are identified and help define as well as explain any effect(s) it may have on individuals.

Human cells typically have 22 pairs of autosomal chromosomes and one pair of sex chromosomes. Each member of the paired autosomal chromosomes is identified as chromosome 1 up to 22; the pair of sex chromosomes are identified as the X and Y chromosomes with women's cells bearing two X chromosomes and men's cells bearing one X and one (male sex-determining) Y chromosome. sSMC are, by definition, smaller in size than one of the smaller human chromosomes, chromosome 20. They originate as copies of relatively small parts of one or more of the 46 chromosomes. Not all chromosomes are equally represented in sSMCs: ~65% of all sSMCs are copies of parts of chromosome 15 while only 7% are copies of parts of one of the five acrocentric chromosomes viz., chromosomes 13, 14, 15, 21, and 22 (note that the human Y chromosome can sometimes appear acrocentric, but this is usually the result of a translocation from an autosome). G banding analyses of sSMCs are commonly used to identify the chromosomes from which they were derived, the arms of these chromosomes ("p" for short arm, "q" for long arm) they contain, and the parts of the chromosome arms they have, as defined by their G band contents. A sSMC containing part of chromosome 15's q arm between G bands 11.2 and 13.1 is described as 15q11.2–q13.1. sSMC's occur in a ring or centric minute (linear with a central centromere) shape, may contain inverted repeats of its genetic material, and may be an isochromosome. Isochromosomes have either two duplicate p or two duplicate q arms rather than the one p and one q arm of normal chromosomes. Thus, cells carrying a sSMC consisting of an isochromosome fragment have 2 extra copies of the genetic material in the sSMC and are termed tetrasomic. Cells carrying sSMCs that contain a non-duplicated fragment of a chromosome have one extra copy of the genetic material and are termed trisomic.

sSMCs' genes are clearly part of a cells genotype, i.e. gene profile, but may not be activatable and therefore not alter an individual. In many cases, however, the genes in a sSMCs are active, over-expressed, and considered causes of the associated sSMC's disorder. sSMCs may form as a result of one or more of the following chromosomal events: incomplete trisomic rescue, chromothripsis-mediated partial trisomy rescue, U-type strand exchange, and/or rare types of genetic recombination. These events typically form an sSMC de novo during the meiosis divisions that form the sperm or egg cell, and subsequently the zygote (i.e. fertilized egg), which then develops into a fetus. Less commonly, however, parents may carry the sSMC and pass it to their descendants through their sperm or egg. In either case, the sSMCs may acquire further changes in their genetic material at any time during development of the zygote or thereafter.

World-wide, small supernumerary marker chromosomes occur in ~4.2 per 10,000 individuals. Among sSMC-carrying individuals, ~70% acquired the sSMC as a result of a mutation(s) occurring during formation of their parent's sperm, egg, or zygote, while 30% inherit it directly from a parent carrying the intact sSMC (20% from a mother, 10% from a father). Rare cases of sSMCs' associated with neoplasms develop in individuals as a result of acquired mutations in their genome. Some 70% of individuals with a sSMC have no abnormalities and are unaware of it or learn of it by chance; the remaining ~30% acquire abnormalities during prenatal development that may be manifest in utero, at birth, or later in life. About 74% of acquired and >98% of inherited parentally transmitted sSMC-carrying individuals are developmentally normal. The sSMC-associated abnormalities include: mild to serious syndromes recognized congenitally (i.e. at birth) or in the fetus; infertility which is commonly detected in or near adulthood; and benign or malignant tumors that develop at virtually any age. There is a wide range of characteristics and traits among individuals with the same or similar sSMC. This is due to at least three mechanisms: 1) differences in the genomic contents of the sSMCs and/or individual genomes; 2) variable changes in the genetic material of sSMCs that develop over time; and 3) genetic mosaicism, i.e. variations in the distribution of the sSMC to different tissues and organs that occur during embryonic development or thereafter.

== sSMC-associated disorders ==
There are numerous sSMC-associated disorders, most of which have been reported to occur in just a few individuals. The following sections detail some sSMC-associated disorders that are found in larger numbers of individuals, are genetically well-characterized, and/or exemplify novel aspects or impacts of particular sSMCs. Overall, these disorders are classified as: sSMC-associated syndromes that cause serious birth defects diagnosed at an early age, at birth or in a developing fetus; sSMC-associated infertility which is usually diagnosed in adults; and sSMC-related neoplasms (i.e. abnormal and excessive growth of tissues) such as benign, premalignant, and malignant neoplasms which may be diagnosed at any age.

=== sSMC-associated syndromes ===
==== Cat eye syndrome ====
The cat eye syndrome (CES), also termed the Schmid–Fraccaro syndrome, is a severe disorder in which individuals have multiple birth defects such as congenital heart abnormalities, renal malformations, craniofacial anomalies, male genital anomalies, skeletal defects, borderline to moderately severe intellectual disability, and cat-like downward-slanted openings between the upper and lower eyelids (palpebral fissures. CES is commonly associated with a tetrasomy (i.e. four gene copies, one from each normal chromosome, two from the sSMC) or, less commonly, trisomy (three gene copies, one from each normal chromosome and one from the sSMC) of the entire p arm of chromosome 22 plus a small part (i.e. G bands 1 through 11) of this chromosome's q arm. A chromosomal rearrangement mutation between the paired chromosomes 22 occurring during the miosis cell divisions that produce a parent's sperm or egg forms a CES-associated sSMCs that is passed to the parent's offspring. Rarely, CES results from a balanced translocation between a parent's paired chromosome 22. A balanced translocation is an even exchange between two chromosomes that results in no change in genetic information and generally has no detrimental effects on its carriers. However, a parent with a balanced translocation in chromosomes 22 has an increased risk of having a child with CES; this is due to a chromosomal rearrangement mutation between the balanced chromosomes 22 that forms a sSMC-associated sSMC in the parent's sperm or egg and is passed to the parent's offspring. Finally, in extremely rare cases a parent may carry a CES-associated sSMC in only some of their cells due to mosaicism, have little of no CES defects, and directly transmit this sSMC through their sperm or eggs to their offspring. A CES-associated sSMC may be small, large, or ring-shaped and typically includes 2 Mb, i.e. 2 million DNA base pairs, termed the CES critical region, located on its q arm at bands 11.1 through ll.23. This area contains the CECR1, SLC22A18, and ATP6V1E1 genes which are strong candidate genes for causing or promoting at least some of the birth defects in CES.

==== Marker chromosome 15 syndrome ====
Marker chromosome 15 syndrome, also called Isodicentric 15, idic(15), partial tetrasomy 15q, or inverted duplication 15 (inv dup 15), is a moderate to severe congenital disorder that includes early-life weakness and hypotonia of the central (but not limb) muscles, delays in normal development, intellectual disability, autistic behavior, epilepsy, stomach/intestinal disorders, and/or brain abnormalities. The syndrome is associated with a sSMC that contains either: a) an inverted duplication of the Prader–Willi Syndrome/Angelman Syndrome critical region (PWS/ASCR) located between bands 11 and 13 on the q arm of chromosome 15 (notated as 15q11-q13); or b) an area on the q arm of chromosome 15 around band 11 (notated as 15q11) outside of the PWS/ASCR (the cytogenic description of this sSMC is dic (15)(q11)). Individuals with 15q11-q13 and 15q11-containing sSMC's have sometimes been diagnosed as having the isodicentric (15) syndrome or inv dup (15) syndrome, respectively. Currently, the two syndromes are regarded as types of marker chromosome 15 syndromes that appear to have somewhat different clinical manifestations. Certain duplicated genes in the PWS/ACR viz., NDN, SNRPN, UBE3A, and GABRB3, are suspected of contributing to one or more of the disorders in this syndrome. The chromosome 15q11-q13 duplication syndrome (also termed "Dup15q") is associated with birth defects similar to those of marker chromosome 15 syndrome. It is caused by a duplication of bands q11 through q13 on chromosome 15 which, like the sSMC in most cases of the marker chromosome 15 syndrome, includes PWS/ASCR and the genes just cited. Further studies are needed to define the roles of the cited genes, if any, in the birth defects associated with the Marker 15 chromosome and/or chromosome 15q11-q13 duplication syndromes. Future studies may also determine that isodicentric (15) syndrome and inv dup (15) syndrome are different disorders.

==== Tetrasomy 15qter syndrome ====
Tetrasomy 15qter syndrome is an extremely rare congenital syndrome which is associated with intellectual disability, overgrowth of the body or body part, skull bossing, short palpebral fissures, long philtrum, low-set ears, high-arched palate, retrognathia (i.e., abnormal posterior positioning of the maxilla or mandible), joint contractions, arachnodactyly, and/or, less commonly, kidney, genitourinary and various vascular and cardiac anomalies. The syndrome is caused by an sSMC bearing two copies (that are inverted duplications) of the genetic material on the q arm of chromosome 15 beginning at various sites between bands 23 and 26 and running to this arms terminus; this area is notated as (15) q24–qter. Individuals with this syndrome therefore have 4 copies of the genetic material that is in the sSMC, i.e. 2 from each normal chromosome and 2 from the sSMC. Centromeres are specialized DNA sequences of a chromosome that are required to link each sister chromatid of paired chromosomes and thereby to distribute each member of the paired chromosome to different daughter cells during mitosis and meiosis cell divisions. The sSMCs in tetrasomy 15qter do not have a normal centromere; rather, they have a neocentromere, i.e. a new, novel centromere that forms at a place on the chromosome that is usually not the site where the centromere of the copied chromosome (in this case chromosome 15) is located. Neocentromeric sSMCs of any type are associated with adverse outcomes in 90% of cases. The exact genetic material in this sSMC that contributes to the development of the cited birth defects has not been determined.

==== Emanuel syndrome ====
Emanuel syndrome (ES), also known as supernumerary der(22)t(11;22) syndrome, is characterized by multiple birth defects including craniofacial dysmorphic features, delayed development, intellectual disability, ear anomalies, cleft or high-arched palate, micrognathia (i.e. undersized jaw), microcephaly (i.e. shorter-than-normal head), kidney abnormalities, heart defects, and, in males, genital abnormalities. ES is associated with a sSMC containing genetic material from a derivative chromosome carried by one parent. A derivative chromosome contains a balanced translocation, i.e. an even exchange between two chromosomes that results in no increase or decrease in genetic information and generally has no detrimental effects on its carriers. This derivative chromosome contains an exchange, termed t(11;22), or der22 (22) t (11;22), between the q arm of chromosome 22 around band 11.2 and the q arm of chromosome 11 around band 21. In ~10% of cases, carriers of this chromosome have a child with ES, with male and female carriers having 0.7% and 3.4%, respectively, chances of parenting such a child. The afflicted children of these parents have an ES-producing sSMC containing only part of their parents derivative chromosome. This sSMC is termed derivative 22, der(22) or der(22)t(11;22); the afflicted individuals' karyotypes (i.e. chromosome tallies) are 47,XX,+der(22)t(11;22) for females and 47,XY,+der(22)t(11;22) for males. The sSMC in ES forms as a result of a nondisjunction, i.e. failure, of the parent's derivative chromosome to separate from its homolog, i.e. paired, chromosome properly during the meiotic cell divisions that form their sperms or eggs. The genetic material in sSMC der(22)t(11;22) that produces the defects in ES has not been established.

==== Der(22)t(8;22)(q24.1;q11.1) syndrome ====
Der(22)t(8;22)(q24.1;q11.1) syndrome, also termed the supernumerary der(22)t(8;22) syndrome, is a syndrome in which individuals are born with normal birth weight and growth but have moderate intellectual disability; dysmorphic features in the face and head areas; prominent, low-set, underdeveloped ear canals, and/or preauricular pits (small holes or cysts in front and above the ear canal); clinodactyly (abnormal curvature of one or more fingers and/or toes); and ectopic testis (testes in unusual locations) or cryptorchidism (undescended testes). This syndrome is associated with a sSMC derived from an abnormal chromosome carried by a parent. This chromosome contains a balanced translocation between the q arm around band 24.13 of chromosome 8 and the q arm around band 11.1 of chromosome 22. Carriers of it are at risk of having progeny with the Der(22)t(8;22)(q24.1;q11.1) syndrome because they acquired a sSMC that has alteration(s) in the parent's abnormal chromosome. This alteration occurs in the parent's egg or sperm as a result of an nondisjunction of the parent's paired t(8;22)chromosomes during the meiosis cell divisions that form the sperm or egg. The genetic material in this sSMC that causes this syndrome's defects has not been established.

==== Tetrasomy 9p ====
Tetrasomy 9p (also termed 9p isochromosome) is associated with a wide range of birth defects including intrauterine growth retardation; facial dysmorphism; cleft lip and/or palate; malformations of the limbs and skeleton; and/or abnormalities of the central nervous system, heart, and/or genitourinary tract. The sSMC in tetrasomy 9 cases is an isochromosome of one of 3 compositions: a) two p arms of chromosome 9 which are mirror images of each other; b) this chromosome's two p arms plus a small part of its q arm from bands 12 to 13; or c) this chromosomes two p arms plus a part of its q arm from bands 21 to 22. All three of these sSMC variant types contain two copies of the p arm genetic material that they contain and therefore render cells tetrasomeic, i.e. possessing 4 copies, of some of this arm's genetic material. However, there is a trisomy 9p-related congenital disorder which has only 3 copies of this genetic material due an abnormal chromosome 12 containing duplicate copies rather than a single copy of some genetic material. These individuals have trisomy 9p; they have birth defects similar to, but less severe than, those in tetrasomy 9p. The genetic material in tetrasomy 9 and trisomy 9p that causes the birth defects is not known. Findings that a) 7 adult cases of tetrasomy 9p were essentially normal and b) many of the genetically detailed cases of tetrasomy 9p have other chromosome abnormalities suggest that the role of the cited sSMCs in tetrasomy 9p requires further study.

==== Isochromosome i (5p) ====
Isochromosome i (5p) (also termed tetrasomy 5p) is a congenital disorder associated with a wide range of birth defects the most common of which are: developmental delay, hypotonia, short stature, seizures, congenital heart defects, ventriculomegaly (enlargement of the brain's lateral ventricles), shortened survival in the uterus or after birth, psychomotor retardation, facial disfigurements, and/or feeding and/or breathing difficulties. Most cases of isochromosome i 5p are diagnosed in individuals aged 0 to 5 years or, in a few cases, in the uterus. A 2018 review of 15 postnatal cases that had genetic analyses found 4 were associated with amplifications due to mutations in chromosome 5's p arm and 8 were associated with sSMCs consisting of two partial copies of this arm. All 12 individuals had 2 extra copies of large areas in the p arm. However, the exact genetic material on the p arm contributing to the disorder were not established. Individuals with only one extra partial copy of th 5p arm, i.e. who were trisomic, have similar but perhaps less severe defects than those with tetrasomy i (5p). There are large variations in the types of defects shown in individuals with isochromosome i (5P) sSMC due, at least in part, to genetic mosaicism, i.e. differences in the tissue and organ distribution of this sSMC.

==== Isochromosome 18p syndrome ====
Isochromosome 18p syndrome, also termed tetrasomy 18p, is a birth disorder associated with microcephaly (shorter than normal head), small kidneys, cryptorchidism, micropenis, hypospadias (i.e. the penis's urethral opening is mis-located), strabismus, feeding difficulties, neonatal jaundice, kyphosis (excessive convex curvature of the spine), scoliosis (sideways curve of the spine), recurrent otitis media, hearing loss, constipation, feeding problems, dysmorphic features, and/or moderately severe intellectual disability. The sSMc in this syndrome is composed of two extra copies of the short arm of chromosome 18 developed in most cases during formation of a parent's egg or sperm or in the fertilized zygote although rare inherited cases of the intact sSMC have been reported. The specific genetic material on isochromosome 18p sSMC contributing to the development of the syndrome has generally not been assigned. However, a recent report on one individual with the syndrome revealed a sSMC of at least 15 Mb extending from band 11.21 to ll.32 on the p arm of chromosome 18.

Recently, identical female twins, i.e. twins with essentially identical copies of their parent's chromosomes, were studied because one twin clearly had the isochromosome 18p syndrome while the other appeared completely normal. Genetic analysis found evidence for the presence of isochromosome 18p's sSMC in almost all or all the cells isolated from the inner cheek, hair follicles, and skin fibroblasts of the afflicted twin while the normal twin had ≤5% of the cells in these samples positive for this sSMC. Neither parent showed evidence of having the sSMC. Thus, the normal twin appeared to have an extreme form of mosaicism in which the sSMC was present in too few tissue cells to cause the birth defects associated with the isochromosome 15p syndrome. Extreme levels of sSMC mosaicism in this and possibly other sSMC-associated disorders can be well tolerated, not associated with birth defects, and more common than currently considered.

==== Pallister–Killian syndrome ====
Pallister–Killian syndrome (PKS) is a congenital disorder that includes an extremely wide range of birth defects. The most common of these are facial dysmorphism, pigmentary skin anomalies, profound intellectual disability, hypotonia, and/or seizures; some of its less common defects include deafness, extra breast nipples, congenital diaphragmatic hernias, and/or focal areas of absent skin. PKS is commonly caused by an sSMC that is an isochromosome consisting of two p arms of chromosome 12 but in less common cases four p arms of this chromosome. Recent studies in two individuals with PKS found the sSMC consisted of two small duplications from band 11 to the terminus of the p arm on chromosome 12. This area, termed the PKS critical region, contains three genes, ING4, CHD4, and MFAP5 (also termed the MAGP2 gene), one or more of which is a candidate causer of the syndrome.

==== Turner syndrome ====
Turner syndrome is a condition in which females typically have only one X chromosome and either no Y or only part of a Y chromosome. These individuals exhibit a wide range of relatively mild to moderately severe birth defects including in all cases short stature; in most cases ovarian failure and infertility; and in less common cases bone anomalies, lymphoedema, deafness, and/or cardiovascular, thyroid and gastrointestinal disorders. A small percentage of Turner syndrome individuals have sSMCs that contain parts of the genetic material from an X or, much less frequently, Y chromosome. These sSMCs may or may not contain an XIST gene. In normal females, the XIST gene occurs on the X chromosome inherited from her mother but not on the X chromosome inherited from her father. The gene is not present on Y chromosomes and in normal females resides on and functions to inactivate many of the genes located on its own maternal but not the father's X chromosome. Turner syndrome females with an sSMC consisting of a partial X chromosome that does not contain the XIST gene express at least some of this sSMC's genetic material and therefore contain excesses of this material. In consequence, they have a more serious form of the Turner syndrome that ranges form moderately severe to extremely severe. The extremely severe cases have anencephaly (absence of a major portion of the brain, skull, and scalp), agenesis of the corpus callosum (lack of the thick tract of nerve fibers that connect the left and right cerebral hemispheres), and complex heart deformities. Individuals with Turner syndrome that have partial X chromosome containing-sSMCs that have the XIST gene do not express this sSMC's genetic material and do not suffer the cited severer manifestations of the syndrome.

=== sSMC-associated infertility ===
Infertility as used here occurs in individuals who have no other overt birth defects. As such, it is diagnosed three times more often in individuals possessing sSMCs and occurs in 0.125% of all infertility cases. Infertile men cannot impregnate, have abnormally low rates of impregnation, and/or impregnate their partner but their impregnations have abnormally high rates of spontaneous abortion. A review published in 2015 reported that the sSMC's in infertile men contain parts of any chromosome except chromosomes 10, 19, and X, with chromosomes 15, 14, 22, and 13/21 (i.e. a complex sSMC consisting of parts of chromosomes 13 and 21) being the most common. Clinically, these men have either azoospermia (i.e. absence of sperm), oligozoospermia (i.e. abnormally low sperm counts), or aoligoasthenoteratozoospermia (i.e. all three of the following, oligozoospermia, teratozoospermia [i.e. presence of sperm with abnormal shapes], and asthenozoospermia [i.e. sperm with reduced motility]). Infertility associated with a sSMC in women is ~7.5-fold less common than in men but, like men, their sSMC's consist of almost any chromosome but particularly chromosomes 15, 14, 22, and 13/21. Clinically, women with sSMC-associated infertility have a history of amenorrhea and/or primary ovarian insufficiency, i.e. premature menopause or symptoms related to premenopausal events such as partial or total losses of estrogens, progesterone, androstenedione, activin, and/or inhibin production by the ovaries before age 40. While only a small percentage of the chromosome areas involved in infertility due to sSMC's have been defined, those that have include: (15)q11.1, associated with premature ovarian failure; (13)q11.2, associated with oligoasthenoteratozoospermia; (14)q11.1, associated with infertility; and (22)q11, associated with repeated abortions. The specific genetic material producing infertility in these sSMCs has, in general, not been clearly defined.

=== sSMC-associated neoplasms ===
==== Atypical lipomatous tumors ====
Atypical lipomatous tumors (ALTs) are a type of well-differentiated liposarcoma. The term ALT is often applied to tumors located in surgically accessible locations such as the skin, oral cavity, or eye socket whereas the term well-differentiated liposarcomas is applied to tumors in less surgically accessible, deep, and centrally located, soft tissues such as the retroperitoneum. Here, the two terms are used interchangeably. Unlike less well-differentiated liposarcomas which are malignant, ALTs, while sometimes locally invasive and recurring after surgical removal, do not metastasize and rarely progress to less differentiated and potentially metastasizing forms. They are therefore commonly regarded as benign or premalignant tumors. The neoplastic cells in ALT contain one or more ring-shaped sSMCs or one giant marker chromosome (i.e. a chromosome enlarged by having a duplication of parts of its own or one or more other chromosomes) that contain extra copies of chromosome 12's q arm at bands 13 through 15. This stretch of chromosome 12 includes the MDM2 proto-oncogene (a potentially tumor-causing gene) located at band 15 and CDK4 (a gene associated with the development of various tumors) located at band 14.1. The presence of these two genes is a highly sensitive and specific indicator that a lipomatous tumor is an ALT rather than another type of lipomatous tumor. The sSMCs and giant marker chromosomes involved in ALT may contain sequences from other chromosomes; furthermore, the ring sSMCs frequently break, reseal, transform into a rod-shape, and develop gains and/or losses in their genetic material. These factors may help promote the survival and growth of the sSMC-bearing neoplastic cells in ATMs. As a result of these complicating factors, the specific genetic material in the sSCMs and giant marker chromosomes responsible for the development of ALTs have not been established.

==== Osteosarcomas ====
Low grade osteosarcomas (LGO), including low grade central and parosteal osteosarcomas, are far less malignant than most other types of osteosarcoma bone tumors. The tumor cells in LGO contain either supernumerary ring sSMCs or giant rod-shaped marker chromosomes (also termed giant rod chromosomes or RGMs). RGMs are supernumerary (i.e. extra) chromosomes that are larger than chromosome 20 and therefore here regarded too large to be classified as sSMCs. The sSMCs and RGMs in LGO contain a part of the q arm of chromosome 12 that includes its band 13 through band 15 (notated as 12q13–15). Several genes amplified in the neoplastic cells of various other types of cancer are in and thereby may be amplified in the LGO-associated sSMC and giant rod chromosomes. These genes include MDM2, CDK4, FRS2, HMGA2, YEATS4 (YEATS4 is YEATS domain containing 4), and CPM. The MDM2, CDK4, and FRS2 genes are amplified in 67% to 100% of all LGO cases and are suspected of contributing to the development and/or progression of LGOs. However, both the sSMCs and RGMs in LGO commonly contain parts of various other chromosomes, may be multiple, and often undergo changes in their genetic material during cell divisions. Consequently, the specific genetic material responsible for the formation and development of LGO has been difficult to define.

==== Gonadal tumors in the Turner syndrome ====
Most individuals with Turner syndrome have one X and no Y chromosome. However, about 5.5% of Turner syndrome individuals have an sSMC containing part of a Y chromosome. This partial Y chromosome-bearing sSMC may include the SRY gene located on the p arm of the Y chromosome at band 11.2 (notated as Yp11.2). This gene encodes the testis-determining factor protein (also known as sex-determining region Y protein). Turner syndrome individuals with this SRY gene-containing sSMC have an increased incidence of developing gonadal tissue neoplasms such as gonadoblastomas and in situ seminomas (also termed dysgerminoma to indicate that this tumor has the pathology of the testicular tumor, seminoma, but develops in ovaries). Otherwise, these individual have typical features of the Turner syndrome except for a minority who also have hirsutism and/or clitoral enlargement. Surgical removal of the gonads has been recommended to remove the threat of developing these sSMC-associated neoplasms. Turner syndrome individuals with sSMCs that lacks the SRY gene are not at an increased risk of developing these cancers.

==== Isochromosome i (5p)(p10)-associated cancers ====
A sSMC containing isochromosome i (5p)(p10) (see above section on the isochcromosome 18p syndrome) has been documented to be present in the malignant cells of certain types of cancer. Its presence in these cells is not due to inheritance but rather to cancer-related mutations in the bearer's genome. sSMC i(5)(p10) is the single most common recurrent structural chromosomal abnormality in transitional cell carcinomas of the urinary bladder, being present in the malignant cells of most cases of this disease. Transitional cell bladder carcinomas associated with this sSMS are more aggressive and invasive than those not associated with it. sSMC i(5)(p10), often in two or more copies, is also found in the malignant cervical cancer cells of individuals as well as in the oldest and most commonly studied immortalised cell line, HeLa cells. These cells were isolated from the cervix tumor of Henrietta Lacks, a 31-year-old African-American who died of her cancer in 1951. sSMC i (5)(p10) is also detected in rare cases of ovarian cancer and very rare cases of breast cancers. The mechanism(s) by which these sSMCs promote the development and/or progression of these cancer types is unclear.

== See also ==
- Marker chromosome
