= Tetrasomy (disambiguation) =

Articles on Tetrasomy include:

- Tetrasomy
- Tetrasomy 9p
- Tetrasomy 18p
- Tetrasomy 18p Canada
