= Supernumerary chromosome =

Supernumerary chromosome could refer to:

- B chromosome in some animals and plants
- Small supernumerary marker chromosome (sSMC) in humans
