= Melanoma-associated leukoderma =

- Specialty: Dermatology

Melanoma-associated leukoderma is a cutaneous condition, and is a vitiligo-like depigmentation that can occur in patients with cutaneous or ocular melanoma.

== See also ==
- Pallister–Killian syndrome
- List of cutaneous conditions
