= Fryns syndrome =

- Other names: Diaphragmatic hernia-abnormal face-distal limb anomalies syndrome
- Fryns syndrome is inherited in an autoosomal recessive manner.
- Specialty: Medical genetics
- Differential diagnosis: Simpson-Golabi-Behmel syndrome

Fryns syndrome is an autosomal recessive multiple congenital anomaly syndrome that is usually lethal in the neonatal period. Fryns (1987) reviewed the syndrome.

== Presentation ==
Usually associated with diaphragmatic hernia, pulmonary hypoplasia, imperforate anus, micropenis, bilateral cryptorchidism, cerebral ventricular dilation, camptodactyly, agenesis of sacrum, low-set ear.

== Cytogenetics ==
In a newborn boy thought to have Fryns syndrome, Clark and Fenner-Gonzales (1989) found mosaicism for a tandem duplication of 1q24-q31.2. They suggested that the gene for this disorder is located in that region. However, de Jong et al. (1989), Krassikoff and Sekhon (1990), and Dean et al. (1991) found possible Fryns syndrome associated with anomalies of chromosome 15, chromosome 6, chromosome 8 and chromosome 22, respectively. Thus, these cases may all represent mimics of the mendelian syndrome and have no significance as to the location of the gene for the recessive disorder.

By array CGH, Slavotinek et al. (2005) screened patients with DIH and additional phenotypic anomalies consistent with Fryns syndrome for cryptic chromosomal aberrations. They identified submicroscopic chromosome deletions in 3 probands who had previously been diagnosed with Fryns syndrome and had normal karyotyping with G-banded chromosome analysis. Two female infants were found to have microdeletions involving 15q26.2 (see 142340), and 1 male infant had a deletion in band 8p23.1 (see 222400).

== Diagnosis ==
Prenatal Diagnosis:

- Aymé, et al. (1989) reported prenatal diagnosis of Fryns syndrome by sonography between 24 and 27 weeks.
- Manouvrier-Hanu et al. (1996) described the prenatal diagnosis of Fryns syndrome by ultrasonographic detection of diaphragmatic hernia and cystic hygroma. The diagnosis was confirmed after termination of the pregnancy. The fetus also had 2 erupted incisors; natal teeth had not been mentioned in other cases of Fryns syndrome.

Differential Diagnosis:

- McPherson et al. (1993) noted the phenotypic overlap between Fryns syndrome and the Pallister–Killian syndrome (601803), which is a dysmorphic syndrome with tissue-specific mosaicism of tetrasomy 12p.
- Veldman et al. (2002) discussed the differentiation between Fryns syndrome and Pallister–Killian syndrome, noting that differentiation is important to genetic counseling because Fryns syndrome is an autosomal recessive disorder and Pallister–Killian syndrome is usually a sporadic chromosomal aberration. However, discrimination may be difficult due to the phenotypic similarity. In fact, in some infants with 'coarse face,' acral hypoplasia, and internal anomalies, the initial diagnosis of Fryns syndrome had to be changed because mosaicism of isochromosome 12p was detected in fibroblast cultures or kidney tissue. Although congenital diaphragmatic hernia is a common finding in both syndromes, bilateral congenital diaphragmatic hernia had been reported only in patients with Fryns syndrome until the report of the patient with Pallister–Killian syndrome by Veldman et al. (2002).
- Slavotinek (2004) reviewed the phenotypes of 52 reported cases of Fryns syndrome and reevaluated the diagnostic guidelines. She concluded that congenital diaphragmatic hernia and distal limb hypoplasia are strongly suggestive of Fryns syndrome, with other diagnostically relevant findings including pulmonary hypoplasia, craniofacial dysmorphism, polyhydramnios, and orofacial clefting. Slavotinek (2004) stated that other distinctive anomalies not mentioned in previous guidelines include ventricular dilatation or hydrocephalus, agenesis of the corpus callosum, abnormalities of the aorta, dilatation of the ureters, proximal thumbs, and broad clavicles.

== Epidemiology ==
In France, Aymé, et al. (1989) estimated the prevalence of Fryns syndrome to be 0.7 per 10,000 births based on the diagnosis of 6 cases in a series of 112,276 consecutive births (live births and perinatal deaths).

== Cases ==
- Fryns et al. (1979) reported 2 stillborn sisters with a multiple congenital anomaly syndrome characterized by coarse facies with cloudy corneae, diaphragmatic defects, absence of lung lobulation, and distal limb deformities. A sporadic case was reported by Goddeeris et al. (1980). Fitch (1988) claimed that she and her colleagues were the first to describe this disorder. In 1978 they reported a single infant, born of second-cousin parents, who had absent left hemidiaphragm, hydrocephalus, arhinencephaly, and cardiovascular anomalies.
- Lubinsky et al. (1983) reported a brother and sister with Fryns syndrome who both died in the neonatal period. Facial anomalies included broad nasal bridge, microretrognathia, abnormal helices, and cleft palate. Other features included distal digital hypoplasia, lung hypoplasia, and urogenital abnormalities, including shawl scrotum, uterus bicornis, and renal cysts. They were discordant for diaphragmatic hernia, cleft lip, and Dandy–Walker anomaly.
- Meinecke and Fryns (1985) reported an affected child; consanguinity of the parents supported recessive inheritance. They noted that a diaphragmatic defect had been described in 4 of the 5 reported cases and lung hypoplasia in all. Young et al. (1986) reported a sixth case. The male infant survived for 12 days. These authors listed corneal clouding, camptodactyly with hypoplastic nails, and abnormalities of the diaphragm as cardinal features.
- Samueloff et al. (1987) described a family in which all 4 children had Fryns syndrome and neonatal mortality. Features included hypoplastic lungs, cleft palate, retrognathia, micrognathism, small thorax, diaphragmatic hernia, distal limb hypoplasia, and early onset of polyhydramnios with premature delivery. Schwyzer et al. (1987) described an affected infant whose parents were second cousins.
- Moerman et al. (1988) described infant brother and sister with the syndrome of diaphragmatic hernia, abnormal face, and distal limb anomalies. Both died shortly after birth with severe respiratory distress. Ultrasonography demonstrated fetal hydrops, diaphragmatic hernia, and striking dilatation of the cerebral ventricles in both infants. Post-mortem examination showed Dandy–Walker malformation, ventricular septal defect, and renal cystic dysplasia.
- Cunniff et al. (1990) described affected brothers and 3 other cases, bringing the total reported cases of Fryns syndrome to 25. One of the affected brothers was still alive at the age of 24 months. Bilateral diaphragmatic hernias had been repaired on the first day of life. He required extracorporeal membrane oxygenation therapy for 5 days and oscillatory therapy for 3 months. Ventriculoperitoneal shunt was required because of slowly progressive hydrocephalus. Scoliosis was associated with extranumerary vertebral bodies and 13 ribs. Because of delayed gastric emptying, a gastrostomy tube was inserted. In addition, because of persistent chylothorax, he underwent decortication of the right lung and oversewing of the thoracic duct.
- Kershisnik et al. (1991) suggested that osteochondrodysplasia is a feature of Fryns syndrome.
- Willems et al. (1991) suggested that a diaphragmatic hernia is not a necessary feature of Fryns syndrome. They described a child with all the usual features except for diaphragmatic hernia; the diaphragm was reduced to a fibrous web with little muscular component. Bartsch et al. (1995) presented 2 unrelated cases with a typical picture of Fryns syndrome but without diaphragmatic hernia. One of these patients was alive at the age of 14 months, but had severe intellectual disability. Bamforth et al. (1987) and Hanssen et al. (1992) also described patients with this syndrome who survived the neonatal period. In the report of Hanssen et al. (1992), 2 older siblings had died in utero. The reports suggested that survival beyond the neonatal period is possible when the diaphragmatic defect and lung hypoplasia are not present. Nevertheless, intellectual disability has been present in all surviving patients.
- Vargas et al. (2000) reported a pair of monozygotic twins with Fryns syndrome discordant for severity of diaphragmatic defect. Both twins had macrocephaly, coarse facial appearance, hypoplasia of distal phalanges, and an extra pair of ribs. Twin A lacked an apparent diaphragmatic defect, and at 1 year of age had mild developmental delay. Twin B had a left congenital diaphragmatic hernia and died neonatally. The authors suggested that absence of diaphragmatic defect in Fryns syndrome may represent a subpopulation of more mildly affected patients.
- Aymé, et al. (1989) described 8 cases of Fryns syndrome in France. The most frequent anomalies were diaphragmatic defects, lung hypoplasia, cleft lip and palate, cardiac defects, including septal defects and aortic arch anomalies, renal cysts, urinary tract malformations, and distal limb hypoplasia. Most patients also had hypoplastic external genitalia and anomalies of internal genitalia, including bifid or hypoplastic uterus or immature testes. The digestive tract was also often abnormal; duodenal atresia, pyloric hyperplasia, malrotation and common mesentery were present in about half of the patients. When the brain was examined, more than half were found to have Dandy–Walker anomaly and/or agenesis of the corpus callosum. A few patients demonstrated cloudy cornea. Histologically, 2 of 3 patients showed retinal dysplasia with rosettes and gliosis of the retina, thickness of the posterior capsule of the lens, and irregularities of Bowman layer.
- Alessandri et al. (2005) reported a newborn from the Comores Islands with clinical features of Fryns syndrome without diaphragmatic hernia. They noted that diaphragmatic hernia is found in more than 80% of cases and that at least 13 other cases had been reported with an intact diaphragm.
- In a postneonatal survivor of Fryns syndrome, Riela et al. (1995) described myoclonus appearing shortly after birth, which was well controlled on valproate. Progressive cerebral and brainstem atrophy was noted on serial MRIs made at 3 months and after 6 months of age.
- Van Hove et al. (1995) described a boy with Fryns syndrome who survived to age 3 years and reviewed the outcome of other reported survivors (approximately 14% of reported cases). Survivors tended to have less frequent diaphragmatic hernia, milder lung hypoplasia, absence of complex cardiac malformation, and severe neurologic impairment. Their patient had malformations of gyration and sulcation, particularly around the central sulcus, and hypoplastic optic tracts beyond the optic chiasm associated with profound intellectual disability.
- Fryns and Moerman (1998) reported a second-trimester male fetus with Fryns syndrome and midline scalp defects. The authors stated that the finding of a scalp defect in Fryns syndrome confirms that it is a true malformation syndrome with major involvement of the midline structures.
- Ramsing et al. (2000) described 2 sibships with 4 fetuses and 1 preterm baby of 31 weeks' gestation affected by a multiple congenital disorder suggestive of Fryns syndrome. In addition to the diaphragmatic defects and distal limb anomalies, they presented with fetal hydrops, cystic hygroma, and multiple pterygias. Two affected fetuses in 1 family showed severe craniofacial abnormalities with bilateral cleft lip and palate and cardiovascular malformation.
- Arnold et al. (2003) reported a male fetus with Fryns syndrome and additional abnormalities, in particular, multiple midline developmental defects including gastroschisis, central nervous system defects with left arrhinencephaly and cerebellar hypoplasia, midline cleft of the upper lip, alveolar ridge, and maxillary bone, and cleft nose with bilateral choanal atresia.
- Pierson et al. (2004) reviewed 77 reported patients with Fryns syndrome and summarized the abnormal eye findings identified in 12 of them. They also described 3 new patients with Fryns syndrome, 1 of whom demonstrated unilateral microphthalmia and cloudy cornea.
- Slavotinek et al. (2005) noted that Fryns syndrome may be the most common autosomal recessive syndrome in which congenital diaphragmatic hernia (see DIH2, 222400) is a cardinal feature. The autosomal recessive inheritance in Fryns syndrome contrasts with the sporadic inheritance for most patients with DIH.
