= Emanuel syndrome =

- Other names: derivative 22 syndrome, der(22) syndrome
- Chromosome 11 (left) and 22 (right) are both involved in causing the syndrome, due to extra genetic material.

Emanuel syndrome, also known as derivative 22 syndrome, or der(22) syndrome, is a rare disorder associated with multiple congenital anomalies, including profound intellectual disability, preauricular skin tags or pits, and conotruncal heart defects. It can occur in offspring of carriers of the constitutional chromosomal translocation t(11;22)(q23;q11), owing to a 3:1 meiotic malsegregation event resulting in partial trisomy of chromosomes 11 and 22. An unbalanced translocation between chromosomes 11 and 22 is described as Emanuel syndrome. It was first described in 1980 by American medical researchers Beverly S. Emanuel and Elaine H. Zackai, and a consortium of European scientists the same year.

== Sign and symptoms ==
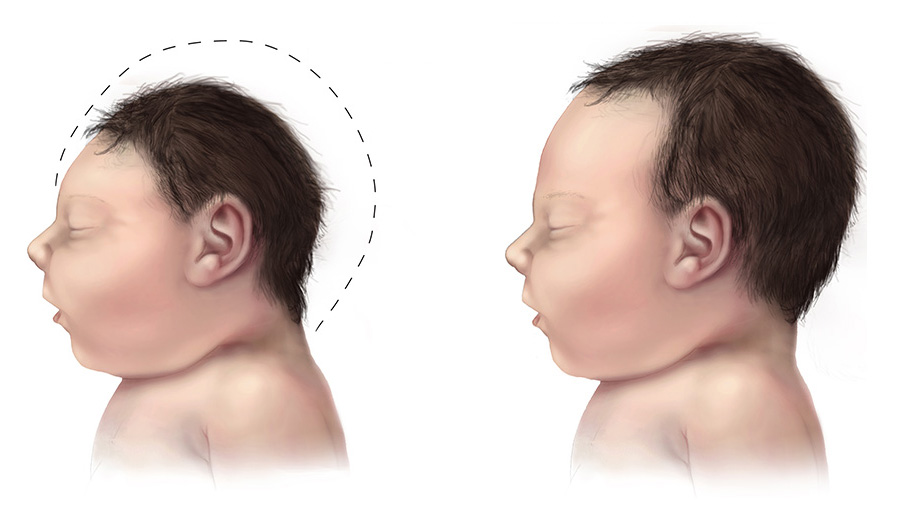
Microcephaly

Infants with Emanuel syndrome have weak muscle tone (hypotonia) and fail to gain weight and grow at the expected rate (failure to thrive). Their development is significantly delayed, and most affected individuals have severe to profound intellectual disability. Other features of Emanuel syndrome include an unusually small head (microcephaly), distinctive facial features, and a small lower jaw (micrognathia). Ear abnormalities are common, including small holes in the skin just in front of the ears (preauricular pits, or sinuses). The external auricle of the ear is typically malformed, with possibly severe microtia with atresia of the external auditory canal present. Deafness may occur, but severe hearing loss is uncommon; the occurrence of mild forms of hearing loss may be underestimated due to difficulties associated with accurately evaluating hearing in individuals with intellectual disabilities. About half of all affected infants are born with an opening in the roof of the mouth (cleft palate) or a high arched palate. Males with Emanuel syndrome often have genital abnormalities. Additional signs of this condition can include heart defects and absent or unusually small (hypoplastic) kidneys; these problems can be life-threatening in infancy or childhood.

== Causes ==
Emanuel syndrome is an inherited chromosome abnormality. It is caused by the presence of extra genetic material from chromosome 11 and chromosome 22 in each cell. In addition to the usual 46 chromosomes, people with Emanuel syndrome have an extra (supernumerary) chromosome consisting of a piece of chromosome 11 attached to a piece of chromosome 22. The extra chromosome is known as a derivative 22, or der(22), chromosome.

== Genetics ==
People with Emanuel syndrome typically inherit the der(22) chromosome from an unaffected parent. The parent carries a chromosomal rearrangement between chromosomes 11 and 22 called a balanced translocation. No genetic material is gained or lost in a balanced translocation, so these chromosomal changes usually do not cause any health problems. As this translocation is passed to the next generation, it can become unbalanced. Individuals with Emanuel syndrome inherit an unbalanced translocation between chromosomes 11 and 22 in the form of a der(22) chromosome. (This der(22) chromosome is classified as one of the small supernumerary marker chromosomes.) These individuals have two normal copies of chromosome 11, two normal copies of chromosome 22 and extra genetic material from the der(22) chromosome. As a result of the extra chromosome, people with Emanuel syndrome have three copies of some genes in each cell instead of the usual two copies. The excess genetic material disrupts the normal course of development, leading to intellectual disability and birth defects. Researchers are working to determine which genes are included on the der(22) chromosome and what role these genes play in development.

== Diagnosis ==
Emanuel syndrome can be diagnosed with a karyotype, fluorescence in situ hybridization or a chromosomal microarray analysis.

== Treatment ==
Emanuel syndrome has no known cure, but individual symptoms may be treated. Assessments of individual systems, such as the cardiovascular, gastrointestinal, orthopedic, and neurological, may be necessary to determine the extent of impairment and options for treatment.

== See also ==
- The small supernumerary marker chromosome in the Emanuel syndrome
