= Marker chromosome =

Abnormal small fragment of a chromosome

A marker chromosome (mar) is a small fragment of a chromosome which generally cannot be identified without specialized genomic analysis due to the size of the fragment. The significance of a marker is variable as it depends on what material is contained within the marker. The large majority of these marker chromosomes are smaller than one of the smaller human chromosomes, chromosome 20, and by definition are termed small supernumerary marker chromosomes.

Marker chromosomes occur sporadically about 70% of the time, with the remainder being inherited from a parent. About 50% of cases involve mosaicism, which affects the severity of the condition. The frequency is approximately 3-4 per 10,000 people, and 1 in 300 people with intellectual disability.

Marker chromosomes typically occur in addition to the standard 46 chromosomes, making it a partial trisomy or tetrasomy supernumerary chromosome. A marker can be composed of inactive genetic material and have little or no effect, or it can carry active genes and cause genetic conditions such as iso(12p), which is associated with Pallister-Killian syndrome, and iso(18p), which is associated with intellectual disability and syndromic facies. Chromosome 15 has been observed to contribute to a high number of marker chromosomes, but the reason has not been determined. The small supernumerary marker chromosome (sSMC) page contains examples of other birth defects, syndromes, and tumors that are associated with various types of sSMCs.
