= Tetrasomy =

- Specialty: Medical genetics
- Duration: Lifelong

A tetrasomy is a form of aneuploidy with the presence of four copies, instead of the normal two, of a particular chromosome.

== Causes ==
=== Full ===
Full tetrasomy of an individual occurs due to non-disjunction when the cells are dividing (meiosis I or II) to form egg and sperm cells (gametogenesis). This can result in extra chromosomes in a sperm or egg cell. After fertilization, the resulting fetus has 48 chromosomes instead of the typical 46.

=== Autosomal tetrasomies ===
- Cat eye syndrome where partial tetrasomy of chromosome 22 is present
- Pallister-Killian syndrome (tetrasomy 12p)
- Tetrasomy 9p
- Tetrasomy 18p
- Tetrasomy 21, a rare form of Down syndrome

=== Sex-chromosome tetrasomies ===
- Tetrasomy X
- XXYY syndrome
- XXXY syndrome
