= B chromosome =

Type of chromosome

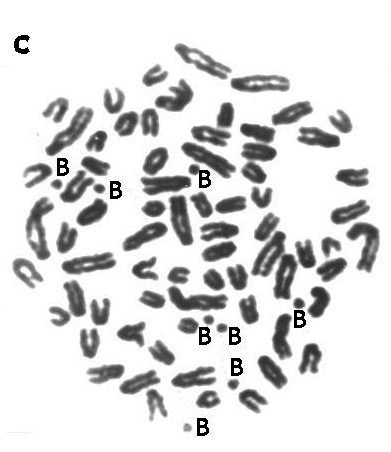
Siberian roe deer metaphase spread with B chromosomes

In addition to the normal karyotype made up of A chromosomes, wild populations of many animal, plant, and fungi species contain B chromosomes (also known as supernumerary, accessory, (conditionally-)dispensable, or lineage-specific chromosomes; also dispensomes). By definition, these chromosomes are not essential for the life of a species, and are lacking in some (usually most) of the individuals. Thus a population would consist of individuals with 0, 1, 2, 3 (etc.) B chromosomes. B chromosomes are distinct from marker chromosomes or additional copies of normal chromosomes as they occur in trisomies.

== Origin ==
The evolutionary origin of supernumerary chromosomes is obscure, but presumably, they must have been derived from heterochromatic segments of normal chromosomes in the remote past. In general "we may regard supernumeraries as a very special category of genetic polymorphism which, because of manifold types of accumulation mechanisms, does not obey the ordinary Mendelian laws of inheritance."

Next generation sequencing has shown that the B chromosomes from rye are amalgamations of the rye A ("normal") chromosomes. Similarly, B chromosomes of the cichlid fish Haplochromis latifasciatus also have been shown to arise from rearrangements of normal A chromosomes.

Fungal B chromosomes in at least two species appear to have a different origin as they show limited synteny and other similarity measures to A chromosome segments. They have likely originated by horizontal gene transfer.

== Function ==
Most B chromosomes are mainly or entirely heterochromatic (i.e. largely non-coding), but some contain sizeable euchromatic segments (e.g. such as the B chromosomes of maize). In some cases, B chromosomes act as selfish genetic elements. In other cases, B chromosomes provide some positive adaptive advantage. For instance, the British grasshopper Myrmeleotettix maculatus has two structural types of B chromosomes: metacentrics and submetacentric. The supernumeraries, which have a satellite DNA, occur in warm, dry environments, and are scarce or absent in humid, cooler localities.

There is evidence of deleterious effects of supernumeraries on pollen fertility, and favourable effects or associations with particular habitats are also known in a number of species.

B chromosomes have a tendency to accumulate in meiotic cell products resulting in an increase of B number over generations, thereby acting as selfish genetic elements. However, this effect is counterbalanced for selection against infertility.

== In fungi ==
Chromosome polymorphisms are very common among fungi. Different isolates of the same species often have a different chromosome number, with some of these additional chromosomes being unnecessary for normal growth in culture. The extra chromosomes are known as conditionally dispensable, or supernumerary, because they are dispensable for certain situations, but may confer a selective advantage under different environments.

Supernumerary chromosomes do not carry genes that are necessary for basic fungal growth but may have some functional significance. For example, it has been discovered that the supernumerary chromosome of the pea pathogen Fusarium solani (syn. Haematonectria haematococca) carries genes that are important to the disease-causing capacity of the fungus. This supernumerary DNA was found to code for a group of enzymes that metabolize toxins, known as phytoalexins, that are secreted by the plant's immune system. It is possible that these supernumerary elements originated in horizontal gene transfer events because sequence analysis often indicates that they have a different evolutionary history from essential chromosomal DNA.

The wheat-infecting fungal pathogen Zymoseptoria tritici contains 8 dispensable B chromosomes, which is the largest number of dispensable chromosomes observed in fungi, and 13 normal chromosomes. Genome sequencing reveals that the B chromosomes are higher in repeat content and lower in gene content than the essential set. Comparison suggests that the B chromosomes did not arise from segmental duplication of A chromosomes and are likely to have come from horizontal gene transfer. These chromosomes are occasionally lost during hybridization of divergent strains.

== In plants ==
B chromosomes are a significant reflection of genetic diversity between varying plant species. These supernumerary chromosomes are commonly observed in angiosperms, specifically the flowering plants bred through outcrossing.

The obscure development of B chromosomes is supported by the irregularity of their appearances in specific species populations. The number of B chromosomes copied between cells within individual members of a plant population fluctuates. For example, the sister species Aegilops speltoides and Aegilops mutica possess copies of B chromosomes within their aerial tissues, while their roots exhibit an absence of these supernumerary chromosomes.

The morphological structure and size of B chromosomes is different from normally-occurring chromosomes in both plants and mammals. Most often in plants, B chromosomes are notably "non-homologous and smaller than the smallest A-chromosome".
