= Maria Teschler-Nicola =

Austrian human biologist, anthropologist and ethnologist

- Born: 24 October 1950 (age 76); Eggenburg
- Education: University of Vienna
- Known for: Teschler-Nicola syndrome
- Awards: Silbernes Ehrenzeichen für Verdienste um das Land Wien
- Scientific career
- Fields: human biologist, anthropologist and ethnologist
- Workplaces: University of Vienna, Museum of Natural History of Vienna

Maria Teschler-Nicola (born Eggenburg, 24 October 1950) is an Austrian human biologist, anthropologist and ethnologist. The Pallister–Killian syndrome is also called Teschler-Nicola syndrome after her.

== Biography ==
Teschler-Nicola took her Matura exams in 1970, and studied human biology, medicine and folkloristics at the University of Vienna from 1971 to 1976, and graduated with a Ph.D. degree in human biology. From 1970 to 1972 she worked as a research fellow in the Institute for Forensic Medicine at the University of Vienna, and afterwards until 1976 as contractual assistant professor at the Institute of Human Biology of the University of Vienna. In 1993 she got the Venia Legendi for human biology. In 1997 she acted as interim department director, and since 1998 she has been director of the Department of Archaeological Biology and Anthropology of the Museum of Natural History of Vienna. In 2000, she was appointed as extraordinary university professor by the Austrian president Thomas Klestil.

== Awards ==
- "Silbernes Ehrenzeichen für Verdienste um das Land Wien" (Silver Order of Merit for Service to the federal state Vienna)
- In 2014 she became a member of the German Academy of Sciences Leopoldina.
