= Tetrasomy 9p =

Presence of four copies of the short arm of chromosome 9

- Other names: Isochromosome 9p
- Chromosome 9, the chromosome involved in this condition

Tetrasomy 9p (also known tetrasomy 9p syndrome) is a rare chromosomal disorder characterized by the presence of two extra copies of the short arm of chromosome 9 (called the p arm), in addition to the usual two. Symptoms of tetrasomy 9p vary widely among affected individuals but typically include varying degrees of delayed growth, abnormal facial features and intellectual disability. Symptoms of the disorder are comparable to those of trisomy 9p.

== Symptoms and signs ==
The symptoms and prognosis of tetrasomy 9p are highly variable. The severity of the symptoms is largely determined by the size of the isochromosome, the specific regions of chromosome 9p that are duplicated, as well as the number and type of tissues that are affected in the mosaic form.

Most patients exhibit some degree of intellectual disability, abnormal skeletal and muscular development, and abnormal facial structures. Cognitive symptoms range from slight learning disabilities to severe deficits in intellectual functioning. Due to abnormal development of the muscles, individuals often experience limited or delayed mobility. Atypical facial features are characteristic of the syndrome, including widely spaced eyes, a large nose, and unusually positioned ears. Additionally, patients often have extra skin around the neck and widely spaced nipples. A wide range of renal, digestive, cardiac, respiratory, and nervous system abnormalities have been observed.

Though rare, a few cases of phenotypically normal individuals with tetrasomy 9p have been documented.

== Causes ==
Tetrasomy 9p is caused by the presence of two additional copies of the short arm of chromosome 9. These two extra copies are found in the cell as an isochromosome, in addition to the normal 46 chromosomes. An isochromosome is formed when one of the arms of a chromosome is duplicated (in this case, the short arm), and the other is lost (in this case, the long arm), forming a chromosome with two identical arms. Varying amounts of the short arm may be incorporated into the isochromosome, and occasionally, small regions of DNA from the long arm are included as well. This extra isochromosome is classified as a small supernumerary marker chromosome.

The disorder is almost never inherited; it most commonly arises through the improper distribution of chromosomes during the formation of eggs or sperm.

== Mechanism ==
The tetrasomy is typically caused by the incorrect distribution of chromosomes during meiosis or mitosis, called nondisjunction. When cell division occurs normally, each daughter cell receives one short arm and one long arm of each chromosome. However, errors during this process may cause one daughter cell to receive two short arms of chromosome 9, while the other cell receives two long arms. The identical arms are subsequently connected via a centromere. In most cases, isochromosomes of 9p contain two centromeres, called a dicentric chromosome.

The tetrasomy can also be formed independently of cell division. Double stranded breaks in the short arm of chromosome 9 may be repaired incorrectly, resulting in the formation of an isochromosome of 9p with a single centromere. This isochromosome can then be passed on during cell division.

=== Mosaicism ===
In most cases, affected individuals carry the tetrasomy in every cell in their bodies. However, some people have the tetrasomy in some of their tissues but not in others; this is referred to as the mosaic form of the syndrome, and often results in less severe symptoms. Non-mosaic tetrasomy 9p is most often the result of abnormal chromosome separation during the formation of eggs or sperm. In contrast, the mosaic form is often a result of a nondisjunction event that occurs early in embryonic development. The type and number of tissues affected in the mosaic form is dependent upon the timing and location of the abnormal division within the developing embryo.

== Diagnosis ==
After birth, galactose-1-phosphate uridyltransferase (GALT) activity in the infant's blood is measured. GALT is regulated by a protein encoded on chromosome 9p, so irregular levels of GALT activity may indicate an underlying chromosomal abnormality. Abnormal results are followed by analysis of blood, skin, and inner cheek cells, typically via fluorescence in situ hybridization, which allows genetic counsellors to physically view the chromosomal composition of the cells. Analysis of more than one tissue type is necessary in order to determine if the tetrasomy is present in its mosaic form. If tetrasomy 9p is confirmed, chromosomal analysis of additional tissue types may be performed in order to estimate the ratio of affected cells in the body.

== Prognosis ==
Though the outcome for individuals with either form of the tetrasomy is highly variable, mosaic individuals consistently experience a more favourable outcome than those with the non-mosaic form. Some affected infants die shortly after birth, particularly those with the non-mosaic tetrasomy. Many patients do not survive to reproductive age, while others are able to function relatively normally in a school or workplace setting. Early diagnosis and intervention has been shown to have a strong positive influence on the prognosis.

=== Recurrence risk ===
Since tetrasomy 9p is not usually inherited, the risk of a couple having a second child with the disorder is minimal. While patients often do not survive to reproductive age, those who do may or may not be fertile. The risk of a patient's child inheriting the disorder is largely dependent on the details of the individual's case.

== See also ==
- The small supernumerary marker chromosome in Tetrasomy 9p
