= Gonadal tissue neoplasm =

- Specialty: Oncology

A gonadal tissue neoplasm is a tumor having any histology characteristic of cells or tissues giving rise to the gonads. These tissues arise from the sex cord and stromal cells. The tumor may be derived from these tissues, or produce them.

Although the tumor is composed of gonadal tissue, it is not necessarily located in an ovary or testicle.

A gonadal tissue neoplasm should not be confused with a urogenital neoplasm, though the two topics are often studied together. The embryology of the gonads is only indirectly related to the embryology of the external genitals and urinary system.

== See also ==
- Gonadoblastoma
- Sex cord–gonadal stromal tumour
