= Pallister–Killian syndrome =

Condition caused by four copies of the short arm of chromosome 12

Pallister-Killian syndrome
- Other names: Tetrasomy 12p mosaicism, Pallister mosaic aneuploidy syndrome
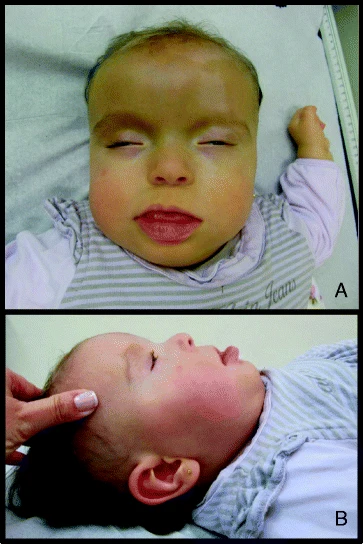
- Photo of the patient with Pallister-Killian syndrome, which shows typical facial features of this syndrome, such as: Hypertelorism, long philtrum with “Pallister lip”, hypopigmented streaks, anteverted nostrils, frontotemporal alopecia.
- Specialty: Medical genetics, Pediatrics
- Symptoms: Multiple birth defects
- Usual onset: Prenatally
- Causes: Small supernumerary marker chromosome
- Prognosis: Stillbirth or death from pneumonia and/or asphyxia is common
- Named after: Philip Pallister; Wolfgang Killian

The Pallister–Killian syndrome (PKS), also termed tetrasomy 12p mosaicism or the Pallister mosaic aneuploidy syndrome, is an extremely rare and severe genetic disorder. PKS is due to the presence of an extra and abnormal chromosome termed a small supernumerary marker chromosome (sSMC). sSMCs contain copies of genetic material from parts of virtually any other chromosome and, depending on the genetic material they carry, can cause various genetic disorders and neoplasms. The sSMC in PKS consists of multiple copies of the short (i.e. "p") arm of chromosome 12. Consequently, the multiple copies of the genetic material in the sSMC plus the two copies of this genetic material in the two normal chromosome 12's are overexpressed and thereby cause the syndrome. Due to a form of genetic mosaicism, however, individuals with PKS differ in the tissue distributions of their sSMC and therefore show different syndrome-related birth defects and disease severities. For example, individuals with the sSMC in their heart tissue are likely to have cardiac structural abnormalities while those without this sSMC localization have a structurally normal heart.

PKS was first described by Philip Pallister in 1977 and further researched by Maria Teschler-Nicola and Wolfgang Killian in 1981.

== Presentation ==
Individuals with PKS present prenatally or at birth with multiple birth defects. These defects include: brain atrophy, agenesis of the corpus callosum, polymicrogyria of the brain, and/or spot calcifications in the brain's lateral sulcus; deafness and/or blindness; autonomic nervous system dysfunctions such as anhidrosis, hypohidrosis, and/or episodic spells of hyperventilation interspersed with breath-holding; symptoms of spinal cord malformations; profound or less commonly mild to severe intellectual disability; epileptic seizures; heart and/or anal defects; diaphragmatic hernias; marked muscle weakness; supernumerary nipples; abnormal facial features such as frontal bossing, high frontal hairline, balding around the temple and frontal areas, sparse eyebrows and lashes, hypertelorism, small and flat nose, full cheeks, long philtrum, large mouth with downturned corners, thin cupid's bow-shaped upper lip, micrognathia (i.e. undersized jaw), disformed ears that are low-set, thick eyebrows, and/or prominent lips and chin; abnormal oral/dental features such as enlarged tongue, overgrowth of the alveolar ridge and/or gums, delayed teeth eruption, and/or missing or double teeth; patchy skin depigmentations; skeletal anomalies such as limb shortening, lymphedema, increased soft tissues in the extremities, short/broad palms and/or fingers, and/or clinodactyly of the fifth fingers or toes; excessive prenatal and birth weights followed by postnatal declines in growth rates; delayed closure of the anterior fontanel; and/or delayed puberty in males but not females.

== Causes ==
PKS is caused by an sSMC that consists of two copies or, less commonly, four copies of the genetic material in the p arm of chromosome 12. Recent studies in two individuals with PKS found their sSMCs consisted specifically of genetic material located in a stretch of chromosome 12 's p arm starting at its band 11 and running to its end. This area, called the PKS critical region, contains three genes, ING4, CHD4, and MFAP5 (also termed the MAGP2 gene), which are candidates for contributing to the development of the syndrome.

One suggested mechanism for the development of the sSMC in PKS involves three sequential events: 1) chromosome 12 suffers a nondisjunction, i.e. a failure of its homologous chromosomes or sister chromatids to separate properly during the second meiosis cell division that forms maternal eggs; 2) while most of the eggs with this nondisjunction die, a rare egg with the nondisjunction acquires a second structural aberration, isochromosome formation, that results in the creation of an extra chromosome consisting of copies of two or four p arms but no q arms of chromosome 12, i.e. the sSMC; and 3) the sSMC-containing egg, after being fertilized by a genetically normal sperm, develops into an offspring containing copies of this sSMC in some but not all cells, tissues, and/or organs consequently have some but not all of the defects associated with PKS. This mechanism applies only to female parents who are by far the most common originators of the sSMC in PKS. The mechanism explaining the few cases in which male parents form a sperm containing this sSMC has not yet been clearly formulated.

== Diagnosis ==
=== Prenatal diagnosis ===
PKS is commonly diagnosed by detecting its causative sSMC as defined by identifying the overexpression of its genetic material. This method has detected the sSMC and therefore diagnosed a fetus as having PKS based on genomic analyses of fetal skin fibroblasts, placenta chorionic villi, cells isolated from the amniotic fluid, fibroblasts isolated from the fetus's umbilical cord, and cells isolated from the fetus's umbilical cord blood. PKS can also be diagnose using fetal ultasound imaging methods. Ultrasound imaging in PKS commonly find fetuses that are too large for their gestational age, contain polyhydramnios (excess amniotic fluid in their amniotic sacs), and have rhizomelic limbs (shortening of the proximal part of the limbs). Less commonly, the imaging evidences diaphragmatic hernias and/or various other major PKS structural malformations. In most cases, however, the ultrasound findings are not diagnostic of PKS. Furthermore, ultrasound diagnoses is best applied in the second or third pregnancy trimester when structural anomalies are more clearly defined and detectable.

Because the prenatal diagnosis of PKS using the methods just cited is difficult, often indecisive, and/or best employed later in a woman's pregnancy, prenatal cell-free DNA screening (cfDNA screening), also known as noninvasive prenatal screening, has been used to diagnose PKS. This method can diagnose PKS in 10 week and older fetuses. In cfDNA screening, DNA from a mothers blood is extracted and screened for the presence of specific chromosome abnormalities such as those associated with the Down syndrome, Patau syndrome (also termed trisomy 13), and Edwards syndrome (also termed trisomy 18). (Small amounts of a fetus's DNA escapes through the placenta to circulate in the mothers blood.) A genome-wide association study done in China used genome-wide cfDNA analyses to diagnose various chromosome-related disorders including PKS. The study scanned the DNA in the blood of 29,007 pregnant women and found three cases with abnormal amount of DNA originating from the entire p-arm of chromosome 12. All three cases were confirmed to have a fetus with PKS. Two of these cases were missed by chromosomal microarray analysis of the placenta and chorionic villi. However, the study did not define the rate of false negative cases, i.e. negative results in women actually carrying a fetus with PKS. While further studies are required, this method may turn out to be a critically useful addition for the prenatal detection of PKS, particularly during early pregnancies for the purpose of pregnancy options counseling.

=== Postnatal diagnosis ===
The postnatal diagnosis of PKS is strongly suggested or indicated in most cases based on finding the key defects of PKS in an individual on physical examination and various radiography, ultrasound, and related methods. However, some individuals with this syndrome do not have a sufficient number of these defects or have a set of defects that are also compatible with other birth defect disorders such as Fryns syndrome, trisomy 12p, and Sifrim-Hitz-Weiss syndrome (also termed CHD4 Neurodevelopmental Disorder). The diagnosis can be confirmed in these cases as well as in all cases of PKS by detecting its sSMC using special methods. This sSMC has been successfully detected (>90% of confirmed cases) in the DNA extracted by a buccal swab taken from the inside of an individual's cheek or the DNA extracted form an individual's cultured skin fibroblasts, i.e. fibroblasts from a skin biopsy grown in a laboratory for at least several days. The sSMC in these tissues or cells is identified by multiplex ligation-dependent probe amplification (i.e. MLPA) or microarray-based comparative genomic hybridization (i.e. array CGH). Because of mosaicism, testing an individual's circulating blood lymphocytes only rarely detects (i.e. gives mostly false negative rate) in true PKS cases.

== See also ==
- List of cutaneous conditions
