= Nondisjunction =

Failure to separate properly during cell division

1. Meiosis I; 2. Meiosis II; 3. Fertilization; 4. Zygote; The left image at the blue arrow is nondisjunction taking place during meiosis II. The right image at the green arrow is nondisjunction taking place during meiosis I. Nondisjunction is when chromosomes fail to separate normally resulting in a gain or loss of chromosomes.

Nondisjunction is the failure of homologous chromosomes or sister chromatids to separate properly during cell division (mitosis/meiosis). There are three forms of nondisjunction: failure of a pair of homologous chromosomes to separate in meiosis I, failure of sister chromatids to separate during meiosis II, and failure of sister chromatids to separate during mitosis. Nondisjunction results in daughter cells with abnormal chromosome numbers (aneuploidy).

Calvin Bridges and Thomas Hunt Morgan are credited with discovering nondisjunction in Drosophila melanogaster sex chromosomes in the spring of 1910, while working in the Zoological Laboratory of Columbia University. Proof of the chromosome theory of heredity emerged from these early studies of chromosome non-disjunction.

== Types ==
In general, nondisjunction can occur in any form of cell division that involves ordered distribution of chromosomal material. Higher animals have three distinct forms of such cell divisions: Meiosis I and meiosis II are specialized forms of cell division occurring during generation of gametes (eggs and sperm) for sexual reproduction, mitosis is the form of cell division used by all other cells of the body.

=== Meiosis II ===
Ovulated eggs become arrested in metaphase II until fertilization triggers the second meiotic division. Similar to the segregation events of mitosis, the pairs of sister chromatids resulting from the separation of bivalents in meiosis I are further separated in anaphase of meiosis II. In oocytes, one sister chromatid is segregated into the second polar body, while the other stays inside the egg. During spermatogenesis, each meiotic division is symmetric such that each primary spermatocyte gives rise to 2 secondary spermatocytes after meiosis I, and eventually 4 spermatids after meiosis II. Meiosis II-nondisjunction may also result in aneuploidy syndromes, but only to a much smaller extent than do segregation failures in meiosis I.

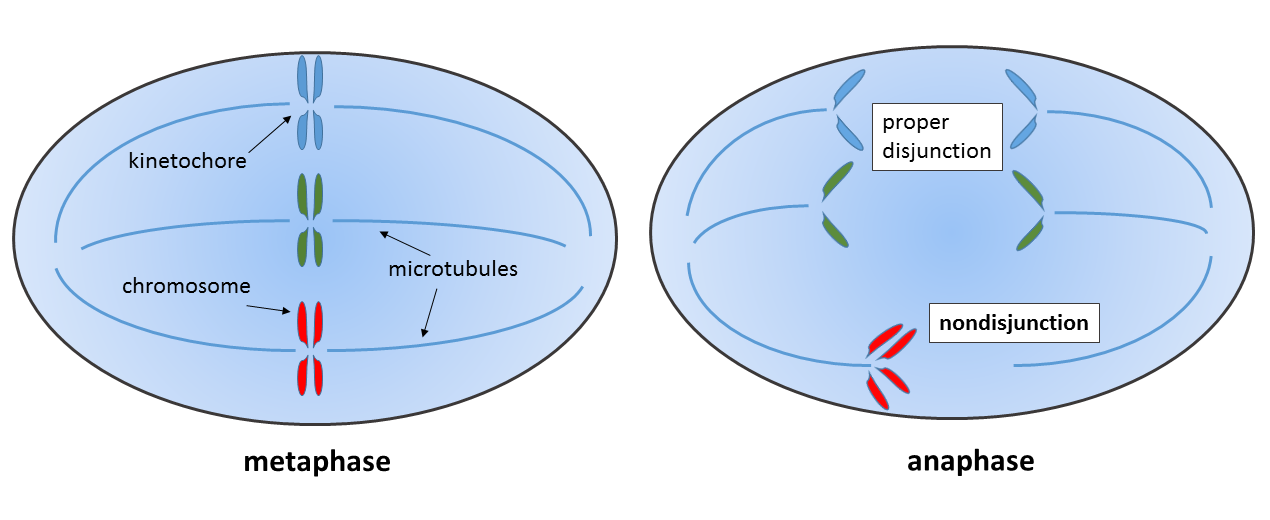
Nondisjunction of sister chromatids during mitosis: Left: Metaphase of mitosis. Chromosome line up in the middle plane, the mitotic spindle forms and the kinetochores of sister chromatids attach to the microtubules. Right: Anaphase of mitosis, where sister chromatids separate and the microtubules pull them in opposite directions. The chromosome shown in red fails to separate properly, its sister chromatids stick together and get pulled to the same side, resulting in mitotic nondisjunction of this chromosome.

=== Mitosis ===
Division of somatic cells through mitosis is preceded by replication of the genetic material in S phase. As a result, each chromosome consists of two sister chromatids held together at the centromere. In the anaphase of mitosis, sister chromatids separate and migrate to opposite cell poles before the cell divides. Nondisjunction during mitosis leads to one daughter receiving both sister chromatids of the affected chromosome while the other gets none. This is known as a chromatin bridge or an anaphase bridge. Mitotic nondisjunction results in somatic mosaicism, since only daughter cells originating from the cell where the nondisjunction event has occurred will have an abnormal number of chromosomes. Nondisjunction during mitosis can contribute to the development of some forms of cancer, e.g., retinoblastoma (see below). Chromosome nondisjunction in mitosis can be attributed to the inactivation of topoisomerase II, condensin, or separase. Meiotic nondisjunction has been well studied in Saccharomyces cerevisiae. This yeast undergoes mitosis similarly to other eukaryotes. Chromosome bridges occur when sister chromatids are held together post replication by DNA-DNA topological entanglement and the cohesion complex. During anaphase, cohesin is cleaved by separase. Topoisomerase II and condensin are responsible for removing catenations.

== Molecular mechanisms ==
=== Central role of the spindle assembly checkpoint ===
The spindle assembly checkpoint (SAC) is a molecular safe-guarding mechanism that governs proper chromosome segregation in eukaryotic cells. SAC inhibits progression into anaphase until all homologous chromosomes (bivalents, or tetrads) are properly aligned to the spindle apparatus. Only then, SAC releases its inhibition of the anaphase promoting complex (APC), which in turn irreversibly triggers progression through anaphase.

=== Sex-specific differences in meiosis ===
Surveys of cases of human aneuploidy syndromes have shown that most of them are maternally derived. This raises the question: Why is female meiosis more error prone? The most obvious difference between female oogenesis and male spermatogenesis is the prolonged arrest of oocytes in late stages of prophase I for many years up to several decades. Male gametes on the other hand quickly go through all stages of meiosis I and II. Another important difference between male and female meiosis concerns the frequency of recombination between homologous chromosomes: In the male, almost all chromosome pairs are joined by at least one crossover, while more than 10% of human oocytes contain at least one bivalent without any crossover event. Failures of recombination or inappropriately located crossovers have been well documented as contributors to the occurrence of nondisjunction in humans.

=== Age-related loss of cohesin ties ===
Due to the prolonged arrest of human oocytes, weakening of cohesive ties holding together chromosomes and reduced activity of the SAC may contribute to maternal age-related errors in segregation control. The cohesin complex is responsible for keeping together sister chromatids and provides binding sites for spindle attachment. Cohesin is loaded onto newly replicated chromosomes in oogonia during fetal development. Mature oocytes have only limited capacity for reloading cohesin after completion of S phase. The prolonged arrest of human oocytes prior to completion of meiosis I may therefore result in considerable loss of cohesin over time. Loss of cohesin is assumed to contribute to incorrect microtubule-kinetochore attachment and chromosome segregation errors during meiotic divisions.

== Consequences ==
The result of this error is a cell with an imbalance of chromosomes. Such a cell is said to be aneuploid. Loss of a single chromosome (2n-1), in which the daughter cell(s) with the defect will have one chromosome missing from one of its pairs, is referred to as a monosomy. Gaining a single chromosome, in which the daughter cell(s) with the defect will have one chromosome in addition to its pairs is referred to as a trisomy. In the event that an aneuploidic gamete is fertilized, a number of syndromes might result.

=== Monosomy ===
The only known survivable monosomy in humans is Turner syndrome, where the affected individual is monosomic for the X chromosome (see below). Other monosomies are usually lethal during early fetal development, and survival is only possible if not all the cells of the body are affected in case of a mosaicism (see below), or if the normal number of chromosomes is restored via duplication of the single monosomic chromosome ("chromosome rescue").

==== Turner syndrome (X monosomy) (45, X0) ====
Karyotype of X monosomy (Turner syndrome) This condition is characterized by the presence of only one X chromosome and no Y chromosome (see bottom right corner).

Complete loss of an entire X chromosome accounts for about half the cases of Turner syndrome. The importance of both X chromosomes during embryonic development is underscored by the observation that the overwhelming majority (>99%) of fetuses with only one X chromosome (karyotype 45, X0) are spontaneously aborted.

=== Autosomal trisomy ===
The term autosomal trisomy means that a chromosome other than the sex chromosomes X and Y is present in 3 copies instead of the normal number of 2 in diploid cells.

==== Down syndrome (trisomy 21) ====
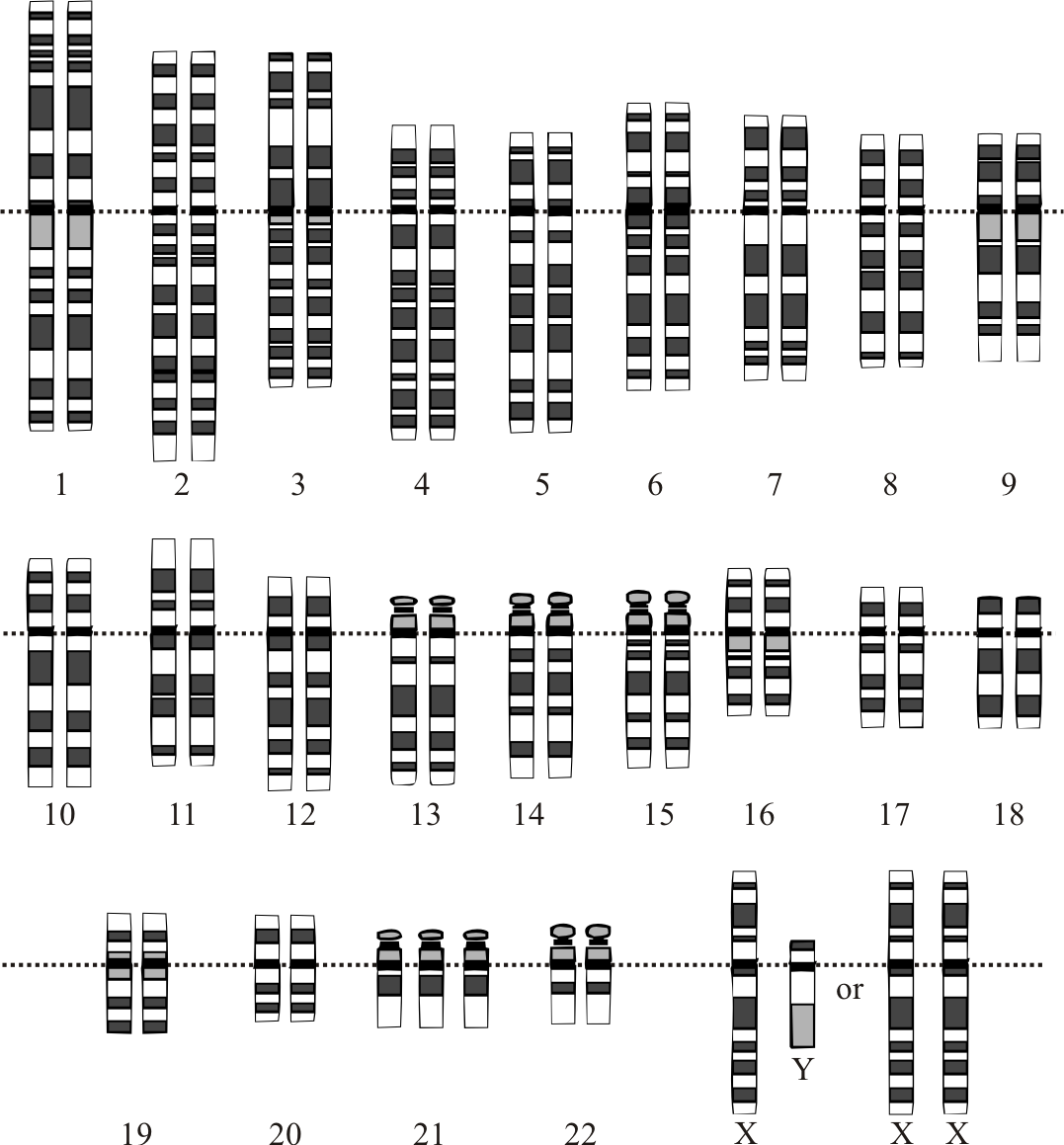
Karyotype of trisomy 21 (Down syndrome) Note that chromosome 21 is present in 3 copies, while all other chromosomes show the normal diploid state with 2 copies. Most cases of trisomy of chromosome 21 are caused by a nondisjunction event during meiosis I (see text).

Down syndrome, a trisomy of chromosome 21, is the most common anomaly of chromosome number in humans. The majority of cases result from nondisjunction during maternal meiosis I. Trisomy occurs in at least 0.3% of newborns and in nearly 25% of spontaneous abortions. It is the leading cause of pregnancy wastage and is the most common known cause of intellectual disability. It is well documented that advanced maternal age is associated with greater risk of meiotic nondisjunction leading to Down syndrome. This may be associated with the prolonged meiotic arrest of human oocytes potentially lasting for more than four decades.

==== Edwards syndrome (trisomy 18) and Patau syndrome (trisomy 13) ====
Human autosomal trisomies compatible with live birth, other than Down syndrome (trisomy 21), are Edwards syndrome (trisomy 18) and Patau syndrome (trisomy 13). Complete trisomies of other chromosomes are usually not viable and represent a relatively frequent cause of miscarriage. Only in rare cases of a mosaicism, the presence of a normal cell line, in addition to the trisomic cell line, may support the development of a viable trisomy of the other chromosomes.

=== Sex chromosome aneuploidy ===
The term sex chromosome aneuploidy summarizes conditions with an abnormal number of sex chromosomes, i.e., other than XX (female) or XY (male). Formally, X chromosome monosomy (Turner syndrome, see above) can also be classified as a form of sex chromosome aneuploidy.

==== Klinefelter syndrome (47, XXY) ====
Klinefelter syndrome is the most common sex chromosome aneuploidy in humans. It represents the most frequent cause of hypogonadism and infertility in men. Most cases are caused by nondisjunction errors in paternal meiosis I. About eighty percent of individuals with this syndrome have one extra X chromosome resulting in the karyotype XXY. The remaining cases have either multiple additional sex chromosomes (48,XXXY; 48,XXYY; 49,XXXXY), mosaicism (46,XY/47,XXY), or structural chromosome abnormalities.

==== XYY Male (47, XYY) ====
The incidence of XYY syndrome is approximately 1 in 800–1000 male births. Many cases remain undiagnosed because of their normal appearance and fertility, and the absence of severe symptoms. The extra Y chromosome is usually a result of nondisjunction during paternal meiosis II.

==== Trisomy X (47,XXX) ====
Trisomy X is a form of sex chromosome aneuploidy where females have three instead of two X chromosomes. Most patients are only mildly affected by neuropsychological and physical symptoms. Studies examining the origin of the extra X chromosome observed that about 58–63% of cases were caused by nondisjunction in maternal meiosis I, 16–18% by nondisjunction in maternal meiosis II, and the remaining cases by post-zygotic, i.e., mitotic, nondisjunction.

=== Uniparental disomy ===
Uniparental disomy denotes the situation where both chromosomes of a chromosome pair are inherited from the same parent and are therefore identical. This phenomenon most likely is the result of a pregnancy that started as a trisomy due to nondisjunction. Since most trisomies are lethal, the fetus only survives because it loses one of the three chromosomes and becomes disomic. Uniparental disomy of chromosome 15 is, for example, seen in some cases of Prader-Willi syndrome and Angelman syndrome.

=== Mosaicism syndromes ===
Mosaicism syndromes can be caused by mitotic nondisjunction in early fetal development. As a consequence, the organism evolves as a mixture of cell lines with differing ploidy (number of chromosomes). Mosaicism may be present in some tissues, but not in others. Affected individuals may have a patchy or asymmetric appearance. Examples of mosaicism syndromes include Pallister-Killian syndrome and Hypomelanosis of Ito.

=== Mosaicism in malignant transformation ===
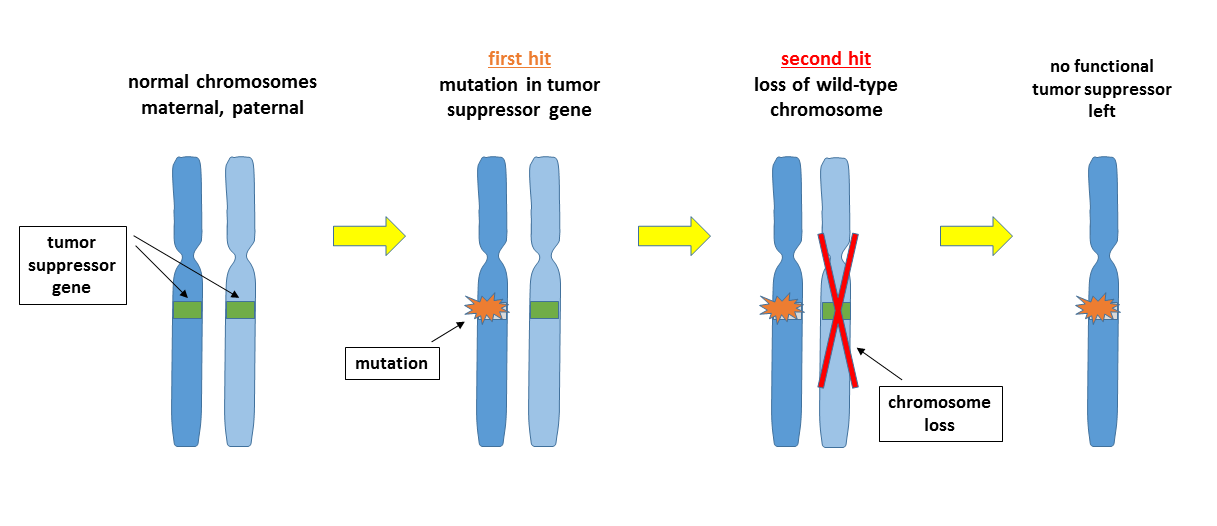
Loss of a tumor suppressor gene locus according to the two-hit model: In the first hit, the tumor suppressor gene on one of the two chromosomes is affected by a mutation that makes the gene product non-functional. This mutation may arise spontaneously as a DNA replication error or may be induced by a DNA damaging agent. The second hit removes the remaining wild-type chromosome, for example through a mitotic nondisjunction event. There are several other potential mechanisms for each of the two steps, for example an additional mutation, an unbalanced translocation, or a gene deletion by recombination. As a result of the double lesion, the cell may become malignant because it is no longer able to express the tumor suppressor protein.

Development of cancer often involves multiple alterations of the cellular genome (Knudson hypothesis). Human retinoblastoma is a well studied example of a cancer type where mitotic nondisjunction can contribute to malignant transformation: Mutations of the RB1 gene, which is located on chromosome 13 and encodes the tumor suppressor retinoblastoma protein, can be detected by cytogenetic analysis in many cases of retinoblastoma. Mutations of the RB1 locus in one copy of chromosome 13 are sometimes accompanied by loss of the other wild-type chromosome 13 through mitotic nondisjunction. By this combination of lesions, affected cells completely lose expression of functioning tumor suppressor protein.

== Diagnosis ==
=== Preimplantation genetic diagnosis ===
Pre-implantation genetic diagnosis (PGD or PIGD) is a technique used to identify genetically normal embryos and is useful for couples who have a family history of genetic disorders. This is an option for people choosing to procreate through IVF. PGD is considered difficult due to it being both time consuming and having success rates only comparable to routine IVF.

=== Karyotyping ===
Karyotyping involves performing an amniocentesis in order to study the cells of an unborn fetus during metaphase 1. Light microscopy can be used to visually determine if aneuploidy is an issue.

=== Polar body diagnosis ===
Polar body diagnosis (PBD) can be used to detect maternally derived chromosomal aneuploidies as well as translocations in oocytes. The advantage of PBD over PGD is that it can be accomplished in a short amount of time. This is accomplished through zona drilling or laser drilling.

=== Blastomere biopsy ===
Blastomere biopsy is a technique in which blastomeres are removed from the zona pellucida. It is commonly used to detect aneuploidy. Genetic analysis is conducted once the procedure is complete. Additional studies are needed to assess the risk associated with the procedure.

== Lifestyle/environmental hazards ==
Exposure of spermatozoa to lifestyle, environmental and/or occupational hazards may increase the risk of aneuploidy. Cigarette smoke is a known aneugen (aneuploidy inducing agent). It is associated with increases in aneuploidy ranging from 1.5 to 3.0-fold. Other studies indicate factors such as alcohol consumption, occupational exposure to benzene, and exposure to the insecticides fenvalerate and carbaryl also increase aneuploidy.
