= Isochromosome =

Chromosome abnormality

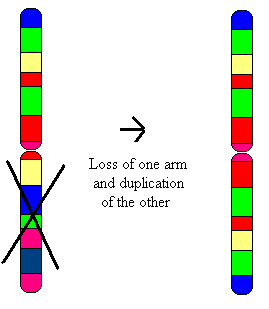
Isochromosome in which the arms are mirror copies of each other.

An isochromosome is an unbalanced structural abnormality in which the arms of the chromosome are mirror images of each other. The chromosome consists of two copies of either the long (q) arm or the short (p) arm because isochromosome formation is equivalent to a simultaneous duplication and deletion of genetic material. Consequently, there is partial trisomy of the genes present in the isochromosome and partial monosomy of the genes in the lost arm.

== Nomenclature ==
An isochromosome can be abbreviated as i(chromosome number)(centromeric breakpoint). For example, an isochromosome of chromosome 17 containing two q arms can be identified as i(17)(q10) (seen in medulloblastoma).

== Mechanism ==
Isochromosomes can be created during mitosis and meiosis through a misdivision of the centromere or U-type strand exchange.

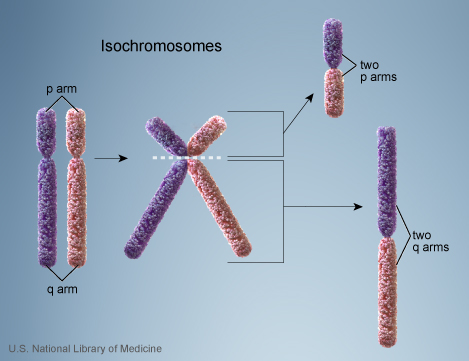
Isochromosome formation through the misdivision of the centromere. Monocentric isochromosomes contain arms that are mirror images of each other.

=== Centromere misdivision ===
Under normal separation of sister chromatids in anaphase, the centromere will divide longitudinally, or parallel to the long axis of the chromosome. An isochromosome is created when the centromere is divided transversely, or perpendicular to the long axis of the chromosome. The division is usually not occurring in the centromere itself, but in an area surrounding the centromere, also known as a pericentric region. It is proposed that these sites of exchange contain homologous sequences between sister chromatids. Although the resulting chromosome may appear monocentric with only one centromere, it is isodicentric with two centromeres very close to each other; resulting in a potential loss of genetic material found on the other arms. Misdivision of the centromere can also produce monocentric isochromosomes, but they are not as common as dicentric isochromosomes.

=== U-type strand exchange ===
A more common mechanism in the formation of isochromosomes is through the breakage and fusion of sister chromatids, most likely occurring in early anaphase of mitosis or meiosis. A double-stranded break in the pericentric region of the chromosome is repaired when the sister chromatids, each containing a centromere, are fused together. This U-type exchange of genetic material creates an isodicentric chromosome. Misdivision of the centromere and U-type exchange can occur in sister chromatids, thus creating an isochromosome with genetically identical arms. However, U-type exchange can also occur for homologous chromosomes which creates an isochromosome with homologous arms. This exchange between homologues is most likely due to homologous sequences containing low copy repeats. Regardless of the chromosome involved in U-type exchange, the acentric fragment of the chromosome is lost, thus creating a partial monosomy of genes located in that portion of the acentric chromosome.

== Consequences ==
The most common isochromosome is the X sex chromosome. Acrocentric autosomal chromosomes 13, 14, 15, 21, and 22 are also common candidates for isochromosome formation. Chromosomes containing smaller arms are more likely to become isochromosomes because the loss of genetic material in those arms can be tolerated.

=== Turner syndrome ===
Turner syndrome is a condition in females in which there is partial or complete loss of one X chromosome. This causes symptoms such as growth and sexual development problems. In 15% of Turner syndrome patients, the structural abnormality is isochromosome X, which is composed of two copies of the q arm (i(Xq)). A majority of i(Xq) are created by U-type strand exchange. A breakage and reunion in the pericentric region of the p arm results in a dicentric isochromosome. Some of the p arm can be found in this formation of i(Xq), but a majority of the genetic material on the p arm is lost so it is considered absent. Since the p-arm of the X chromosome contains genes that are necessary for normal sexual development, Turner's syndrome patients experience phenotypic effects. Alternatively, the increase in dosage of genes on the q arm may be involved in a 10-fold increase in risk of i(Xq) Turner's patients developing autoimmune thyroiditis, a disease in which the body creates antibodies to target and destroy thyroid cells.

=== Neoplasia ===
Neoplasia is uncontrolled cell growth, resulting in the creation of a tumour. In many different forms of neoplasia, isochromosome 17q is the most frequent neoplasia associated isochromosome and corresponds with poor patient survival. Unique DNA sequences, known as low copy repeats, occur in the pericentric region of the p arm, so a crossover event in that area can create a dicentric isochromosome through U-type strand exchange. The neoplasia created from i(17q) is caused by a decrease and increase in gene dosage from the monosomy of the p arm and trisomy of the q arm, respectively. Many candidate tumour suppressor genes are found on the lost p arm, allowing the tumour cell population to be maintained. It is debated whether the loss of tumour suppressor gene p53, located on 17p, is involved in the central pathogenesis of some neoplasia. The presence of one p53 gene can be functionally active, but its relation to other oncogenes can alter its expression levels when present only in one copy. Since the genetic sequences involved in i(17q) neoplasia are large, it is difficult to determine which genes, or combination of genes, are involved in tumour growth.
