= XY gonadal dysgenesis =

- Other names: Swyer syndrome
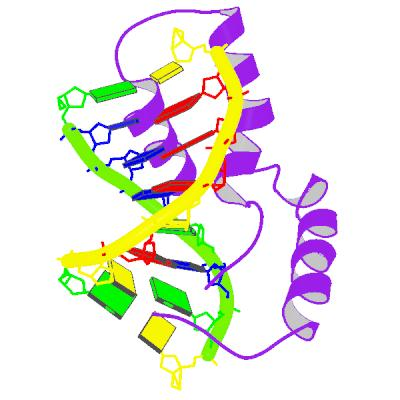
- Protein SRY
- Specialty: Medical genetics

XY complete gonadal dysgenesis, also known as Swyer syndrome, is a condition resulting in a female phenotype in an individual with a 46,XY karyotype. Though they typically have normal vulvas, those affected typically have underdeveloped gonads, fibrous tissue termed "streak gonads", and without hormone replacement therapy, typically will not experience puberty. The cause is often, but not always, inactivation of the SRY gene, which is responsible for sexual differentiation. Pregnancy is sometimes possible in Swyer syndrome with assisted reproductive technology, and, in at least one case, without it.

The syndrome was named after Gerald Swyer, an endocrinologist based at London's University College Hospital, who first reported two cases in 1955.

== Signs and symptoms ==
Those with Swyer syndrome develop phenotypes typical of females and nonfunctional gonads. Individuals are most commonly diagnosed during adolescence after puberty fails to occur.

The consequences of Swyer syndrome without treatment:

- The individual's gonads do not have two X chromosomes, so the breasts will not develop and the uterus will not grow and menstruate until estrogen is administered. This is often given transdermally.
- Their gonads cannot make progesterone, so menstrual periods will not be predictable until progestin is administered, usually as a pill.
- Their gonads cannot produce eggs, so conceiving children is not possible.
- Streak gonads with Y chromosome-containing cells have a high likelihood of developing cancer, especially gonadoblastoma. Streak gonads are usually removed within a year or so of diagnosis, since the cancer can begin during infancy.
- Osteopenia is often present.

== Genetics ==
Genetic associations of Swyer syndrome include:

Type	OMIM	Gene	Locus
46,XY gonadal dysgenesis, complete, SRY-related	400044	SRY	Yp11.3
46,XY gonadal dysgenesis, complete or partial, DHH-related	233420	DHH	12q13.1
46,XY gonadal dysgenesis, complete or partial, with or without adrenal failure	612965	NR5A1	9q33
46,XY gonadal dysgenesis, complete, CBX2-related	613080	CBX2	17q25
46,XY gonadal dysgenesis, complete or partial, with 9p24.3 deletion	154230	DMRT1/2	9p24.3

Seven other genes have been identified with probable associations that are as yet less clearly understood.

=== Pure gonadal dysgenesis ===
There are several forms of gonadal dysgenesis. The term "pure gonadal dysgenesis" (PGD) has been used to describe conditions with normal sets of sex chromosomes (e.g., 46,XX or 46,XY), as opposed to those whose gonadal dysgenesis results from missing all or part of the second sex chromosome. The latter group includes those with Turner syndrome (i.e., 45,X) and its variants, as well as those with mixed gonadal dysgenesis and a mixture of cell lines, some containing a Y chromosome (e.g., 46,XY/45,X).

Thus Swyer syndrome is referred to as PGD, 46,XY, and XX gonadal dysgenesis as PGD, 46,XX. People with PGD have a normal karyotype but may have defects of a specific gene on a chromosome.

In 2007, a case was reported of a woman with 46,XY complete gonadal dysgenesis whose mother had Turners Syndrome mosaicism with a 46,XY karyotype in peripheral lymphocytes, 80% 46,XY and 20% 45,X in cultured skin fibroblasts, and 93% 46,XY, 6% 45,X, and <1% 46,XX in the ovary.

== Pathogenesis ==
The first known step of sexual differentiation of a male fetus is the development of testes. The early stages of testicular formation in the second month of gestation require the action of several genes, one of the earliest and most important of which is SRY: the sex-determining region of the Y chromosome.

When such a gene is defective, the indifferent gonads fail to differentiate into testes in an XY fetus. Without testes, no testosterone or anti-Müllerian hormone (AMH) is produced. Without testosterone, the Wolffian ducts fail to develop, so no internal male organs are formed. Also, the lack of testosterone means that no dihydrotestosterone is formed and consequently the external genitalia fail to virilize, resulting in a normal vulva. Without AMH, the Müllerian ducts develop into normal internal female organs (uterus, fallopian tubes, cervix, vagina).

== Diagnosis ==
Due to the inability of the streak gonads to produce sex hormones (both estrogens and androgens), most of the secondary sex characteristics do not develop. This is especially true of estrogenic changes such as breast development, widening of the pelvis and hips, and menstrual periods. As the adrenal glands can make limited amounts of androgens and are not affected by this syndrome, most of these persons will develop pubic hair, though it often remains sparse.

Evaluation of delayed puberty usually reveals elevation of gonadotropins, indicating that the pituitary is providing the signal for puberty but the gonads are failing to respond. The next steps of the evaluation usually include checking a karyotype and imaging of the pelvis. The karyotype reveals XY chromosomes and the imaging demonstrates the presence of a uterus but no ovaries (the streak gonads are not usually seen by most imaging). Although an XY karyotype can also indicate a person with complete androgen insensitivity syndrome, the absence of breasts, and the presence of a uterus and pubic hair exclude the possibility. At this point it is usually possible for a physician to make a diagnosis of Swyer syndrome.

=== Related conditions ===
Swyer syndrome represents one phenotypic result of a failure of the gonads to develop properly, and hence is part of a class of conditions termed gonadal dysgenesis. There are many forms of gonadal dysgenesis.

Swyer syndrome is an example of a condition in which an externally unambiguous female body carries dysgenetic, atypical, or abnormal gonads. Other examples include complete androgen insensitivity syndrome, partial X chromosome deletions, lipoid congenital adrenal hyperplasia, and Turner syndrome.

== Treatment ==
Upon diagnosis, estrogen and progestogen therapy is typically commenced, promoting the development of female characteristics.

Hormone replacement therapy can also reduce the likelihood of osteoporosis.

== Epidemiology ==
A 2017 study estimated that the incidence of Swyer syndrome is approximately 1 in 100,000 females. Fewer than 100 cases have been reported as of 2018. There are extremely rare instances of familial Swyer syndrome.

== People with XY gonadal dysgenesis ==
- Arisleyda Dilone, American director and actress
- Sara Forsberg, Finnish singer, songwriter, and television presenter

== See also ==
- 5α-Reductase 2 deficiency
- Congenital adrenal hyperplasia
- Disorders of sex development
- Fraser syndrome
- Homology (biology)
- Intersex
- Persistent Müllerian duct syndrome
- Sex chromosome anomalies
- XX male syndrome
