= Dysgenesis =

Dysgenesis may refer to:

- Dysgenesis (embryology), abnormal organ development during embryonic growth and development
  - Gonadal dysgenesis
  - Adrenal dysgenesis
  - Thyroid dysgenesis
  - Anterior segment mesenchymal dysgenesis
- Hybrid dysgenesis, a high rate of mutation in germ line cells of Drosophila strains

== See also ==
- Dysgenics, any decrease in the prevalence of traits due to selective pressure disfavouring their reproduction
