= Ovarian disorders =

Ovarian disorders may refer to diseases primarily affecting, or centered on, the ovaries.

Some examples of ovarian diseases are:

- Polyendocrine metabolic ovarian syndrome (PMOS)
- Turner syndrome
- Hypogonadism
- Ovarian cancer
