= Choledochoduodenostomy =

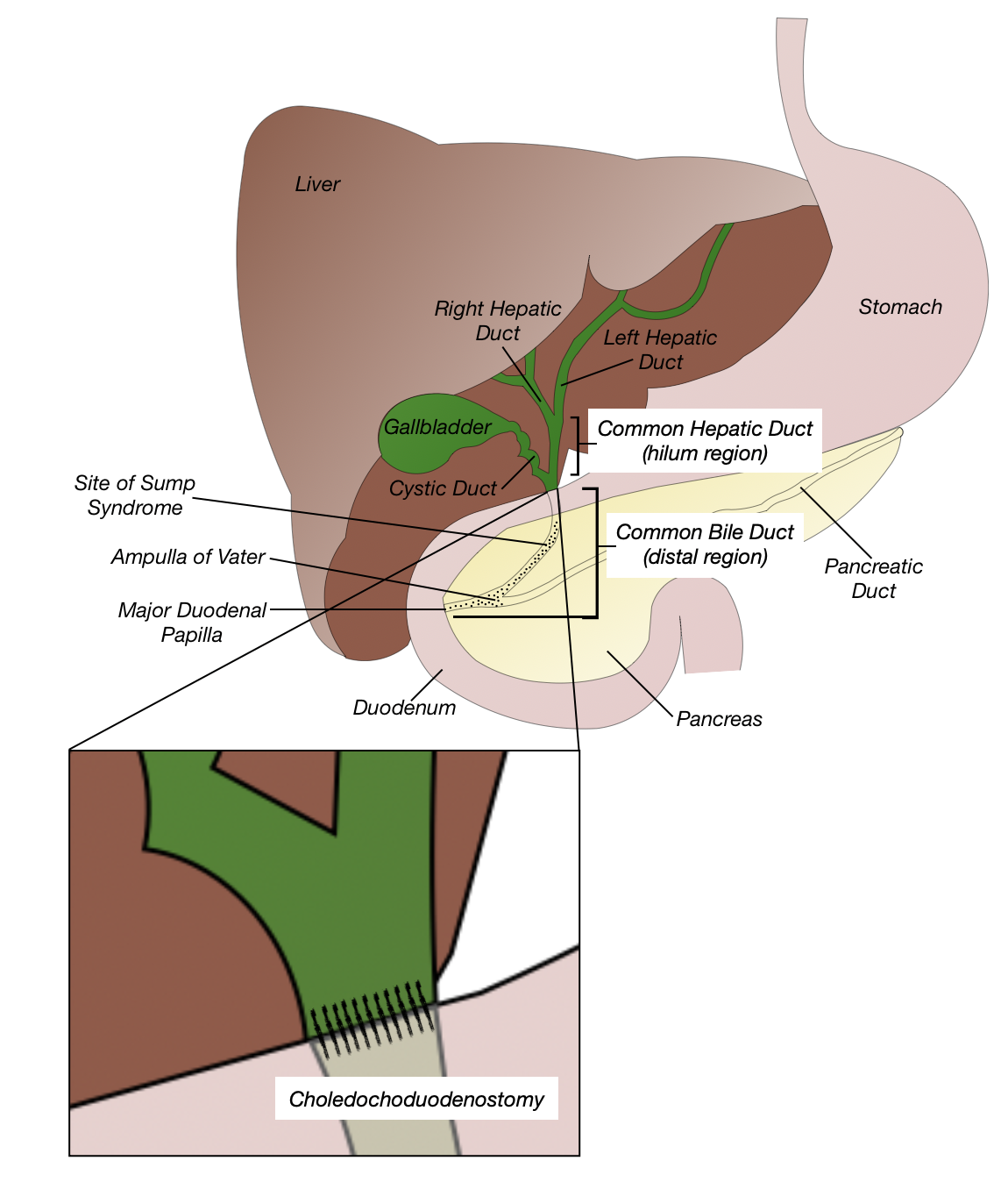
- Specialty: Gastroenterology

Choledochoduodenostomy (CDD) is a surgical procedure to create an anastomosis, a surgical connection, between the common bile duct (CBD) and an alternative portion of the duodenum. In healthy individuals, the CBD meets the pancreatic duct at the ampulla of Vater, which drains via the major duodenal papilla to the second part of duodenum. In cases of benign conditions such as narrowing of the distal CBD or recurrent CBD stones, performing a CDD provides the diseased patient with CBD drainage and decompression. A side-to-side anastomosis is usually performed.

Bile from the gallbladder is carried to the CBD and emptied into the duodenum. CBD drainage might be obstructed due to distal CBD stricture, which is narrowing of the CBD due to the presence of scar tissue within the duct, and choledocholithiasis, the presence of gallstones. Obstruction can occur when gallstones may be too large to pass through the CBD into the duodenum.

Liver tests are performed before and after the operation. During surgery, the duodenum should be repositioned in close proximity with the CBD to ensure a tension-free anastomosis. 8 incisions are made, with one in the CBD and one in the duodenum. Sutures are performed between the incisions to create a new pathway. Postoperative complications include inflammation and narrowing within the surgical site and sump syndrome. Given that the duodenum is in a diseased state, or a tension-free anastomosis cannot be created, a CDD should not be performed and alternative bypass procedures could be considered. Currently, CDD accounts for approximately 1% of all biliary operations to provide CBD drainage. 38% of the patients undergo CDD as a primary operation (first treatment given for a disease) and 60% of the patients undergo CDD as a secondary procedure (a surgical procedure which is performed to improve conditions found to exist during the primary surgery). CDD is more often performed in the elderly with the mean age of the patients being around 61 years.

== Medical Uses and Indications ==
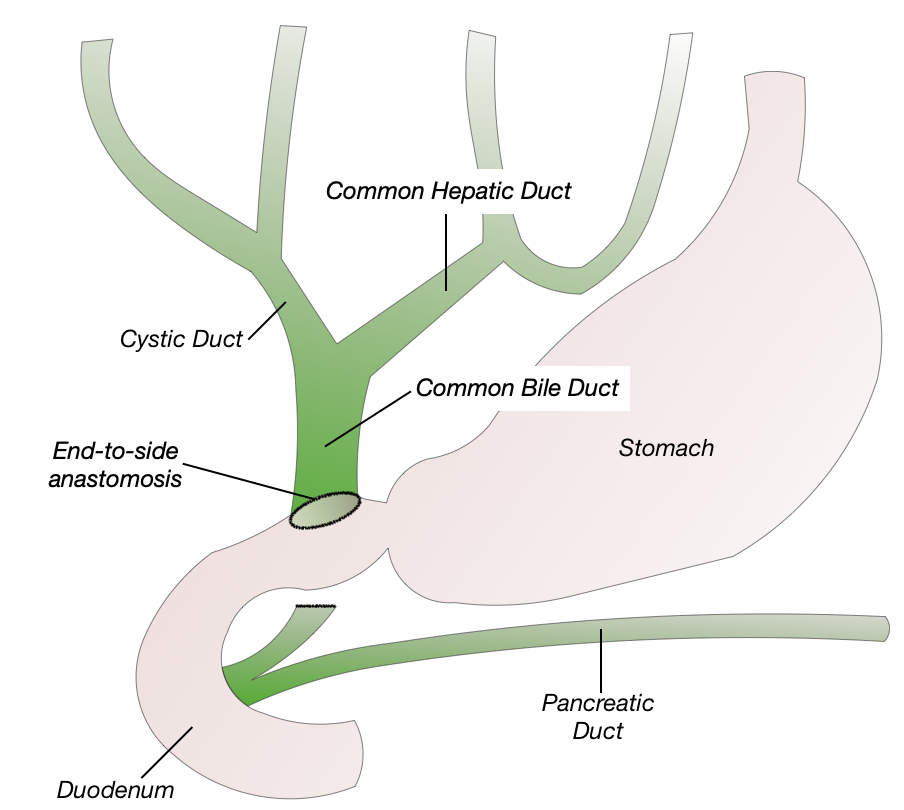
End-to-Side Anastomosis

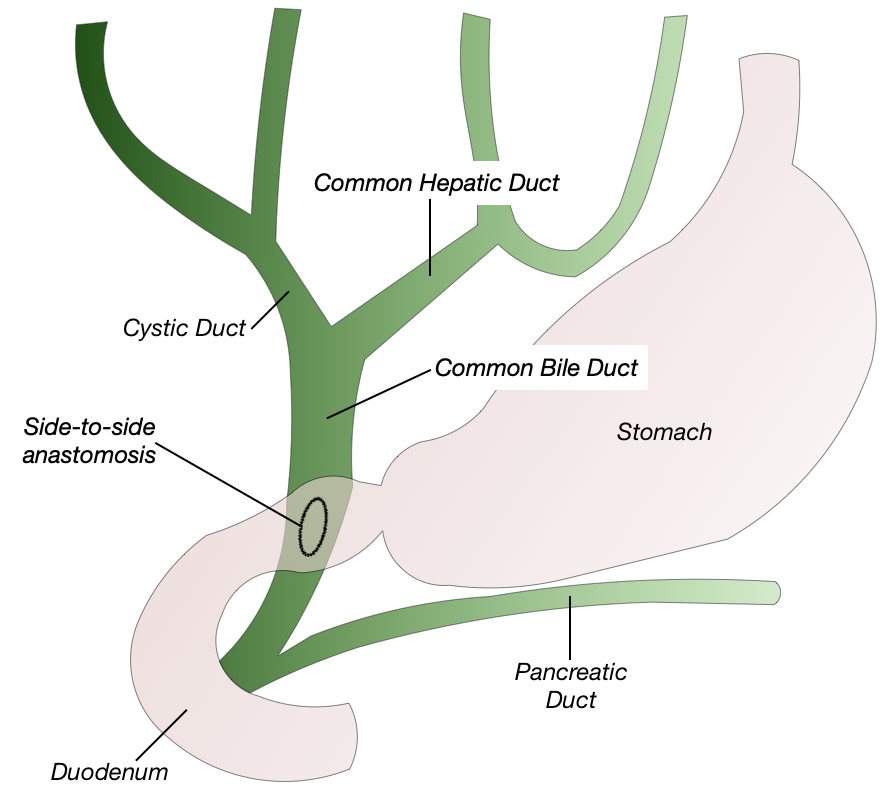
Side-to-Side Anastomosis

CDD creates an anastomosis to allow free flow of bile from the CBD into the duodenum. Side-to-side anastomosis and end-to-side anastomosis are two procedures that can be done. Side-to-side anastomosis is preferred as the distal CBD blood supply is poor and more suitable to the laparoscopic approach, which requires limited anterior CBD dissection. Performing an end-to-side anastomosis risks ischemia and recurrent stenosis.

CDD is an alternative to choledochojejunostomy, a procedure which involves creating an anastomosis of the CBD to the jejunum. CDD is less technically challenging as the procedure is fast and simple with less anastomotic sites and does not require the creation of a Roux-en-Y anastomosis. It also has better endoscopic access to the biliary tree and more physiologic bile drainage.

CDD is used in the treatment of biliary obstruction caused by various factors shown below or when alternative treatment options were not accessible. Other less common indications include operative injuries, or chronic dilation of the CBD.

=== Indications ===
==== Choledocholithiasis ====
Gallstone disease is considered to be one of the most common digestive diseases. It is prevalent regardless of ethnicity with rates in the United States and Europe reported to be approximately 10-15%. It affects about 25 million people in the US and nearly 1 million people diagnosed annually will need to be treated. Studies have shown that 58-72% of patients with symptomatic gallstones will have ongoing symptoms and complications.

With multiple stones present, the difficulty in clearance of the CBD can lead to biliary blockage. A CDD allows for the passage of any retained gallstones, such as impacted stones, or stones where endoscopic treatments of extraction are not possible.

==== Ampullary Stenosis ====
The narrowing of the Ampulla of Vater is either verified by a 3mm instrumental probe being unable to pass through the ampulla, or the lack of dye flowing into the duodenum when a cholangiogram is carried out, indicating obstructed bile flow. Any attempts to enlarge the stenosis can lead to perforation of the duodenum wall or CBD, or damage to the pancreas, further limiting bile flow. This is present in approximately 10% of patients with persistent or recurrent biliary colic after cholecystectomy.

==== Chronic Pancreatitis ====
In addition to disrupted pancreatic function and physiology, long-term pancreatic inflammation can lead to distal CBD blockage. Chronic pancreatitis poses a high risk for developing pancreatic cancer. Creating an alternative passage from the CBD to the duodenum is done when surgical resection of the tumour is not available. The prevalence of this disease is 0.05% in industrialised countries. This disease often develops in patients between the ages of 30 and 40, and is more common in men.

==== Malignant Neoplasms ====
Cancerous tumours arising from the CBD, the ampulla, or the portion of the duodenum near the ampulla can result in distal CBD obstruction. When the masses are incapable of being surgically removed, CDD can be performed. In some cases where the growing tumour occludes the new pathway, CDD will only provide palliative relief. It is recommended to use alternative procedures that allow for relief farther away from the tumor. In the United States, an estimated 6000-7000 new cases of gallbladder carcinoma and 3000-4000 new cases of bile ducts carcinoma are diagnosed annually.

== Contraindications ==
Contraindications for the procedure are based on the patient’s physiologic condition of the CBD and the duodenum.

=== Duodenal Ulceration ===
Duodenal ulceration can lead to inflammation or fibrosis of the duodenum. Duodenal scarring or blockage makes it subpar for an anastomosis to be performed. As an alternative, a choledochojejunostomy can be performed.

=== Tumour Growth ===
Malignant cell growth, such as a pancreatic head tumor, can prevent proper repositioning of the duodenum to be in close contact with the bile duct. Performing a CDD may lead to a tension-filled surgical anastomosis, leading to bile leakage and jaundice.

There is also the possibility of active tumour growth obstructing the CBD. Alternative procedures could be considered, such as a Roux-en-Y hepaticojejunostomy (a connection made between the hepatic duct and the jejunum).

== Technique ==
=== Preoperative preparation ===
Before surgery, liver function tests are carried out. An ultrasound is conducted to establish the location of biliary tract obstruction as well as the diameter of the CBD. Antibiotic prophylaxis are provided to the patient. Pre-surgical biliary stenting (a tube used to keep the biliary duct open) should be avoided, as it increases the likelihood of contracting infections and makes performing surgical anastomosis more difficult.

=== Procedure ===
1. The patient is placed under general anesthesia.
2. A Kocher’s incision is made in the upper right quadrant. An upper midline incision can also be made.
3. A caliper or metal ruler is used to measure the CBD. The diameter should be greater or equal to 16mm, while its opening should be 14mm or greater.
4. The gallbladder is removed (cholecystectomy).
5. Kocherization of the duodenum is performed, which involves mobilisation of the duodenum to expose the distal portion of the CBD. For anastomosis to occur, the second portion of the duodenum should be placed anterior to the distal CBD.
6. An incision should be made in the hepatoduodenal ligament for the surgeon to visualise the common bile duct.
7. An incision of approximately 2 cm is made in the CBD (choledochotomy). The incision made should be adjacent to the superior surface of the mobilised duodenum.
8. A duodenotomy is performed. The longitudinal duodenal cut should be located slightly inferior to the choledochotomy. As the small intestine is known to stretch during anastomosis creation, the duodenal incision should be around 70% of the length of the CBD incision.
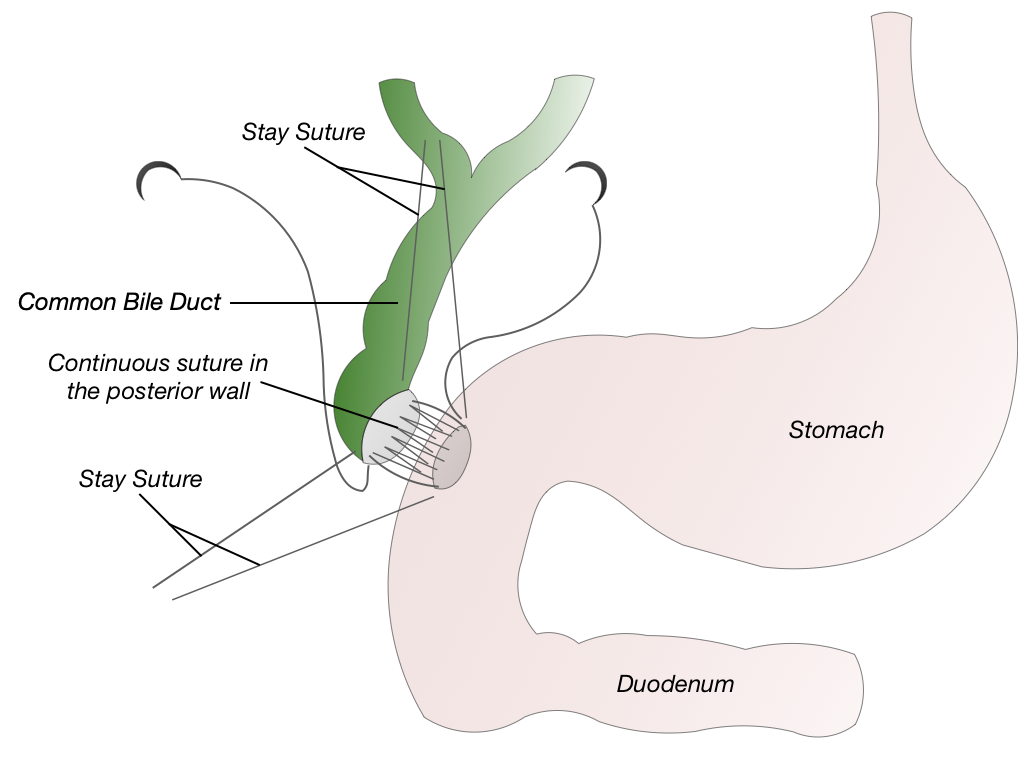
  Posterior Wall Anastomosis
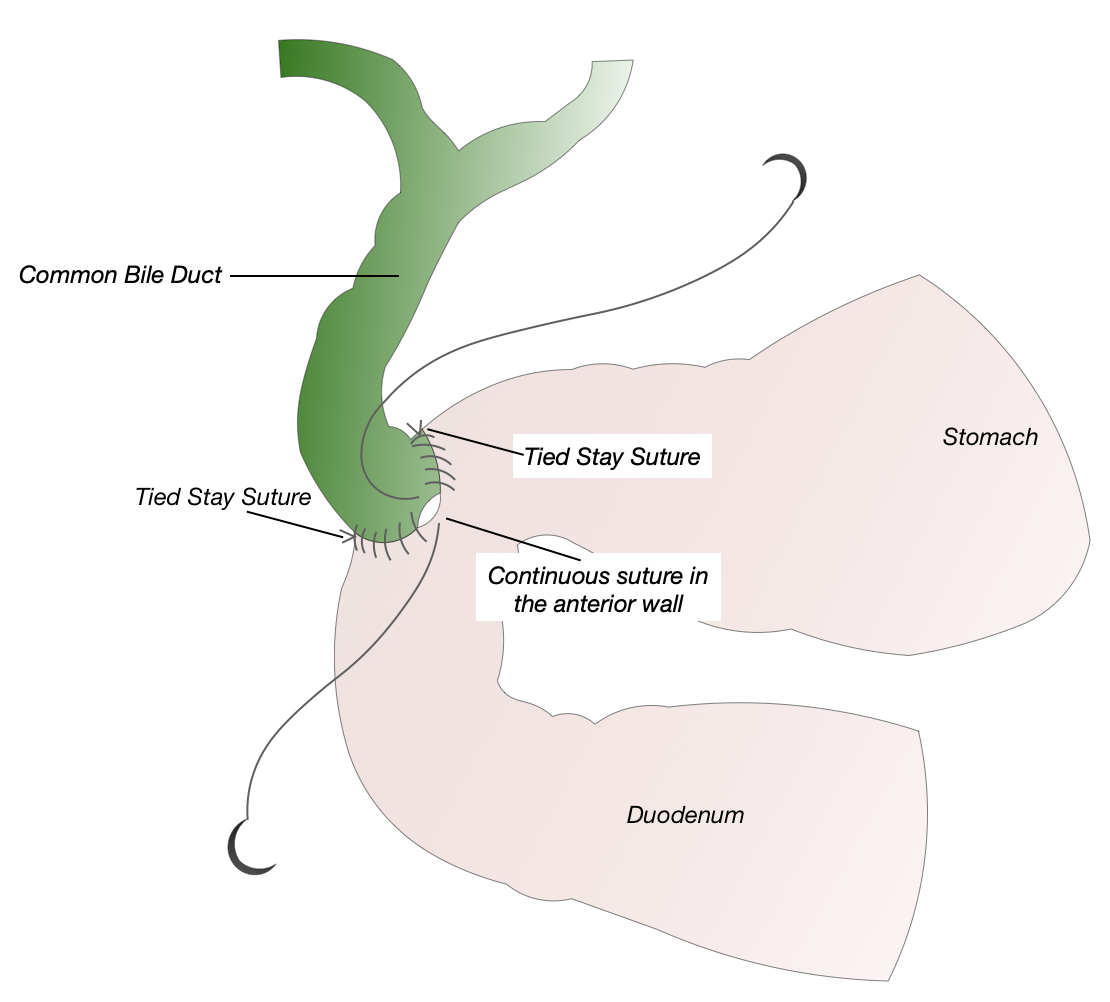
  Anterior Wall Anastomosis
9. 2 temporary sutures (stay-sutures) connecting the CBD and the duodenum incisions are placed at each corner of the anastomosis respectively. The sutures can be pulled to ensure the incisions made are fitting of one another, and anastomosis can occur without the presence of tension.
10. A continuous suture is performed, with the first suture beginning from the middle posterior position of the anastomosis. This suture will follow and run towards one corner of the anastomosis (where a stay-suture is located).
11. A second suture will also be performed from the middle posterior position, but running in the opposite direction of the first suture, to the other end of the anastomosis (where the other stay-suture is located).
12. The continuous suture loops are tightened by gently pulling at each end. To prevent anastomosis over-constriction, the 2 stay-sutures should also be tied. This marks the completion of the posterior wall anastomosis.
13. Suturing of the anterior wall of the anastomosis is achieved similarly to the posterior wall. Continuation of the 2 continuous sutures from each of their corners results in both sutures meeting at the middle anterior portion of the anastomosis.
14. The suture loops are then tightened and finished with at least 8 knots.
15. In both end-to-side and side-to-side CDD, the anastomosis should have a diameter of at least 14mm.

== Recovery ==
A closed suction drain is placed posterior to the CDD and left in place for usually a week. If the output is less than 40 cm^{3}/day, the drain is removed. It can be sent for a bilirubin and alkaline phosphatase test if there are concerns regarding the output. After the surgery, nasogastric suction is usually maintained for 2–3 days and the tube is removed when there is low output. Once the tube is in place, it can be used to give the patient food and medicine. A fluid diet is started after surgery and the diet is advanced as tolerated by the patient. Liver function tests should be restudied as needed during the postoperative recovery period. The average hospital stay ranges from 3–8 days but patients can be discharged as early as postoperative day 4.

== Risks and Complications ==
=== Short-term ===
==== Bile leakage ====
A CT scan or a fistulogram (an x-ray procedure used to investigate any abnormalities in the anastomosis) can be used to determine whether there is an increased bilirubin concentration within the intra-abdominal fluid. Given there is no blockage downstream of the anastomosis, most bile leakages will heal on their own.

=== Long-term ===
==== Cholangitis ====
Anastomotic stricture can lead to cholangitis, or inflammation of the bile duct. Narrowing of the bile duct leads to a buildup of pressure, causing the intercellular gaps to widen, exposing the cells to microorganisms found within the bile, resulting in inflammation. Symptoms include jaundice and pain in the upper right quadrant. A CT scan or an endoscopic retrograde cholangiopancreatography (ECRP) could be performed to determine the site of inflammation. Cholangiocarcinoma commonly occurs in patients with repeated episodes of cholangitis.

==== Anastomotic Stricture ====
Performing an anastomosis alters the structural composition of bile ducts, which can result in bile stricture obstruction. It leads to slowing of the biliary flow and dilation of the CBD, causing more progressive symptoms of jaundice. An anastomotic stricture is more likely to occur if the choledoctomy incision was less than 2 cm in length. The anastomosis could be enlarged by using endoscopic balloon dilation, which consists of inflating a balloon after it is placed in a stenosed region, as a means of widening the stenosed area.

==== Sump syndrome ====
Sump syndrome occurs when the nonfunctional portion of the distal CBD (between the site of anastomosis and the ampulla of Vater) acts as a site for stones or debris to gather.

The reported incidence of the sump syndrome is between 0.4% and 3.3%. Possible symptoms include pain, cholangitis, jaundice, and pancreatitis. Diagnosis and treatment can be carried out by an ERCP, where the accumulated debris identified in the blind end of the CBD is then extracted. Alternative treatment procedures include making an incision in the major duodenal papilla to enlarge the bile duct opening (biliary sphincterotomy).

== History ==
In 1888, a German surgeon named Bernhard Riedel performed the first CDD. He intended to cut across the CBD and implant the severed end into the duodenum; however, this idea was scrapped and he performed lateral anastomosis of the dilated CBD to the duodenum. The patient died due to infected bile leakage into the peritoneal cavity.

A German surgeon named Otto Sprengel reported the first recovery following CDD in 1891.

Following cholecystectomy and choledochotomy (a surgical incision of CBD), an American surgeon named W.J. Mayo reported successful treatment of CBD stricture. He sutured the end of the dilated portion of the CBD to the duodenum in 1905.
