= Webbed neck =

Clinical feature consisting of a congenital skin fold on the sides of the neck

- Other names: Pterygium colli deformity
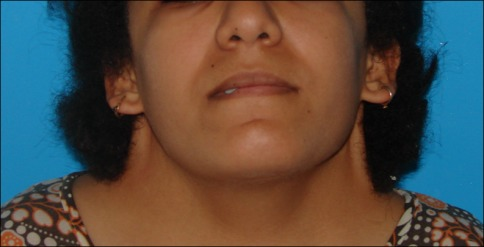
- Teenage girl with Turner syndrome and webbed neck
- Specialty: Medical genetics

A webbed neck, or pterygium colli, is a congenital skin fold that runs along the sides of the neck down to the shoulders. There are many variants.

== Signs and symptoms ==
On babies, webbed neck may look like loose folds of skin on the neck. As the child grows, the skin may stretch out to look like there is little or no fold.

=== Associated conditions ===
It is a feature of Turner syndrome (only found in girls) and Noonan syndrome, as well as the rarer Klippel–Feil syndrome, or Diamond–Blackfan anemia.
