= Indian hedgehog (protein) =

Protein-coding gene in the species Homo sapiens

IHH
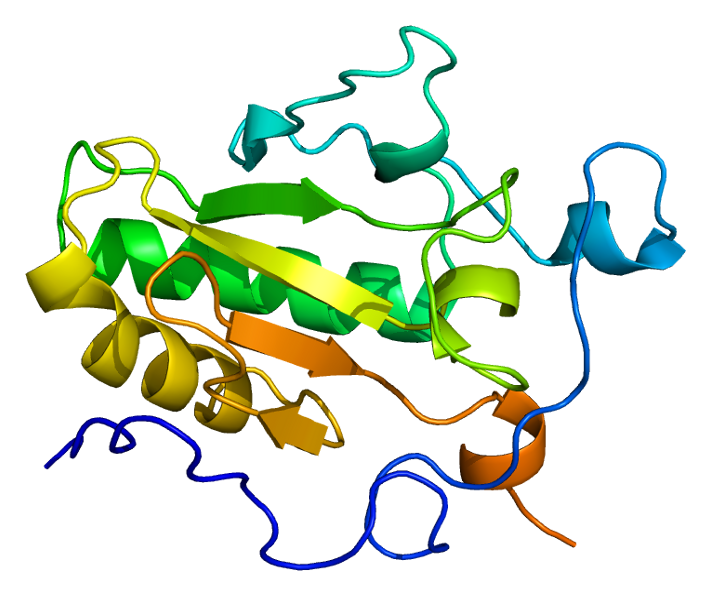

Identifiers
- Aliases: IHH, BDA1, HHG2, indian hedgehog, Indian hedgehog signaling molecule
- External IDs: OMIM: 600726; MGI: 96533; GeneCards: IHH
Available structures
| PDB | Ortholog search: PDBe RCSB |
| PDB | List of PDB id codes 3K7G, 3K7H, 3K7I, 3K7J, 3N1F, 3N1M, 3N1O, 3N1P |

Gene location (Human)
| Chr. | Chromosome 2 (human) |
| Band | 2q35 | Start | 219,054,424 bp |
| Band | 2q35 | End | 219,060,921 bp |

Gene location (Mouse)
| Chr. | Chromosome 1 (mouse) |
| Band | 1 C4|1 38.55 cM | Start | 74,984,474 bp |
| Band | 1 C4|1 38.55 cM | End | 74,990,831 bp |
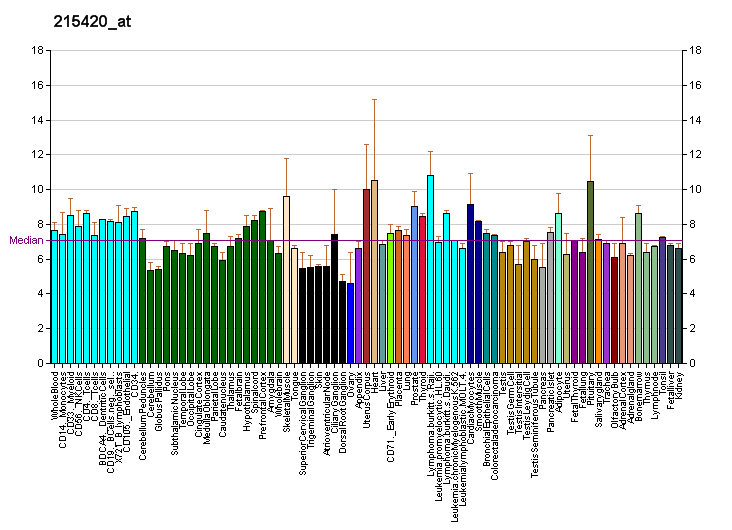
RNA expression pattern
| Bgee | Human / Mouse (ortholog); Top expressed in: mucosa of transverse colon; testicle; gonad; mucosa of ileum; tibia; rectum; mucosa of sigmoid colon; duodenum; jejunal mucosa; pylorus / Top expressed in: forearm; humerus; tibia; finger; epithelium of stomach; epiphyseal plate; yolk sac; left colon; ulna; pyloric antrum; More reference expression data |
| BioGPS | More reference expression data |
Gene ontology
| Molecular function | calcium ion binding; metal ion binding; peptidase activity; hydrolase activity; patched binding; protein binding |
| Cellular component | membrane; plasma membrane; extracellular region; extracellular space; extracellular matrix |
| Biological process | response to estradiol; maternal process involved in female pregnancy; positive regulation of epithelial cell proliferation; cell-cell signaling; negative regulation of apoptotic process; proteolysis; multicellular organism development; intein-mediated protein splicing; smoothened signaling pathway; positive regulation of transcription by RNA polymerase II; skeletal system development; ossification; branching involved in blood vessel morphogenesis; osteoblast differentiation; in utero embryonic development; cell fate specification; morphogenesis of a branching structure; vasculature development; heart looping; positive regulation of mesenchymal cell proliferation; epithelial cell morphogenesis; retinal pigment epithelium development; chondrocyte differentiation involved in endochondral bone morphogenesis; proteoglycan metabolic process; pattern specification process; positive regulation of cell population proliferation; embryonic pattern specification; cell differentiation; vitelline membrane formation; pancreas development; positive regulation of collagen biosynthetic process; negative regulation of T cell differentiation in thymus; negative regulation of immature T cell proliferation in thymus; positive regulation of T cell differentiation in thymus; multicellular organism growth; chondrocyte proliferation; regulation of growth; embryonic digit morphogenesis; camera-type eye development; bone resorption; negative regulation of cell differentiation; positive regulation of smoothened signaling pathway; positive regulation of alpha-beta T cell differentiation; negative regulation of alpha-beta T cell differentiation; negative regulation of eye pigmentation; cell maturation; embryonic digestive tract morphogenesis; embryonic camera-type eye morphogenesis; neuron development; smooth muscle tissue development; cartilage development; camera-type eye photoreceptor cell fate commitment; head morphogenesis; somite development; embryonic skeletal joint development; epithelial cell-cell adhesion; response to mechanical stimulus; liver regeneration; regulation of gene expression |
Sources:Amigo / QuickGO
Orthologs
| Databases | NCBI: entry; OMA: entry |
| Species | Human | Mouse |
| Entrez | 3549 | 16147 |
| Ensembl | ENSG00000163501 | ENSMUSG00000006538 |
| UniProt | Q14623 | P97812 |
| RefSeq (mRNA) | NM_002181 | NM_010544; NM_001313683 |
| RefSeq (protein) | NP_002172 | NP_001300612; NP_034674 |
| Location (UCSC) | Chr 2: 219.05 – 219.06 Mb | Chr 1: 74.98 – 74.99 Mb |
| PubMed search |
- Wikidata
| View/Edit Human | View/Edit Mouse |

Indian hedgehog homolog (Drosophila), also known as IHH, is a protein which in humans is encoded by the IHH gene. This cell signaling protein is in the hedgehog signaling pathway. The several mammalian variants of the Drosophila hedgehog gene (which was the first named) have been named after the various species of hedgehog; the Indian hedgehog is honored by this one. The gene is not specific to Indian hedgehogs.

== Function ==
The Indian hedgehog protein is one of three proteins in the mammalian hedgehog family, the others being desert hedgehog (DHH) and sonic hedgehog (SHH). It is involved in chondrocyte differentiation, proliferation and maturation especially during endochondral ossification. It regulates its effects by feedback control of parathyroid hormone-related peptide (PTHrP).

Indian Hedgehog (Ihh) is one of three signaling molecules from the Hedgehog (Hh) gene family. Genes of the Hh family, Sonic Hedgehog (Shh), Desert Hedgehog (Dhh) and Ihh regulate several fetal developmental processes. The Ihh homolog is involved in the formation of chondrocytes during the development of limbs. The protein is released by small, non-proliferating, mature chondrocytes during endochondral ossification. Recently, Ihh mutations are shown to cause brachydactyly type A1 (BDA1), the first Mendelian autosomal dominant disorder in humans to be recorded. There are seven known mutations to Ihh that cause BDA1. Of particular interest, are mutations involving the E95 residue, which is thought to be involved with proper signaling mechanisms between Ihh and its receptors. In a mouse model, mice with mutations to the E95 residue were found to have abnormalities to their digits.

Ihh may also be involved in endometrial cell differentiation and implantation. Studies have shown progesterone to upregulate Ihh expression in the murine endometrium, suggesting a role in implantation. Ihh is suspected to be involved in the downstream regulation of other signaling molecules that are known to play a role in murine implantation. Mouse models involving Ihh null mice demonstrated failure of attachment and decidualization.
