= Sprengel's deformity =

Congenital abnormality involving a single higher shoulder blade

- Other names: Sprengel deformity, Sprengel's shoulder, Sprengel shoulder, high scapula
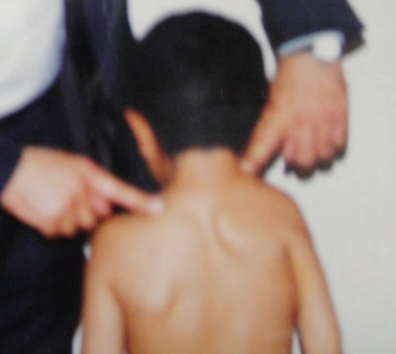
- Sprengel's deformity, showing a higher right-sided shoulder blade
- Specialty: Medical genetics
- Types: Muscular forms

Sprengel's deformity (also known as high scapula, scapular hypoplasia, or congenital high scapula) is a rare congenital skeletal abnormality where a person has one shoulder blade that sits higher on the back than the other. The deformity is due to a failure in early fetal development, where the shoulder fails to descend properly from the neck to its final position. The majority of cases are sporadic, with very few having autosomal dominant inheritance.

The deformity is associated with the following conditions:

- Klippel–Feil syndrome (most common)
- congenital scoliosis,
- hemivertebrae,
- cervical ribs, ⁣
- fused ribs,
- omovertebral connections which are fibrous, cartilaginous or bony connection between the superomedial angle of scapula with the spinous process, lamina or transverse process of cervical spine
- spina bifida,
- cleft palate.

The left shoulder is more commonly affected, but it can occur bilaterally as well.

About 75% of all observed cases are girls. Treatment includes surgery in early childhood and physical therapy. Surgical treatment in adulthood is complicated by the risk of nerve damage when removing the omovertebral bone and when stretching the muscle tissue during relocation of the shoulder.

== Presentation ==
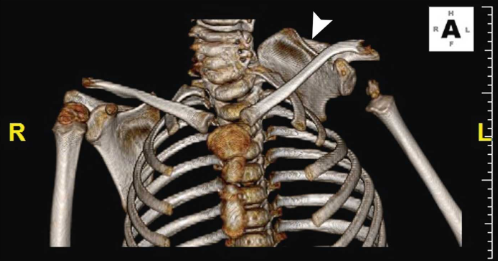
CT scan showing Sprengel's deformity of the left side (arrow) and fused cervical vertebrae, as seen in Klippel–Feil syndrome

The scapula is small and rotated so that its inferior edge points toward the spine. Sometimes a bony connection is present between the elevated scapula and one of the cervical vertebrae, usually C5 or C6. This connection is known as an omovertebral bone.

There is a high correlation between Sprengel's deformity and Klippel–Feil syndrome.

== Diagnosis ==
Most cases of Sprengel's deformity are sporadic but very few are inherited in an autosomal dominant manner.

Diagnosis is clinical and can be confirmed by instrumental diagnostics like conventional radiography and CT scan. It may be indicated to perform a genetic analysis, as the deformity may occur under other conditions (see Klippel–Feil syndrome).

== Eponym ==
It is named for German surgeon Otto Sprengel, who described it in 1891.
