= Srb's anomaly =

Congenital fusion of the first and second ribs

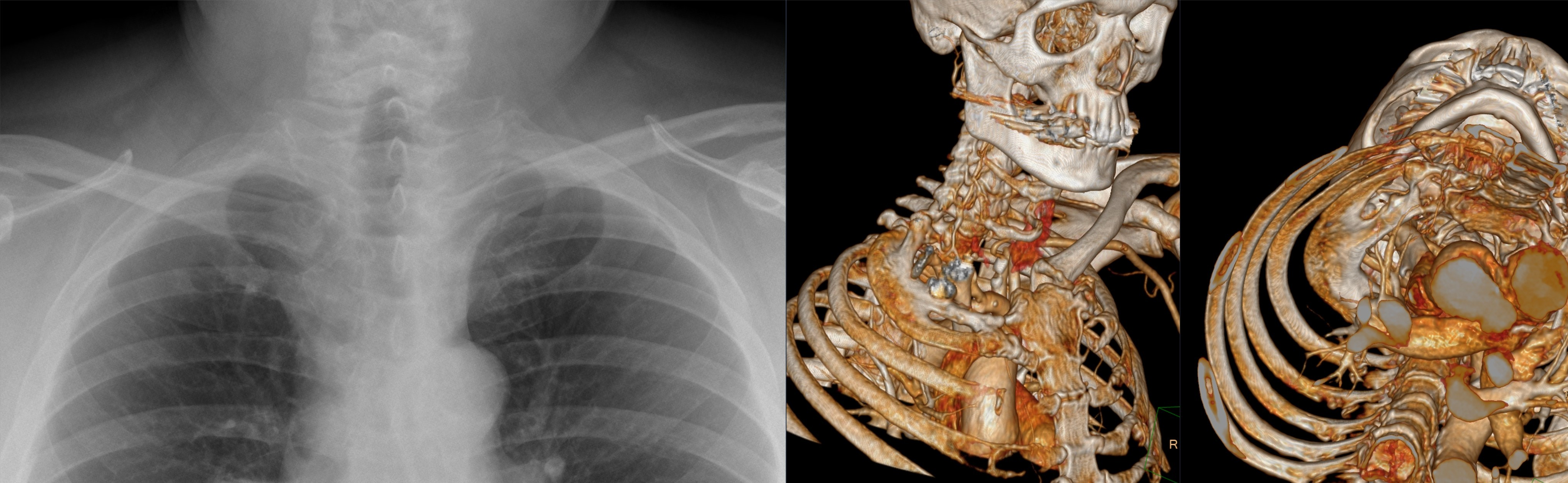
- Srb's anomaly. X-ray and CT scan as volumen rendering
- Differential diagnosis: Klippel–Feil syndrome

Srb's anomaly is the clinical condition describing synostosis, or fusion, between the first and second ribs. It may be either a partial or complete fusion between the two ribs to create an entirely indistinguishable new rib.

Srb's anomaly is commonly seen in people with Klippel–Feil syndrome.
