= Arisleyda Dilone =

American actress

- Occupations: Director, actress and writer
- Years active: 2015–present

Arisleyda Dilone is a director and actress. She is best known for her work on the documentary films Mami y Yo y mi Gallito and Two White Cars.

== Life and career ==
Arisleyda was born in Santiago de los Caballeros, Dominican Republic and now lives in New York City. Her directorial debut documentary film Mami y Yo y mi Gallito screened at Harvard University. In 2015, she was awarded Astraea Intersex Fund for her documentary work. In 2018, she won fellowship from MacDowell Colony. She is intersex and has intersex variation XY gonadal dysgenesis.

== Filmography ==
Year	Film	Writer	Director	Actress	Notes
2018	Two White Cars	✗	✓	✗	Documentary
2017	Special Election	✗	✗	✓	Short film
2015	Mami y Yo y mi Gallito	✓	✓	✗	Documentary
