= Gonadoblastoma =

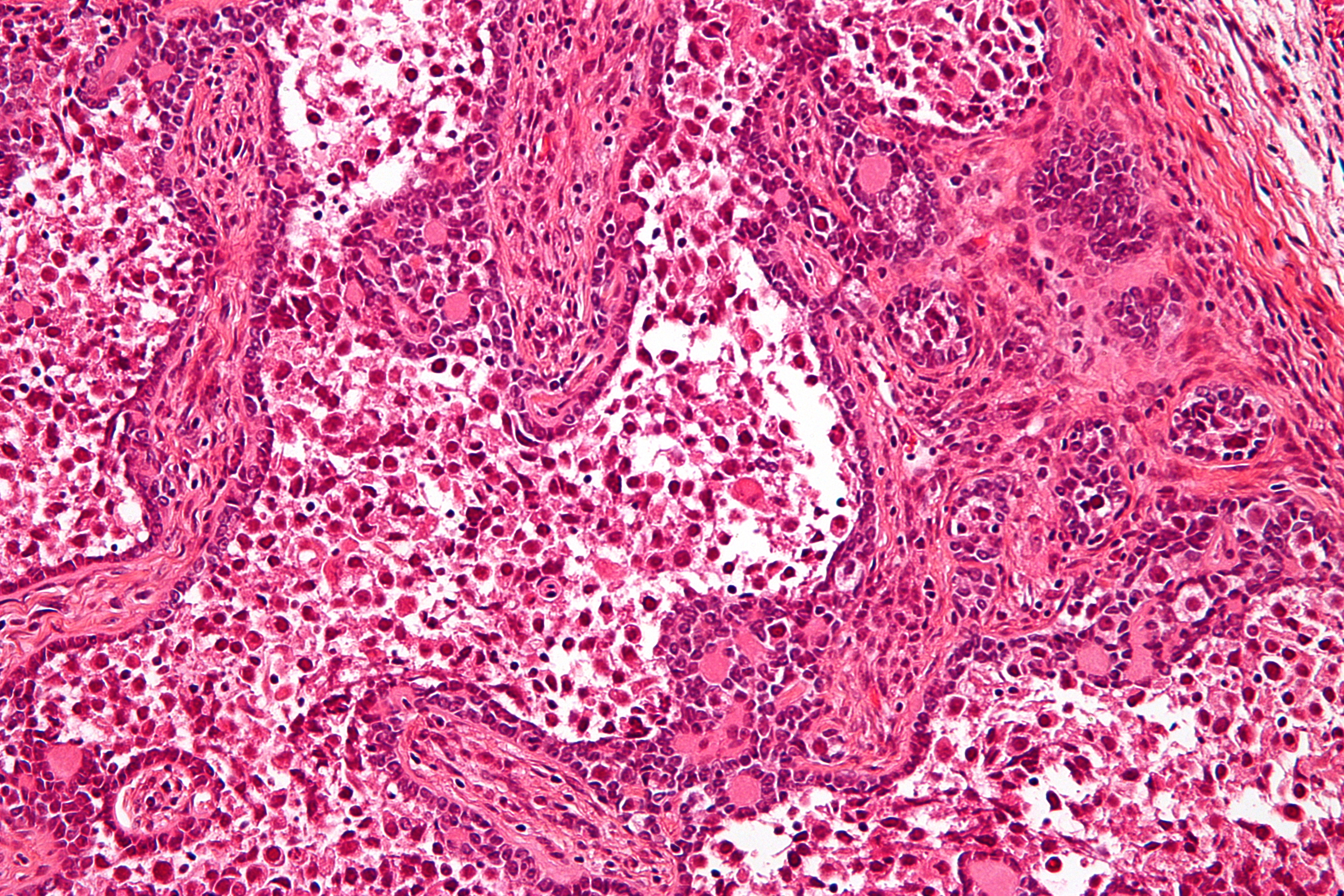
- Micrograph of a gonadoblastoma. H&E stain.
- Specialty: Urology, oncology

A gonadoblastoma is a complex neoplasm composed of a mixture of gonadal elements, such as large primordial germ cells, immature Sertoli cells or granulosa cells of the sex cord, and gonadal stromal cells. Gonadoblastomas are by definition benign, but more than 50% have a co-existing dysgerminoma which is malignant, and an additional 10% have other more aggressive malignancies, and as such are often treated as malignant.

== Risk factors ==
Gonadoblastoma is most often associated with an abnormal chromosomal karyotype, gonadal dysgenesis, or the presence of a Y chromosome in over 90% of cases. Gonadoblastoma has been found in association with androgen insensitivity syndrome, mixed gonadal dysgenesis and Turner syndrome, especially in the presence of Y chromosome-bearing cells. Women with Turner syndrome whose karyotype includes a Y chromosome (as in 45,X/46,XY mosaicism) are at increased risk for gonadoblastoma. Because of the risk of gonadoblastoma, individuals with Turner syndrome with detectable Y chromosome material (Mosaic Turner syndrome) should have their gonads prophylactically removed. In a population-based study, the cumulative risk for women with Turner syndrome and Y chromosome material was 7.9 percent by age 25 years.

== Diagnosis ==
=== Classification ===
Gonadoblastomas can contain elements of both germ cells and gonadal stroma.

Formerly, gonadoblastoma was sometimes regarded as a subset of dysgerminoma. In modern literature, it is sometimes considered to progress to dysgerminoma.

== Treatment ==
Standard treatment would include surgical exploration via laparotomy. Laparoscopy may be an option if the surgeon is particularly skilled in removing ovarian neoplasms via laparoscopy intact. If the diagnosis of gonadoblastoma is certain, a bilateral salpingo-oophorectomy (BSO) should be performed to remove both the primary tumor and the dysgenic contralateral ovary. If uninvolved, the uterus should be left intact. Modern reproductive endocrinology technology allows patients post BSO to achieve pregnancy via in-vitro fertilization (IVF) with a donor egg.
