= Đa Bút culture =

The Đa Bút culture (5000–1000 BCE) is the name given to a period of the early Neolithic Age in Vietnam, after the name of the site in Vĩnh Lộc district. The Đa Bút site was excavated in the 1930s by fr:Étienne Patte, and is a Neolithic cemetery distinguished by shell middens. The site has recently been carbon-dated to 5000 BC. The people at the site were hunter-gatherers, and fishermen, with evidence of farming both of livestock and paddy rice. Other studies have given the site a slightly later date and found no evidence of food production.

The site is relevant to the two-layer hypothesis, as it is earliest culture in the region to the post-date the Hoabinhian culture, and therefore mark the beginning of the second layer.

== See also ==
- Two layer hypothesis
