= Gonadal dysgenesis =

Congenital disorder of the reproductive system

- Specialty: Medical genetics
- Diagnostic method: pelvic examination (checking for maturation of external internal genitals), general examination (looking for secondary sexual characters), chromosome karyotyping, hormone levels like FSH, LH (which are increased in case of purely XX dysgenesis), family history
- Treatment: surgery

Gonadal dysgenesis is classified as any congenital developmental disorder of the reproductive system characterized by a progressive loss of primordial germ cells on the developing gonads of an embryo. One type of gonadal dysgenesis is the development of functionless, fibrous tissue, termed streak gonads, instead of reproductive tissue. Streak gonads are a form of aplasia, resulting in hormonal failure that manifests as sexual infantism and infertility, with no initiation of puberty and secondary sex characteristics.

Gonadal development is a process, which is primarily controlled genetically by the chromosomal sex (XX or XY), which directs the formation of the gonad (ovary or testicle).

Differentiation of the gonads requires a tightly regulated cascade of genetic, molecular and morphogenic events. At the formation of the developed gonad, steroid production influences local and distant receptors for continued morphological and biochemical changes. This results in the phenotype corresponding to the karyotype (46,XX for females and 46,XY for males).

Gonadal dysgenesis arises from a difference in signalling in this tightly regulated process during early foetal development.

Manifestations of gonadal dysgenesis are dependent on the aetiology and severity of the underlying causes.

== Causes ==
- Pure gonadal dysgenesis 46,XX also known as XX gonadal dysgenesis
- Pure gonadal dysgenesis 46,XY also known as XY gonadal dysgenesis
- Mixed gonadal dysgenesis also known as partial gonadal dysgenesis, and 45,X/46,XY mosaicism
- Turner syndrome also known as 45,X or 45,X0
- Endocrine disruptions

== Pathogenesis ==
=== 46,XX gonadal dysgenesis ===
46,XX gonadal dysgenesis is characteristic of female hypogonadism with a karyotype of 46,XX. Streak ovaries are present with non-functional tissues unable to produce the required sex steroid oestrogen. Low levels of oestrogen effect the HPG axis with no feedback to the anterior pituitary to inhibit the secretion of FSH and LH.

FSH and LH are secreted at elevated levels. Increased levels of these hormones will cause the body to not start puberty, not undergo menarche, and not develop secondary sex characteristics. If ovarian tissue is present and produces some amount of hormones, limited menstrual cycles can occur.

46,XX gonadal dysgenesis can manifest from a variety of causes. Interruption during ovarian development in embryogenesis can cause 46,XX gonadal dysgenesis with cases of changes in the FSH receptor and mutations in steroidogenic acute regulatory protein (StAR protein) which regulates steroid hormone production.

=== 46,XY gonadal dysgenesis ===
46,XY gonadal dysgenesis is characteristic of male hypogonadism with karyotype 46,XY. In embryogenesis, the development of the male gonads is primarily controlled by the testis determining factor located on the sex-determining region of the Y chromosome (SRY). The male gonad is dependent on SRY and the signalling pathways initiated to several other genes to facilitate testis development.

46,XY gonadal dysgenesis can be caused by mutations in the genes involved in testis development such as SRY, SOX9, WT1, SF1, and DHH. If a single or combination of these genes are mutated or deleted, downstream signalling is disrupted, leading to atypical penis and scrotum.

Genital Undermasculinization is the technical term for partial or complete undifferentiated genitallia in individuals with an SRY gene. In utero, all fetuses are anatomically undifferentiated which are then differentiated via androgen's and SRY activation.

Full undermasculinization results in a fully developed vulva with testicles inside the body where the ovaries usually are, which is caused by conditions such as complete androgen insensitivity syndrome. In 5α-Reductase 2 deficiency, individuals are born with normal female genitalia, however, during puberty, male differentiation and spermatogenesis occurs. Partial genital undermasculinization can occur if the body has a partial resistance to androgens, or if genital development is blocked, undermasculization can also be induced by certain drugs and hormones. The overall intensity of undermasculinization can manifest itself in hypospadias. The surgical assignment of newborns with ambiguous genitalia to a binary sex for cosmetic purposes is considered a human rights violation.

SRY acts on gene SOX9 which drives Sertoli cell formation and testis differentiation. An absence in SRY causes SOX9 to not be expressed at the usual time or concentration, leading to a decreased testosterone and anti-Müllerian hormone production.

Lowered levels of testosterone and anti-Müllerian hormone disrupts the development of Wolffian ducts and internal genitalia that are key to male reproductive tract development. The absence of the steroid hormones commonly associated with males drives Müllerian duct development and promotes the development of female genitalia, if anti-Müllerian hormone is suppressed or the body is insensitive, persistent Müllerian duct syndrome occurs when the individual has partial female reproductive, and partial male reproductive organs.

Gonadal streaks can replace the tissues of testes, resembling ovarian stroma absent of follicles. 46,XY gonadal dysgenesis can remain unsuspected until delayed pubertal development is observed. Approximately 15% of cases of 46,XY gonadal dysgenesis carry de novo mutations in the SRY gene, with an unknown causation for the remaining portion of 46,XY gonadal dysgenesis persons.

=== Mixed gonadal dysgenesis ===
Mixed gonadal dysgenesis, also known as X0/XY mosaicism or partial gonadal dysgenesis, is a sex development difference associated with sex chromosome aneuploidy and mosaicism of the Y chromosome. Mixed gonadal dysgenesis is the presence of two or more germ line cells.

The degree of development of the male reproductive tract is determined by the ratio of germ line cells expressing the XY genotype.

Manifestations of mixed gonadal dysgenesis are highly variable with asymmetry in gonadal development of testis and streak gonad, accounted for by the percentage of cells expressing XY genotype.

The dysgenic testis can have an amount of functional tissue which can produce a level of testosterone, which causes masculinisation.

Mixed gonadal dysgenesis is poorly understood at the molecular level. The loss of the Y chromosome can occur from deletions, translocations, or migration diffenernce of paired chromosomes during cell division. The chromosomal loss results in partial expression of the SRY gene, giving rise to atypical development of the reproductive tract and altered hormone levels.

=== Turner syndrome ===
Turner syndrome, also known as 45,X or 45,X0, is a chromosomal abnormality characterised by a partial or completely missing second X chromosome, giving a chromosomal count of 45, instead of the typical count of 46 chromosomes.

Dysregulation in meiosis signalling to germ cells during embryogenesis may result in nondisjunction and monosomy X from not occurred separation of chromosomes in either the parental gamete or during early embryonic divisions.

The aetiology of Turner syndrome phenotype can be the result of haploinsufficiency, where a portion of critical genes are rendered inactive during embryogenesis. Normal ovarian development requires these vital regions of the X chromosome that are inactivated. Clinical manifestation include primary amenorrhea, hypergonadotropic hypogonadism, streak gonads, infertility, and failure to develop secondary sex characteristics. Turner syndrome is usually not diagnosed until a delayed onset of puberty with Müllerian structures found to be in infantile stage. Physical phenotypic characteristics include short stature, dysmorphic features and lymphedema at birth. Comorbidities include heart defects, vision and hearing problems, diabetes, and low thyroid hormone production.

=== Endocrine disruptions ===
Endocrine disruptors interfere with the endocrine system and hormones. Hormones are critical for the common events in embryogenesis to occur. Foetal development relies on the proper timing of the delivery of hormones for cellular differentiation and maturation. Disruptions can cause sexual development disorders leading to gonadal dysgenesis.

== History ==
Turner syndrome was first described independently by Otto Ulrich in 1930 and Henry Turner in 1938. 46,XX pure gonadal dysgenesis was first reported in 1960. 46,XY pure gonadal dysgenesis, also known as Swyer syndrome, was first described by Gim Swyer in 1955.

== See also ==
- (DoDI) 6130.03, 2018, section 5, 13f and 14m
- Ovotestis
- 46 XX
