= 45,X/46,XY mosaicism =

- Other names: 45,X0/46,XY MGD
- Specialty: Obstetrics and gynaecology, endocrinology, medical genetics

45,X/46,XY mosaicism, also known as X0/XY mosaicism and mixed gonadal dysgenesis, is a mutation of sex development in humans associated with sex chromosome aneuploidy and mosaicism of the Y chromosome. It is a fairly rare chromosomal disorder at birth, with an estimated incidence rate of about 1 in 15,000 live births. Mosaic loss of the Y chromosome in previously non-mosaic men grows increasingly common with age.

The clinical manifestations are highly variable, ranging from partial virilisation and ambiguous genitalia at birth, to patients with completely male or female gonads. Most individuals with this karyotype have apparently normal male genitalia, and a minority have female genitalia, with a significant number of individuals showing genital abnormalities or mixed sex characteristics. A significantly higher than average number of other developmental abnormalities are also found in individuals with X0/XY mosaicism. Psychomotor development is normal.

== Signs and symptoms ==
Conditions can be distinguished histologically and by karyotyping. The observable characteristics (phenotype) of this condition are highly variable, ranging from gonadal dysgenesis in males, to Turner-like females and phenotypically normal males. The phenotypical expression may be ambiguous, male or female, regardless of the extent of the mosaicism. The most common presentation of 45,X/46,XY karyotype is phenotypically normal male, next being genital ambiguity.

There is a range of chromosomal anomalies within 45,X/46,XY where the variations are very complex, and the actual result in living individuals is often not a simple picture. Most patients with this karyotype are known to have abnormal gonadal histology and heights considerably below their genetic potential. High gonadotropin levels have been described in both male and female patients, as well as low levels of testosterone in male patients. Dosage loss of SHOX gene is commonly associated with short stature. Psychomotor development is normal.

As the gonads may not be symmetrical, the development of the Müllerian duct and Wolffian duct may be asymmetrical, too. Because of the presence of dysgenetic gonadal tissue and Y chromosome material, there is a high risk of the development of a gonadoblastoma.

== Causes ==
In a normal situation, all the cells in an individual will have 46 chromosomes, with one being an X and one a Y or with two Xs. However, sometimes during the early copying processes of DNA replication and cell division, one chromosome can be lost. In 45,X/46,XY, most or all of the Y chromosome is lost in one of the newly created cells. All the cells then made from this cell will lack the Y chromosome. All the cells created from the cells that have not lost the Y chromosome will be XY. The 46,XY cells will continue to multiply at the same time as the 45,X cells multiply. The embryo, then the fetus, and then eventually the baby will have what is known as a 45,X/46,XY constitution.

There are many chromosomal variations that cause the 45,X/46,XY karyotype, including malformation (isodicentricism) of the Y chromosomes, deletions of Y chromosome or translocations of Y chromosome segments. Such rearrangements of the Y chromosome can lead to partial expression of the SRY gene which may lead to abnormal genitals and testosterone levels.

== Diagnosis ==
Identification of 45,X/46,XY karyotype has significant clinical implications due to known effects on growth, hormonal balance, gonadal development and histology. 45,X/46,XY is diagnosed by examining the chromosomes in a blood sample.

The age of diagnosis varies depending on manifestations of disease prompting reason for cytogenetic testing. Many patients are diagnosed prenatally due to fetal factors (increased nuchal fold, or abnormal levels of serum), maternal age or abnormal ultrasounds, while others will be diagnosed postnatal due to external genital malformation. It is not uncommon for patients to be diagnosed later in life due to short stature or delayed puberty, or a combination of both.

45,X/46,XY mosaicism can be detected prenatally through amniocentesis however, it was determined that the proportion of 45,X cells in the amniotic fluid cannot predict any phenotypic outcomes, often making prenatal genetic counselling difficult.

== See also ==
- Sex chromosome anomalies
- Gonadal dysgenesis
- Mosaic (genetics)
- Turner syndrome
