= Henry Turner (endocrinologist) =

American endocrinologist (1892–1970)

Henry H. Turner
- Born: August 28, 1892; Harrisburg, Illinois, US
- Died: August 4, 1970 (aged 77); Oklahoma City, Oklahoma, US
- Education: University of Louisville School of Medicine
- Occupation: Endocrinologist
- Employer: University of Oklahoma College of Medicine
- Known for: First description of Turner syndrome
- Title: Chief of Endocrinology, Associate Dean
- Spouse: Frances Bulkley
- Children: 2

Henry Hubert Turner (August 28, 1892 – August 4, 1970) was an American endocrinologist, noted for his published description of Turner syndrome in 1938 at the annual meeting of the Association for the Study of Internal Secretions. He served as chief of endocrinology and as associate dean of the University of Oklahoma College of Medicine from 1924.

Turner was born in Harrisburg, Illinois. He received his medical education at the University of Louisville School of Medicine, graduating in 1921. He died in Oklahoma City, Oklahoma, in 1970, aged 77.
