= Otto Sprengel =

German surgeon

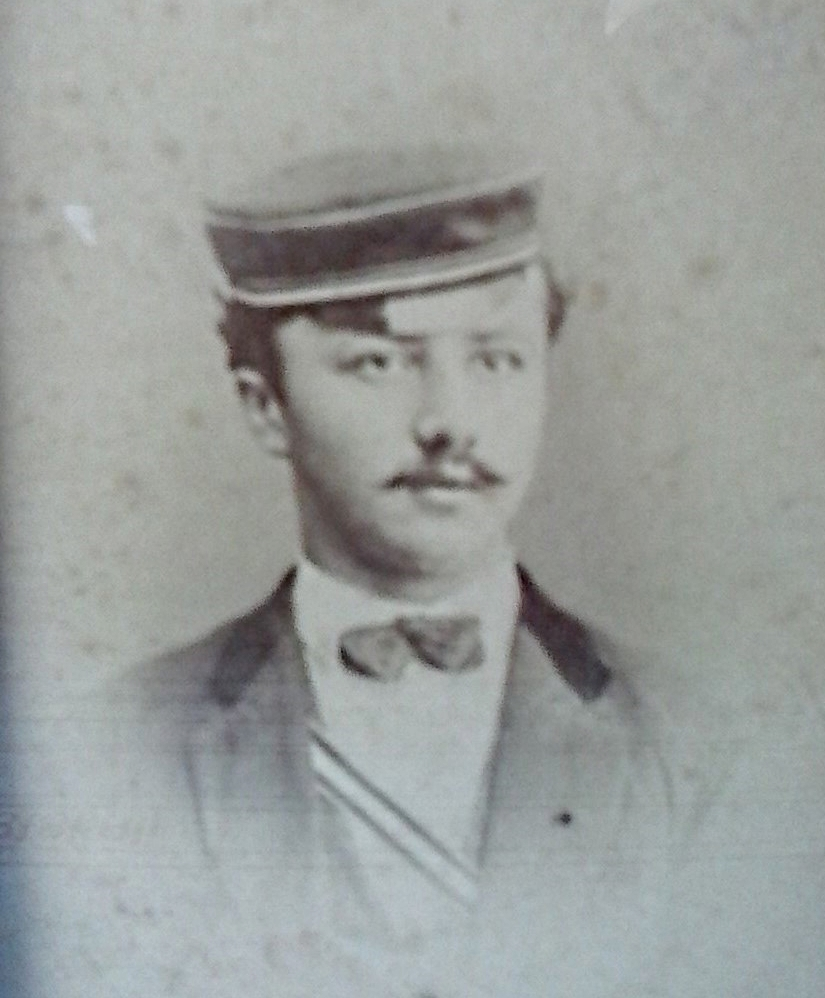
Otto Sprengel as a member of Corps Borussia Tübingen

Otto Gerhard Karl Sprengel (27 December 1852, in Waren an der Müritz – 8 January 1915, in Berlin) was a German surgeon.

He studied medicine at the University of Tübingen, the Ludwig-Maximilians-Universität München, and the University of Rostock, receiving his doctorate at Marburg University in 1877. At Marburg University, he worked as an assistant to surgeon Wilhelm Roser, then afterwards, spent three years as an assistant to Richard von Volkmann at the University of Halle. After practicing medicine for a short period of time in Frankfurt am Main, he was named senior physician at the children's hospital in Dresden (1882). In 1896, he relocated to the hospital in Braunschweig as head of its surgical department. He was elected president of the Deutsche Gesellschaft für Chirurgie, but died soon afterwards of sepsis, contracted when operating on a patient with a gunshot wound.

He was especially interested in abdominal surgery, and introduced a transverse sub-umbilical incision referred to as "Sprengel's incision". In 1891, he described a congenital disorder affecting the scapula that is now known as "Sprengel's deformity". He described the condition in a paper titled Die angeborene Verschiebung des Schulterblattes nach oben ("The congenital upward displacement of the scapula").

His book Appendicitis (1906) was later translated into English. Another noted work by Sprengel was Über den Begriff 'Bruchanlage' in der Praxis (1909).
