= Dysgenesis (embryology) =

Abnormal organ development during embryonic growth

Dysgenesis is an abnormal organ development during embryonic growth and development. As opposed to agenesis, which refers to the complete failure of an organ to develop, dysgenesis usually implies disordered development or malformation and in some cases represents the milder end of a spectrum of abnormalities. Dysgenesis occurs during fetal development immediately after conception.

== Classification ==
One of the first organs that is affected is the brain, this is known as cerebral dysgenesis. Dysplasia is a form of dysgenesis in adults that alters the size and shape of their cells that lead to abnormal development. One of the most common forms of dysgenesis is within the gonads.

Examples:

- Gonadal dysgenesis
- Adrenal dysgenesis
- Thyroid dysgenesis
- Anterior segment dysgenesis
