= Desert hedgehog (protein) =

Protein-coding gene in the species Homo sapiens

DHH
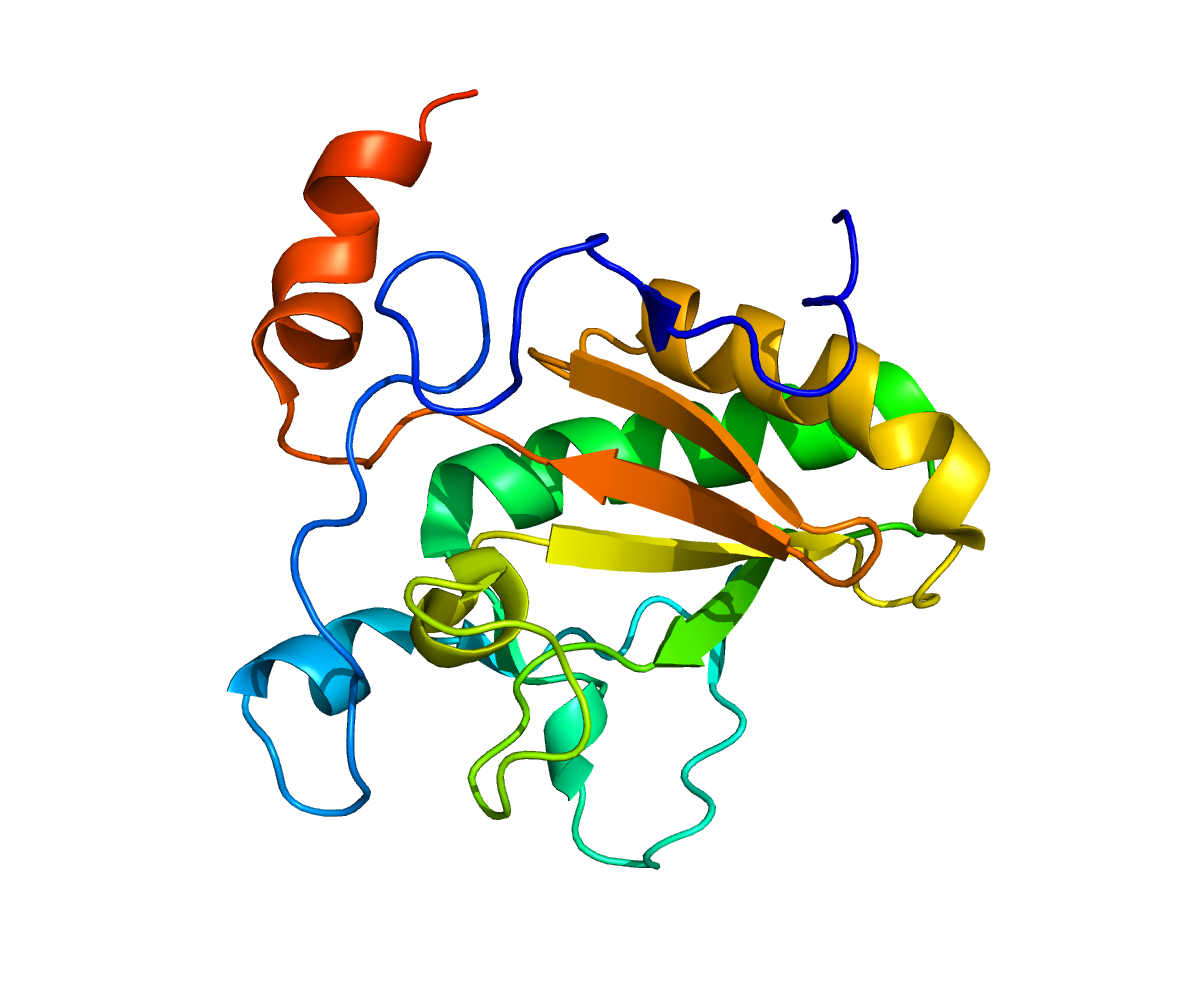

Identifiers
- Aliases: DHH, GDXYM, HHG-3, SRXY7, C78960, desert hedgehog, desert hedgehog signaling molecule, GDMN
- External IDs: OMIM: 605423; MGI: 94891; GeneCards: DHH
Available structures
PDB	Ortholog search: PDBe RCSB
PDB	List of PDB id codes 2WFQ, 2WFR, 2WG3, 3N1G, 3N1Q

Gene location (Human)
Chr.	Chromosome 12 (human)
Band	12q13.12	Start	49,086,656 bp
Band	12q13.12	End	49,094,801 bp

Gene location (Mouse)
Chr.	Chromosome 15 (mouse)
Band	15 F1|15 55.05 cM	Start	98,789,033 bp
Band	15 F1|15 55.05 cM	End	98,796,421 bp
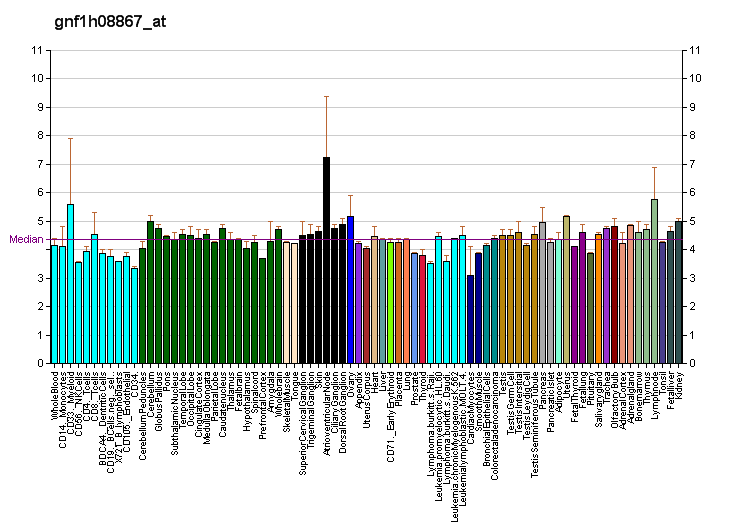
RNA expression pattern
Bgee	Human / Mouse (ortholog); Top expressed in: tibial nerve; right testis; left testis; sural nerve; smooth muscle tissue; spinal ganglia; left coronary artery; appendix; right coronary artery; muscle of thigh / Top expressed in: sciatic nerve; epithelium of seminiferous tubule of testis; Sertoli cell; external carotid artery; Gonadal ridge; lumbar spinal ganglion; internal carotid artery; utricle; pulmonary artery; Ileal epithelium; More reference expression data
BioGPS	More reference expression data
Gene ontology
Molecular function	calcium ion binding; zinc ion binding; metal ion binding; patched binding; peptidase activity; protein binding; hydrolase activity
Cellular component	membrane; plasma membrane; extracellular region; extracellular space
Biological process	response to estradiol; Leydig cell differentiation; cell-cell signaling; regulation of steroid biosynthetic process; male sex determination; proteolysis; response to estrogen; multicellular organism development; spermatid development; myelination; osteoblast differentiation; smoothened signaling pathway; cell fate specification; regulation of gene expression
Sources:Amigo / QuickGO
Orthologs
Databases	NCBI: entry; OMA: entry
Species	Human	Mouse
Entrez	50846	13363
Ensembl	ENSG00000139549	ENSMUSG00000023000
UniProt	O43323	Q61488
RefSeq (mRNA)	NM_021044	NM_007857
RefSeq (protein)	NP_066382	NP_031883
Location (UCSC)	Chr 12: 49.09 – 49.09 Mb	Chr 15: 98.79 – 98.8 Mb
PubMed search
- Wikidata
View/Edit Human	View/Edit Mouse

Desert hedgehog, also Desert hedgehog homolog or DHh, is a protein encoded by the DHH gene, and is a member of the hedgehog signaling pathway. The human homolog (DHH) is on chromosome band 12q13.1. The protein encoded by this gene is involved in cell signaling. The several mammalian variants of the Drosophila hedgehog gene (which was the first named) have been named after the various species of hedgehog; the desert hedgehog is honored by this one. The gene is not specific to desert hedgehogs. The Desert Hedgehog gene has been identified in both humans and mouse models.

== Function ==
This gene encodes a member of the hedgehog family. The hedgehog gene family encodes signaling molecules that play an important role in regulating morphogenesis. This protein is predicted to be made as a precursor that is autocatalytically cleaved; the N-terminal portion is soluble and contains the signalling activity while the C-terminal portion is involved in precursor processing. More importantly, the C-terminal product covalently attaches a cholesterol moiety to the N-terminal product, restricting the N-terminal product to the cell surface and preventing it from freely diffusing throughout the organism.

The hedgehog signaling pathway allows for signal transmission between cell membranes and the nucleus. While Dhh is mostly inactive in adults, this gene plays an important role in embryonic development. While Drosophila, the species this gene was discovered in, has only been shown to have one Hedgehog gene, three different genes in the Hedgehog family have been identified in vertebrates. These genes are Sonic Hedgehog (SHh), Indian Hedgehog (IHh), and Desert Hedgehog (DHh).

The expression of DHh is mostly limited to the gonadal cells. More specifically, this gene is commonly identified within the Sertoli cells of the testes. This gene plays a large role in the cell differentiation within these germ cells.

== Clinical significance ==
Defects in this protein have been associated with partial gonadal dysgenesis (PGD) accompanied by minifascicular polyneuropathy. This protein may be involved in both male gonadal differentiation and perineurial development.

The presence of DHh in sertoli cells allows for proper testicular development and differentiation of the germ cells within the testes. Blocking the DHh signaling throughout testes development results in disrupted spermatogenesis along with infertility. Mutations in DHh expression result in infertility, likely due to the blockage of the cell differentiation process.

== Animal models ==
Mouse models show very serious effects are a result of both a repression and an overexpression of DHh. Mutant mice with a DHh expression deficiency show malformations and growth restriction in the Central Nervous System, skeletal, limb, and craniofacial structural development. Additionally, persistent high levels of DHh expression have been connected with tumor development in organ tissues of postnatal mice.
