= Duplicated ureter =

Physical anomaly

Duplicated ureter

Duplicated ureter or duplex collecting system is a congenital condition in which the ureteric bud, the embryological origin of the ureter, splits (or arises twice), resulting in two ureters draining a single kidney. It is the most common renal abnormality, occurring in approximately 1% of the population.

== Pathophysiology ==
Ureteral development begins in the human fetus around the 4th week of embryonic development. A ureteric bud, arising from the mesonephric (or Wolffian) duct, gives rise to the ureter, as well as other parts of the collective system. In the case of a duplicated ureter, the ureteric bud either splits or arises twice. In most cases, the kidney is divided into two parts, an upper and lower lobe, with some overlap due to intermingling of collecting tubules. However, in some cases the division is so complete as to give rise to two separate parts, each with its own renal pelvis and ureter.

== Diagnosis ==
Prenatally diagnosed hydronephrosis (fluid-filled kidneys) suggest post-natal follow-up examination. The strongest neo-natal presentation is urinary tract infection. A hydronephrotic kidney may present as a palpable abdominal mass in the newborn, and may suggest an ectopic ureter or ureterocele. In older children, ureteral duplication may present as:

- Urinary tract infection – most commonly due to vesicoureteral reflux (flow of urine from the bladder into the ureter, rather than vice versa).
- Urinary incontinence in females occurs in cases of ectopic ureter entering the vagina, urethra or vestibule.

=== Classification ===
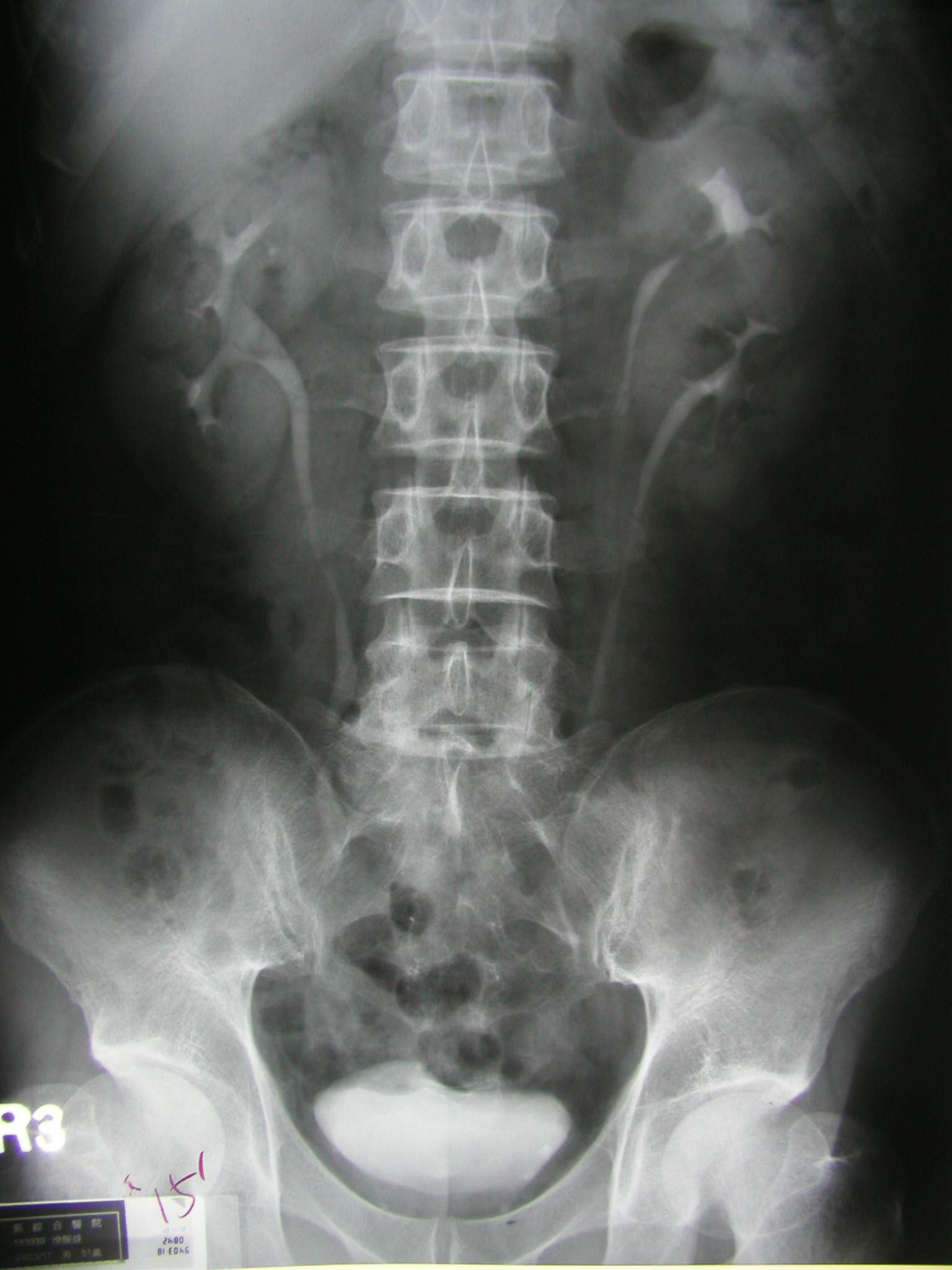
One of a series of IVP films at 15 minutes after injection of contrast medium showed incomplete duplication of left collecting system.

Ureteral duplication is either of:

Partial
I.e., the two ureters drain into the bladder via a single common ureter. Partial, or incomplete, ureteral duplication is rarely clinically significant.
Complete
In which the two ureters drain separately. Complete ureteral duplication may result in one ureter opening normally into the bladder, and the other being ectopic, ending in the vagina, the urethra or the vulval vestibule. These cases occur when the ureteric bud arises twice (rather than splitting).

== Prevalence ==
Duplicated ureter is the most common renal abnormality, occurring in approximately 1% of the population. It occurs in about 0.7% of healthy adults and in 2% to 4% of people with urinary tract issues.

Race
Duplicated ureter is more common in White Americans than in African Americans.
Sex
Duplicated ureter is more common in females. However, this may be due to the higher frequency of urinary tract infections in females, leading to a higher rate of diagnosis of duplicated ureter.

== Complications ==
A duplicated ureter increased the risk of:

- Hydronephrosis
- Urinary tract infection (UTI)
- Vesicoureteral reflux
- Incontinence

== See also ==
- Ectopic ureter
- Kidney development
- Ureterocele
