= Two layer hypothesis =

Archaeological theory

The two layer hypothesis, or two layer model, argues that Eastern and Southeastern Asia was initially occupied by hunter-gatherer groups considered to be Australo-Papuans before being replaced by Neolithic agriculturalists, who possessed East Asian cranial morphology. Cranial morphometrics and dental characteristics of human remains were cited as evidence for the hypothesis.

== Early hypotheses ==
The first fossilized skeletal remains and indication of early "Proto-Australian" Southeast Asian inhabitants surfaced in 1920 during an excavation by Dubois on the island of Java. Despite this, a formal connection to mainland Southeast Asia and the suggestion of an initial population of Australomelanesoids was not suggested until 1952 by Koenigswald in his response to Hooijer, who sharply criticized the attribution of 'big toothed' dental remains to early Australo-Melanesians. The immigration hypothesis proposed by Koenigswald was formally termed the 'Two Layer' model by Jacob Teuku. In 1967, Teuku analyzed the cranial and dental proportions of 152 adult skeletal samples recovered from prehistoric sites in Malaysia and Indonesia, the majority displaying robust jaws and teeth, prominent glabellae, and slender, elongated limbs. Teuku argued these characteristics correspond to the Australo-Melanesian population proposed by Koenigswald that predated the East Asian immigrants of the Neolithic; also suggesting the initial inhabitants were likely forced south of Southeast Asia's mainland by the second wave of migrants, due to resource competition or conflict.

== Modern debates and controversies ==
The existence of a distinct "Australo-Papuan race" has been discredited by modern day genetic research, which has found that groups historically classified as Australo-Papuan, such as Melanesians and Aboriginal Australians, are all part of a broader East Eurasian, or Eastern non-African, metapopulation, which also includes modern East Asians. This East Eurasian metapopulation was found to have originated in Mainland Southeast Asia at ~50,000 BC, following the settlement of the first anatomically modern humans in the region along the Southern Dispersal route, from which multiple populations have diverged. Within this East Eurasian cluster, the ancestors of current indigenous populations in Malaysia and Papuan-related groups first diverged around 50,000 to 33,000 years ago, while the ancestors of indigenous Malaysians and modern East Asians diverged around 40,000 to 15,000 years ago.

The main controversy concerning the two layer hypothesis is whether or not the evolutionary process truly involved the Australo-Melanesians. Archaeologists such as Matsumura suggest Southern Chinese people comprised the initial population of Southeast Asia, rather than Australo-Melanesians while researchers such as Turner argue that prehistoric Southeast Asians did not mix with either group, and instead Northeast Asians originated from Southeast Asians. Though the early prehistoric Vietnamese and Malaysians both resembled the Australo-Melanesian samples the most, the Mán Bạc people had a greater resemblance to the Đông Sơn samples dating back to the Iron Age. Analyzing cranial and dental remains, Matsumura concluded based on chronological differences that the Mán Bạc people were immigrants affiliated with peoples near the Yangtze River region in Southern China. Molecular anthropologists have used classical genetic markers and mtDNA to analyze the similarities between early Chinese and Southeast Asians. Such genetic markers suggest the genetic layout of Southern Chinese peoples is quite similar to that of Southeast Asians.

Other researchers completely reject the two layer hypothesis. Using dental evidence, Turner's Sundadont/Sinodont hypothesis suggests the "Sundadont" trait seen in present-day Southeast Asians is a result of long-standing continuity. Turner created a cluster analysis of MMD values in order to test existing hypotheses of origins, concluding that all Southeast Asians, Micronesians, Polynesians, and Jomonese form their own branch and descend from a common ancestor. The Australians and Melanesians, however, are scattered over the African and European branch along with a side branch of Tasmanians and Solomon Islanders. Howell analyzed crania of major racial branches worldwide, and linked Australian and Melanesian cranial morphology most closely with African cranials. Howell discovered, however, that the size and features of present-day Asian cranial morphology differed significantly from that of Australians, Melanesians, and Africans.

A 2021 study concluded that East Asian-related ancestry was widespread in Southeast Asia far earlier than previously suggested. Ancient remains of hunter-gatherers in Maritime Southeast Asia, such as one Holocene hunter-gatherer from South Sulawesi, had ancestry from both the Papuan-related and East Asian-related branches of the Eastern non-African lineage. The hunter-gatherer individual had approximately ~50% "Basal-East Asian" ancestry, and was positioned in between modern East Asians and Papuans of Oceania. The authors concluded that East Asian-related ancestry expanded from Mainland Southeast Asia into Maritime Southeast Asia much earlier than previously suggested, as early as 25,000 BC, long before the expansion of Austroasiatic and Austronesian groups.

Distinctive East Asian-related ancestry was recently found to have originated in Mainland Southeast Asia, emerging from the broader East Eurasian metapopulation, and expanded through multiple migration waves southwards and northwards respectively. Geneflow of East Eurasian ancestry into Maritime Southeast Asia and Oceania could be estimated to ~25,000 BC (possibly also earlier since 50,000 BC). The pre-Neolithic Papuan-related populations of Maritime Southeast Asia were largely replaced by the expansion of various East Asian-related populations, beginning about 25,000 BC from Mainland Southeast Asia. Southeast Asia was dominated by East Asian-related ancestry already in 15,000BC, predating the expansion of Austroasiatic and Austronesian peoples.

== See also ==
- Southeast Asian history
- Early human migrations
