= Patricia Jacobs =

British geneticist (1934–2026)

Patricia Jacobs OBE FRS FRSE FMedSci FRCPath FRCPE FRCOG FRSA
- Born: Patricia Ann Jacobs; 8 October 1934
- Died: 15 March 2026 (aged 91)
- Education: University of St Andrews
- Known for: Klinefelter syndrome XXY syndrome Trisomy X Philadelphia Chromosome
- Spouse: Newton Morton
- Awards: Mauro Baschirotto Award (1999); March of Dimes Prize in Developmental Biology (2011); William Allan Award (1981)
- Scientific career
- Workplaces: University of Southampton
- Thesis: Cytogenetic studies (1966)
- Website: southampton.ac.uk/medicine/about/staff/pj2f09.page

Patricia Ann Jacobs (8 October 1934 – 15 March 2026) was a Scottish geneticist and was Honorary Professor of Human Genetics, Co-director of Research, Wessex Regional Genetics Laboratory, within the University of Southampton.

== Early life and education ==
Jacobs was born on 8 October 1934 to Sadie (née Jones) and Cyril Jacobs. She attended the University of St Andrews, graduating in 1956 with a BSc with first class honours in zoology.

== Career and research ==
In 1959, five days after Jérôme Lejeune described the trisomy-21 in Down syndrome, basing himself off Marthe Gautier's work, Jacobs and John Strong described an additional X chromosome in male patients (the 47,XXY karyotype) also known as Klinefelter syndrome, as Harry Klinefelter had already diagnosed the symptoms in 1942. Despite her work being on XXY syndrome, the XYY syndrome is instead sometimes called Jacobs syndrome: After it had been incidentally discovered by Avery Sandberg in 1961, the syndrome was also found in a chromosome survey of 315 men at a hospital for developmentally disabled, made by Jacobs and hence considered the first little research on it. However, the experimental design had many flaws, including small sample sizes, biased sampling, and poor definition of the phenotype "aggression", resulted in the mischaracterization of XYY individuals as aggressive and violent criminals, which led the path for many biased studies on height-selected, institutionalised XYY individuals in the following decades.

== Personal life and death ==
In 1972, Jacobs married Newton Morton. She had two step-daughters and three step-sons. Jacobs died from a stroke on 15 March 2026, aged 91.

== Awards and honours ==
Jacobs received many awards in recognition of her work, including the 1999 Mauro Baschirotto Award of the European Society of Human Genetics and the 2011 March of Dimes Prize in Developmental Biology. Her services to genetics saw her named an OBE in 1999. Jacobs was elected as a Foreign Associate of the US National Academy of Sciences in 2010.

In 1981, she received the William Allan Award from the American Society of Human Genetics. In 1993, she was elected a Fellow of the Royal Society. She was the first recipient of the KS&A Patricia Jacobs Lifetime Achievement Award from the US charity Knowledge Support & Action. In February 2010, Jacobs was elected as a member of the United States National Academy of Sciences, the induction ceremony took place in April. In 2011, Jacobs received the March of Dimes Prize in Developmental Biology.
