= Elaine Fuchs =

American cell biologist

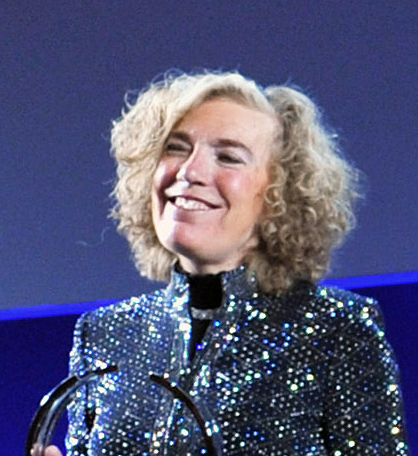
- Fuchs at the 2010 UNESCO-L’Oréal Prize for Women in Science Awards Ceremony at UNESCO Headquarters, Paris
- Education: University of Illinois, Princeton University
- Known for: Identifying the molecular mechanisms underlying skin disease
- Spouse: David Hansen
- Scientific career
- Fields: Cell biology Immunology
- Workplaces: The Rockefeller University
- Thesis: The biosynthesis and assembly of the peptidoglycan sacculus of Bacillus Megatorium
- Academic advisors: Howard Green, Janet Rowley, Susan Lindquist
- Website: lab.rockefeller.edu/fuchs/

Elaine V. Fuchs is an American cell biologist known for her work on the biology and molecular mechanisms of mammalian skin and skin diseases, who helped lead the modernization of dermatology. Fuchs pioneered reverse genetics approaches, which assess protein function first and then assess its role in development and disease. In particular, Fuchs researches skin stem cells and their production of hair and skin. She is an investigator at the Howard Hughes Medical Institute and the Rebecca C. Lancefield Professor of Mammalian Cell Biology and Development at The Rockefeller University.

== Early life and education ==
Fuchs grew up outside Chicago, in a family of scientists—her father, aunt, and sister were also scientists, and her family encouraged her to pursue higher education. She said those influences were especially important to her as a child. During an interview with Faiza Elmasry in 2010, Fuchs said, "I think like many of the children in our world, I got interested in science just from having a butterfly net and from having a few strainers and some boots and going down to the streams and creeks and being out in the fields." Even her mother, who was a homemaker, inspired her to pursue her interest in science at a time when not many women went into scientific fields. "She was a housewife but she took pride in everything that she did. She encouraged my sister and me in all different ways. My mom always said, 'You're a good cook, you'll make a fine scientist,' when I told her that I like science. So I think those kinds of little things maybe are more important that any of the bigger things."

Fuchs earned a B.S. in chemistry in 1972 from the University of Illinois, graduating with highest distinction in the Chemical Sciences. She began as one of only three women in an undergraduate physics class of 200. Fuchs was politically active during college, protesting the Vietnam War and applying to the Peace Corps with the intention of being posted in Chile. However, when she was instead assigned to Uganda, then under the dictatorship of Idi Amin, she elected to go directly to graduate school.

When applying to graduate school, Fuchs refused to take the Graduate Record Examination (GRE). During an interview in 2009, Fuchs stated, “…I felt that the Graduate Record Examination wasn’t testing my real knowledge, but rather how I could perform in a written exam.” Instead, she submitted a three-page explanation with her applications explaining why she would not be taking the GRE. Though she was accepted everywhere she applied, she admits that her defiant statement would not likely be looked upon the same way today. “I don’t think professors are as open-minded toward rebellious students as they were during the Vietnam War era.”

Fuchs earned her Ph.D. in biochemical sciences from Princeton University in 1977. Her doctoral dissertation was titled "The biosynthesis and assembly of the peptidoglycan sacculus of Bacillus Megatorium." Fuchs began her work on skin biology during her postdoctoral work with Howard Green at MIT. In Green's lab she studied the mechanisms underlying growth and differentiation in epidermal keratinocytes.

== Career and research ==
Fuchs accepted a faculty position at the University of Chicago in 1980 and was the first woman in the biochemistry department. Her first publications there reported the first cloning and sequencing of keratin cDNAs that characterized the two types of keratins. At the University of Chicago she was mentored and befriended by Janet Rowley and Susan Lindquist; they eventually all joined the reorganized Department of Molecular Genetics and Cell Biology, in which Fuchs was ultimately appointed the Amgen Professor of Molecular Genetics and Cell Biology. In 2002, Fuchs accepted a position at Rockefeller University, where she is currently the Rebecca C. Lancefield Professor of Mammalian Cell Biology and Development and an investigator at the Howard Hughes Medical Institute. Fuchs is known for her study of skin, identifying the molecular mechanisms underlying skin disease, developing the field of skin stem cells, and pioneering reverse genetics. Her research group uses laboratory mice and mammalian epithelial stem cell culture as model systems. Recently, she has been devoting her research to studies on the role stem cells play in the regeneration of tissue, as well as the competing demands of proliferation and differentiation in maintaining enough stem cells.

Fuchs currently sits on the board of the Damon Runyon Cancer Research Foundation. She was elected president of the American Society for Cell Biology in 2001. In 2009 Fuchs was awarded the United States’ highest honor for scientific contributions, the National Medal of Science, by President Barack Obama.

In 2015 she was awarded the American Society for Cell Biology's highest scientific honor, the E.B Wilson Medal. In 2020 she received the Canada Gairdner International Award.

=== Reverse genetics ===
Fuchs developed the reverse genetics approach when she began as an assistant professor at the University of Chicago. Reverse genetics seeks to understand the genetic basis of a disease by examining how specific genetic modifications (such as the use of transgenes) affect phenotype, as opposed to forward genetics, which searches for genetic explanations to a specific phenotype. Fuchs first applied the technique by engineering a gene that affected keratin function and disrupted the framework of cells. Inserting this mutant keratin into transgenic mice caused heavy epidermal blistering; analysis showed this blistering to be nearly identical to the dermatological disorder epidermolysis bullosa simplex. Subsequent collaboration with dermatologists to obtain skin samples from patients with the dermatological disorder revealed that a similar mutation in keratin genes indeed underlies the condition.

=== Stem cells in squamous cell carcinomas ===
Fuchs and her team have conducted research on how cancerous stem cells called squamous cell carcinomas (SCCs), some of the most common and dangerous cancers worldwide, interact with their microenvironments. By examining skin cancer in mice, she concluded that the speed at which stem cells will divide and how they divide is dependent on their niche. She examined the inhibitory signaling molecule TGF-β, which is found near the blood vessels of a tumor. Although the effects of TGF-β and how it restrains normal skin cell growth had been studied by researchers before Fuchs, she specifically looked at the intermediate steps of tumor progression by creating a TGF-β reporter system. She accomplished this by developing tumor cells that expressed a gene commonly found in skin cancer cells, HRasD12V. Her research demonstrated that cancerous stem cells lacking the TGF-β signal proliferate more quickly but are sensitive to antiproliferative drugs. In contrast, cancerous stem cells that received the TGF-β signal proliferated at a slower rate than those lacking the TGF-β signal but were resistant to antiproliferative drugs. She showed the ability of TGF-β to cause up-regulation of the glutathione pathway, which allowed the SCCs to counter the radical oxygen species often used in radiotherapy and chemotherapy. Fuchs determined that both the factors internal to the cell and the cell's external surrounding environment have an effect on the stem cells’ niche in both their ability to divide and how they divide.

== Personal life ==
Fuchs is married to a fellow academic, David Hansen, a faculty member at Teachers College, Columbia University. Her interests include travel, art, and photography.

=== Support for women in science ===
Throughout her career, Fuchs has made a point of supporting young female scientists. In an interview with Fiona Watt, an editor-in-chief for JCS, Fuchs details some of the challenges she faced as a woman pursuing a career in science and emphasizes the importance of role models: "Senior women who are recognized by their peers as being successful have a responsibility to help educate those scientists who haven't quite accepted this important message. And we have a responsibility to maintain the highest scientific and ethical standards and to serve as the best role models we can for the younger generation of outstanding scientists – both men and women – who are rising through the ranks. Leading by good example is still the best way to diffuse the now more subtle and less vocal, but nevertheless lingering, discrimination and dogmatism against women scientists within our scientific community.” Because there were few women in leadership roles doing laboratory research when Fuchs began her career, she often faced subtle discrimination. She related a story from her early days in Chicago when a technician from one of the other labs, seeing her setting up her new lab, asked if she was Dr. Fuchs’ new technician. She replied, “I am Dr. Fuchs!”

Fuchs said of the L’Oreal-UNESCO Award, "It's also a wonderful concept to reward a woman from each of the five major regional areas in which science is being conducted around the world, in a celebration of not only women in science, but also the importance of science in a world community."

== Awards and honors ==
=== Elected to ===
- American Academy of Arts and Sciences (1994)
- Institute of Medicine of the National Academy of Sciences (1994)
- National Academy of Sciences (1996)
- American Academy of Microbiology (1997)
- American Philosophical Society (2005)
- Fellow, American Association for the Advancement of Science (2008)
- Foreign Member, European Molecular Biology Organization (2010)
- Fellow, Academy of the American Association for Cancer Research (2013)
- Pontifical Academy of Sciences (2018)
- Foreign Member, The Royal Society (2019)

=== Awards ===
- Senior Women's Career Achievement Award (American Society of Cell Biology, 1997)
- Richard Lounsbery Award (National Academy of Sciences, 2001)
- Dickson Prize in Medicine (2004)
- National Medal of Science (2009)
- L'Oréal-UNESCO Awards for Women in Science (2010)
- Passano Award (2011)
- Albany Medical Center Prize (2011)
- March of Dimes Prize in Developmental Biology (2012)
- American Skin Association Lifetime Achievement Award (2013)
- Pasarow Award (2013)
- Pezcoller Foundation-AACR International Award for Extraordinary Achievement in Cancer Research (2014)
- E.B. Wilson Medal, ASCB (2015)
- International Society for Stem Cell Research Innovation Award (2017)
- Canada Gairdner International Award (2020)
- Benjamin Franklin Medal in Life Science (2023)
- American Federation for Aging Research Glenn Foundation for Medical Research Discovery Award (2025)

Preceded by Richard Hynes	ASCB Presidents; 2001	Succeeded by Gary Borisy
