= Harry Klinefelter =

American rheumatologist and endocrinologist (1912–1990)

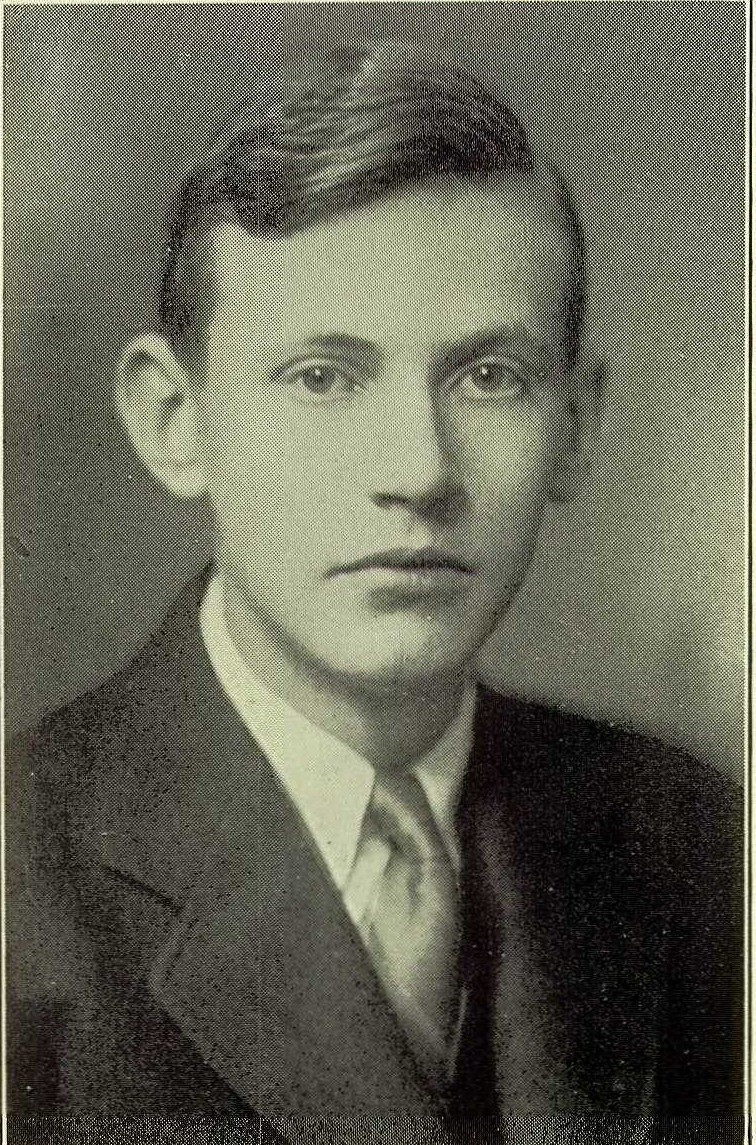
- Klinefelter at Episcopal High School in 1930
- Born: Harry Fitch Klinefelter Jr. March 20, 1912; Baltimore, Maryland, U.S.
- Died: February 20, 1990 (aged 77)
- Education: University of Virginia; Johns Hopkins School of Medicine
- Known for: Klinefelter syndrome
- Scientific career
- Fields: Rheumatology; endocrinology
- Workplaces: Johns Hopkins Hospital; Massachusetts General Hospital

Harry Fitch Klinefelter Jr. (/ˈklaɪnfɛltər/; March 20, 1912 – February 20, 1990) was an American rheumatologist and endocrinologist. He is best known for being the first to identify Klinefelter syndrome, which is named after him.

== Biography ==
Harry Fitch Klinefelter Jr. was born on March 20, 1912, in Baltimore, Maryland. He attended Episcopal High School in Alexandria, Virginia, before studying at the University of Virginia and attaining his medical degree from Johns Hopkins School of Medicine. After his graduation in 1937, he continued his training in internal medicine at the Johns Hopkins Hospital.

Klinefelter worked at the Massachusetts General Hospital in Boston from 1941 to 1942. In 1942, under the supervision of Fuller Albright, he described a group of nine men with "gynecomastia, aspermatogenesis without aleydigism, and increased excretion of follicle-stimulating hormone." This was the first description of what would later be called Klinefelter syndrome.

Initially, he suspected this to be endocrine disorder and postulated the presence of a second testicular hormone, but in 1959, Patricia A. Jacobs and John Anderson Strong demonstrated that a male patient with the phenotype of Klinefelter syndrome had an additional X chromosome (47 XXY). Klinefelter later confirmed that the cause was chromosomal rather than hormonal.

Klinefelter served in the Armed Forces from 1943 to 1946 and then returned to Johns Hopkins, where he remained during his professional life. In 1966, he was named associate professor. He retired at age 76, and died on February 20, 1990, aged 77.
