= Richard White (biologist) =

American physician-scientist and cancer biologist

Richard M. White
- Education: Rensselaer Polytechnic Institute (BS); Albany Medical College (MD, PhD)
- Known for: Casper zebrafish; melanoma biology; zebrafish models of cancer
- Awards: American Society for Clinical Investigation, elected member (2020); Academia Europaea, elected member (2026)
- Scientific career
- Fields: Cancer biology, genetics, developmental biology
- Workplaces: University of Oxford; Ludwig Institute for Cancer Research; Memorial Sloan Kettering Cancer Center; Weill Cornell Medicine
- Doctoral advisor: Cathy A. Davison
- Website: White Laboratory Page

Richard Mark White is an American physician-scientist and cancer biologist whose research has advanced the use of zebrafish as models for cancer biology. He is best known for co-developing the transparent casper zebrafish, a research model that enables live imaging of tumors and stem-cell transplantation, and for studies of melanoma biology. He is Professor of Genetics at the University of Oxford and a Member of the Ludwig Institute for Cancer Research.

== Early life and education ==
White grew up in Brooklyn, New York. He received a Bachelor of Science degree from Rensselaer Polytechnic Institute in 1991 through a six-year combined B.S.–M.D. program with Albany Medical College. He earned M.D. and Ph.D. degrees from Albany Medical College in 1998, after which he completed residency training in internal medicine at Yale New Haven Hospital. In 2004, he joined the laboratory of Leonard Zon at Harvard Medical School as a postdoctoral fellow, where he began using zebrafish as a model organism to study cancer.

== Career ==
Following his postdoctoral training, White joined the faculty of Memorial Sloan Kettering Cancer Center and Weill Cornell Medical College, where he established a laboratory investigating the developmental origins of cancer using zebrafish models.

In 2022, White joined the University of Oxford as Professor of Genetics and became a Member at the Oxford Branch of the Ludwig Institute for Cancer Research.

He is currently vice-president and president elect of the Society for Melanoma Research. His presidency will begin in 2027. He is a former president of The Zebrafish Disease Models Society.

== Research ==
White's research has focused on developing and applying zebrafish models in cancer biology. His laboratory studies how developmental programs are co-opted during tumor initiation and metastasis, with a particular emphasis on melanoma.

One of his main contributions was the development of the transparent adult zebrafish strain casper, which permits direct visualization of cells and tissues in living adult animals. The casper model enables high-resolution imaging of tumor growth, invasion, metastasis, and angiogenesis in living animals, providing a level of detail that is difficult to achieve in murine and other experimental models. Contemporary coverage described growing interest in the model among zebrafish researchers, with White receiving about 50 requests from scientists, from all over the world, seeking to use the fish. By the following year, Nature Medicine reported that casper was being used by more than 100 laboratories around the world for research including cancer biology and developmental biology. Other contemporary news outlets reported White's use of the model to visualize melanoma cells and study their movement and metastasis in living fish. Since its publication, the paper describing casper has been cited more than 1,700 times in the scientific literature, reflecting the model's broad impact on zebrafish research.

White's laboratory has investigated how the tumor microenvironment influences melanoma initiation and progression. In 2025, his group showed that mechanical confinement can trigger melanoma cells to switch from a proliferative to an invasive, drug-resistant state through changes in chromatin organization involving HMGB2. The findings received coverage in scientific and drug-discovery publications, which highlighted the role of the tumor microenvironment in cancer-cell behavior and treatment resistance. His group has also investigated interactions between melanoma cells and adipocytes during metastasis.

== Awards and honors ==
White has received multiple awards recognizing his contributions to cancer biology, including:

- Pershing Square Sohn Cancer Research Alliance Award (2017)
- Elected member, American Society for Clinical Investigation (2020)
- Outstanding Research Award, Society for Melanoma Research (2023)
- Academy of Medical Sciences Professorship (2025)
- Elected member, Academia Europaea (2026)
