= Marisa Bartolomei =

American cell biologist

- Education: University of Maryland, College Park; Johns Hopkins University
- Scientific career
- Workplaces: Perelman School of Medicine at the University of Pennsylvania; Princeton University
- Thesis: Genetic analysis of the Mouse RNA polymerase II largest subunit (1987)

Marisa Bartolomei is an American cell biologist, the Perelman Professor of Cell and Developmental Biology and Co-Director of the Epigenetics Institute at the Perelman School of Medicine at the University of Pennsylvania. Her research considers epigenetic processes including genomic imprinting. She was elected to the National Academy of Sciences in 2021.

== Early life and education ==
Bartolomei was an undergraduate student at the University of Maryland, College Park, where she majored in biochemistry. She was the first member of her family who graduated from college. Her doctoral research considered mouse RNA polymerase. After earning her doctorate she moved to the Johns Hopkins School of Medicine, where she was part of the cellular and molecular biology programme.

Bartolomei was a postdoctoral fellow in laboratory of Shirley M. Tilghman at Princeton University. Here she identified H19, one of the first imprinted genes. She found that this gene was part of an imprinted gene cluster that included the Insulin-like growth factor 2 (Igf2) gene. Bartolomei identified that imprinted genes are regulated by methylated imprinting control regions (ICR). The mouse models developed by Tilghman and Bartolomei helped to identify that it was genetic mutations on H19 that cause Silver–Russell syndrome. Microdeletions on the H19 ICR have been associated with Beckwith–Wiedemann syndrome.

As a postdoc Bartolomei showed that DNA methylation was essential in conferring the parental identity of imprinted genes. Specifically, loss of the maintenance methyltransferase DNMT1 can disrupt imprinted gene expression in both the placenta and the embryo.

== Research and career ==
In 1993 Bartolomei joined the faculty at the Perelman School of Medicine at the University of Pennsylvania. She dedicated her career to understand genomic imprinting, an inheritance process that results in unequal expression of the maternal and paternal alleles of genes. Amongst these genes, Bartolomei has continued to study H19. She found that when the gene was activated in the blastocyst mouse models demonstrated maternal-specific expression.

These mouse models allowed Bartolomei to identify that assisted reproductive technologies (including in-vitro culture, embryo transfer, in vitro fertilisation and hormonal hyperstimulation) can contribute to errors in epigenetic gene regulation. She has investigated the role of the transcription factor CTCF. She found that in the absence of CTCF, H19 becomes hypermethylated and embryos die early in development. She went on to show that CTCF was crucial in early development and very involved with gene activity.

Her research has considered X-inactivation in mice; the process by which female mice silence oneX chromosome to achieve the same X-linked expression as male mice.

== Awards and honours ==
- 2006 Society for Women’s Health Research Medtronics Prize
- 2011 University of Pennsylvania Jane Glick Graduate School Teaching Award
- 2014 Elected Fellow of the American Association for the Advancement of Science
- 2017 The Genetics Society Medal
- 2021 Elected Fellow of the National Academy of Sciences
- 2025 March of Dimes Prize in Developmental Biology

== Personal life ==
Bartolomei is married with two daughters.

== Select publications ==
- Bartolomei, Marisa S.; S. Zemel; Tilghman, Shirley M. (1991). "Parental imprinting of the mouse H19 gene". Nature. 351 (6322): 153–155. doi:10.1038/351153a0. PMID 1709450. Wikidata Q22122365.
- H Cho; James Mu; J K Kim; et al. (2001). "Insulin resistance and a diabetes mellitus-like syndrome in mice lacking the protein kinase Akt2 (PKB beta)". Science. 292 (5522): 1728–1731. doi:10.1126/science.292.5522.1728. PMID 11387480. Wikidata Q29615537.
- Cortellino, Salvatore; Xu, Jinfei; Sannai, Mara; et al. (2011). "Thymine DNA glycosylase is essential for active DNA demethylation by linked deamination-base excision repair". Cell. 146 (1): 67–79. doi:10.1016/j.cell.2011.06.020. PMC 3230223. PMID 21722948. Wikidata Q24309357.
