= March of Dimes Prize in Developmental Biology =

- Awarded for: Honors outstanding scientists who profoundly advance the science that underlies our understanding of pregnancy, parturition, and prenatal development.
- Sponsored by: March of Dimes
- Country: United States
- Reward: up to $150,000
- First award: 1996
- Currently held by: Leonard Zon
- Website: Prize Website

The March of Dimes Prize in Developmental Biology is awarded once a year by the March of Dimes. The Prize honors outstanding scientists who profoundly advance the science that underlies our understanding of pregnancy, parturition, and prenatal development." Created as a tribute to Dr. Jonas Salk shortly before his death in 1995, the Prize has been awarded annually since 1996. It is now named in recognition of Dr. Richard B. Johnston, Jr. MD, March of Dimes Medical Director when the Prize was initiated. Dr. Johnston, Jr. is a member of the National Academy of Medicine.

== Laureates ==
Source: March of Dimes

- 2026 Leonard Zon
- 2025 Dennis Lo
- 2024 Marisa Bartolomei
- 2022–23 Patrica Hunt
- 2021 Alan W. Flake
- 2020 Susan Fisher
- 2019 Myriam Hemberger
- 2018 Allan C. Spradling
- 2017 Charles David Allis
- 2016 Victor R. Ambros and Gary B. Ruvkun
- 2015 Rudolf Jaenisch
- 2014 Huda Y. Zoghbi
- 2013 Eric N. Olson
- 2012 Elaine Fuchs and Howard Green
- 2011 Patricia Ann Jacobs and David C. Page
- 2010 Shinya Yamanaka
- 2009 Kevin P. Campbell and Louis M. Kunkel
- 2008 Philip A. Beachy and Clifford Tabin
- 2007 Anne McLaren and Janet Rossant
- 2006 Alexander Varshavsky
- 2005 Mario R. Capecchi and Oliver Smithies
- 2004 Mary F. Lyon
- 2003 Pierre Chambon and Ronald M. Evans
- 2002 Seymour Benzer and Sydney Brenner
- 2001 Corey S. Goodman and Thomas M. Jessell
- 2000 H. Robert Horvitz
- 1999 Martin J. Evans and Richard L. Gardner
- 1998 Davor Solter
- 1997 Walter J. Gehring and David S. Hogness
- 1996 Beatrice Mintz and Ralph L. Brinster

== See also ==
- List of biology awards
- List of medicine awards
