= Genetic epidemiology =

Study of the role of genetic factors in determining health and disease

Genetic epidemiology is the study of the role of genetic factors in determining health and disease in families and in populations, and the interplay of such genetic factors with environmental factors. Genetic epidemiology seeks to derive a statistical and quantitative analysis of how genetics work in large groups.

== Definition ==
The use of the term Genetic epidemiology emerged in the mid-1980s as a new scientific field.

In formal language, genetic epidemiology was defined by Newton Morton, one of the pioneers of the field, as "a science which deals with the etiology, distribution, and control of disease in groups of relatives and with inherited causes of disease in populations". It is closely allied to both molecular epidemiology and statistical genetics, but these overlapping fields each have distinct emphases, societies and journals.

One definition of the field closely follows that of behavior genetics, defining genetic epidemiology as "the scientific discipline that deals with the analysis of the familial distribution of traits, with a view to understanding any possible genetic basis", and that "seeks to understand both the genetic and environmental factors and how they interact to produce various diseases and traits in humans". The British Medical Journal adopts a similar definition, "Genetic epidemiology is the study of the aetiology, distribution, and control of disease in groups of relatives and of inherited causes of disease in populations."

== History ==
As early as the 4th century BC, Hippocrates suggested in his essay "On Airs, Waters, and Places" that factors such as behavior and environment may play a role in disease. Epidemiology entered a more systematic phase with the work of John Graunt, who in 1662 tried to quantify mortality in London using a statistical approach, tabulating various factors he thought played a role in mortality rates. John Snow is considered to be the father of epidemiology, and was the first to use statistics to discover and target the cause of disease, specifically of cholera outbreaks in 1854 in London. He investigated the cases of cholera and plotted them onto a map identifying the most likely cause of cholera, which was shown to be contaminated water wells.

=== Modern history ===
Modern genetics began on the foundation of Gregor Mendel's work. Once this became widely known, it spurred a revolution in studies of hereditary throughout the animal kingdom; with studies showing genetic transmission and control over characteristics and traits. As gene variation was shown to affect disease, work began on quantifying factors affecting disease, accelerating in the 20th century. The period since the second world war saw the greatest advancement of the field, with scientists such as Newton Morton helping form the field of genetic epidemiology as it is known today, with the application of modern genetics to the statistical study of disease, as well as the establishment of large-scale epidemiological studies such as the Framingham Heart Study.

In the 1960s and 1970s, epidemiology played a part in strategies for the worldwide eradication of naturally occurring smallpox.

== Fundamentals ==
Traditionally, the study of the role of genetics in disease progresses through the following study designs, each answering a slightly different question:

- Familial aggregation studies: Is there a genetic component to the disease, and what are the relative contributions of genes and environment?
- Segregation studies: What is the pattern of inheritance of the disease (e.g. dominant or recessive)?
- Linkage studies: On which part of which chromosome is the disease gene located?
- Association studies: Which allele of which gene is associated with the disease?

This traditional approach has proved highly successful in identifying monogenic disorders and locating the genes responsible.

More recently, the scope of genetic epidemiology has expanded to include common diseases for which many genes each make a smaller contribution (polygenic, multifactorial or multigenic disorders). This has developed rapidly in the first decade of the 21st century following completion of the Human Genome Project, as advances in genotyping technology and associated reductions in cost has made it feasible to conduct large-scale genome-wide association studies that genotype many thousands of single nucleotide polymorphisms in thousands of individuals. These have led to the discovery of many genetic polymorphisms that influence the risk of developing many common diseases. The genetic epidemiology can also be skewed by the presence of evolutionary pressures that induce negative selection during molecular evolution. This negative selection can be determined by tracking the skewness of the distribution of mutations with putatively severe effects as compared to the distribution of mutations with putatively mild or absent effect.

== Approaches ==
Genetic epidemiological research follows 3 discrete steps, as outlined by M.Tevfik Dorak:

1. Establishing that there is a genetic component to the disorder.
2. Establishing the relative size of that genetic effect in relation to other sources of variation in disease risk (environmental effects such as intrauterine environment, physical and chemical effects as well as behavioral and social aspects).
3. Identifying the gene(s) responsible for the genetic component.

Modern genetic epidemiology also uses Mendelian randomization, in which genetic variants associated with modifiable exposures can be used as instrumental variables to test whether observed exposure-disease associations are consistent with causality. These research methodologies can be assessed through either family or population studies.

== See also ==
- Epigenetics
- Genetic disorder
- Mendelian randomization
- Molecular epidemiology
- Mutation
- Population genetics
- Hardy–Weinberg principle
- Population groups in biomedicine
