= Newton Morton =

American population geneticist

Newton E. Morton
- Born: December 21, 1929; Camden, New Jersey, United States
- Died: February 7, 2018 (aged 88)
- Education: Hopkins High School, University of Hawaiʻi; University of Wisconsin–Madison
- Known for: Founder of the field of Genetic epidemiology
- Spouse: Patricia Jacobs (2nd wife)
- Children: 5 (with 1st wife)
- Awards: William Allan Award (1962)
- Scientific career
- Fields: Genetic epidemiology
- Institutions: Atomic Bomb Casualty Commission; Memorial Sloan Kettering Cancer Center; University of Southampton

Newton Ennis Morton (21 December 1929 – 7 February 2018) was an American population geneticist and one of the founders of the field of genetic epidemiology.

== Early life and education ==
Morton was born in Camden, New Jersey. When he was three months old, his family moved to New Haven, Connecticut. His interest in science started at an early age, when he would collect butterflies. Morton attended Hopkins School, later transferring to Swarthmore College for two years. He lost enthusiasm for entomology, so instead he decided to pursue a career in genetics after being inspired by Dobzhansky's book, Genetics and the Origin of Species.

After marrying a woman from Hawaii, Morton decided to attend the University of Hawaiʻi to earn a BA in Zoology, finishing his degree in 1951. He completed a thesis on Drosophila at the University of Wisconsin–Madison, but he was more interested in the work of James F. Crow and Sewall Wright. Morton then worked with Crow on the Atomic Bomb Casualty Commission in Japan during 1952–1953. This inspired him to pursue a career in human genetics. He earned a PhD in genetics from the University of Wisconsin in 1955.

== Academic career ==
Morton's career began in Japan, working on the Atomic Bomb Casualty Commission. He researched the effect of exposure to atomic bombs, including the effect on first-generation offspring. He published papers on the linkage of blood groups with diseases, nonrandomness of consanguineous marriage and the inheritance of human birth weight. In 1955–1956, Morton was made a National Cancer Institute Postdoctoral Fellow at the University of Wisconsin. He worked at the university, first as an assistant professor in 1956, later becoming an associate professor in 1960 for two years. At the university, Morton conducted a study of over 180,000 births.

In 1962, Morton won the William Allan Award for his contribution in the field of human genetics. In that same year, he set up the department of genetics. After realizing that the department was no longer tenable due to administrative problems, he instead decided to set up the Population Genetics Laboratory at Hawaii in 1964. He was appointed director of the facility and stayed there for 21 years. He left Hawaii in 1985 and spent two years at the Memorial Sloan Kettering Cancer Center in New York City as the head of the Department of Epidemiology and Biostatistics. In 1988, Morton acquired a position as professor and director of the Cancer Research Campaign Research Group in Genetic Epidemiology at the University of Southampton. In 1999, a book on the recent advances of genetic epidemiology was published in honor of his 70th birthday. He was a Senior Professional Fellow in Human Genetics from 1995 until 2011. Morton retired from the University of Southampton in April 2011 due to age and Alzheimer's-related health problems.

== Personal life ==
Morton was married to his second wife, Professor Patricia Jacobs, for over 40 years. Morton has five children and seven grandchildren with his first wife.

He died on 7 February 2018 at the age of 88.
