= Sarny urban hromada =

Urban hromada in Rivne Oblast, Ukraine

Sarny urban hromada Сарненська міська громада
- Hromada
- Seal

- Location within Rivne Oblast Location within Ukraine
- Coordinates: 51°20′14″N 26°36′21″E
- Country: Ukraine
- Oblast: Rivne Oblast
- Raion: Rivne Raion

Area
  - Total: 815.4 km^{2} (314.8 sq mi)

Population (2022)
  - Total: 65,725

Sarny urban territorial hromada (Ukrainian: Сарненська міська територіальна громада, romanized: Sarnenska miska terytorialna hromada) is a hromada of Ukraine, located in the country's western Rivne Oblast. Its capital is the city of Sarny. The area of the hromada is 815.4 square kilometres (314.8 mi^{2}), and it has a population of 65,725 (2022 estimate)

== Settlements ==
The hromada consists of one city (Sarny), as well as 35 villages:

- Biliatychi
- Buteiky
- Velyke Verbche
- Velykhiv
- Vyrka
- Vysove
- Hlushytske
- Hlushytsia
- Horodets
- Dovhe
- Dubky
- Ivanivka
- Kopyshche
- Korost
- Kostiantynivka
- Krychylsk
- Liubykhovychi
- Liukhcha
- Male Verbche
- Marianivka
- Maslopushcha
- Obirky
- Odrynky
- Orlivka
- Poliana
- Remchytsi
- Svaryni
- Strilsk
- Triskyni
- Tutovychi
- Uberezh
- Uhly
- Tseptsevychi
- Chemerne
- Yarynivka

== History ==
On 15 January 2023, the Sarny urban hromada was one of nine hromadas in Rivne Oblast to receive a bus and humanitarian aid from German bus company Meso and More. According to Vitaliy Koval, Governor of Rivne Oblast, the bus was given to local educational institutions for transportation of students and teachers.

== See also ==
- List of hromadas of Ukraine
