= Sarny =

City in Rivne Oblast, Ukraine

Sarny Сарни
- City
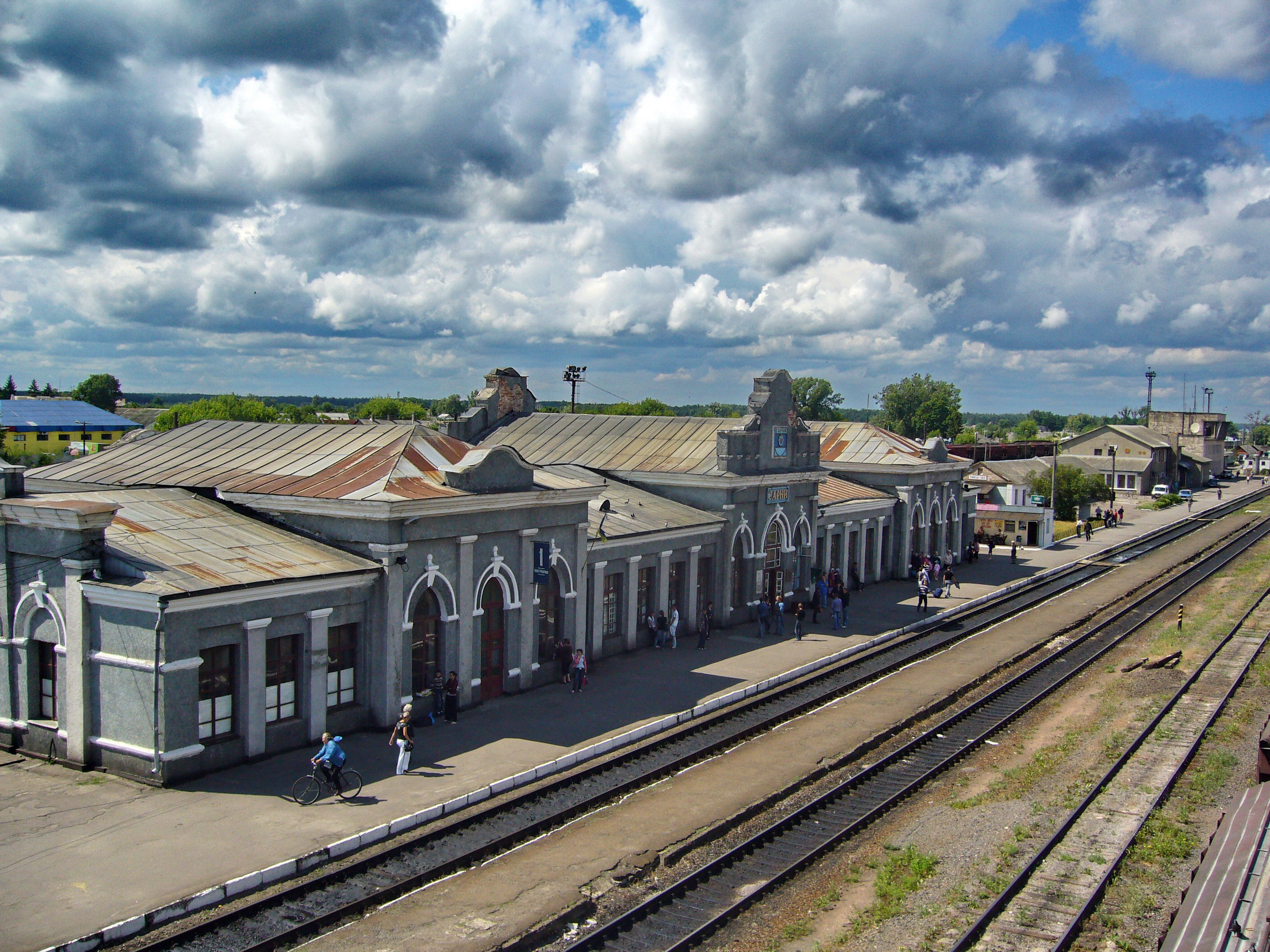
- Railway station

- Flag Coat of arms

- Location of Sarny Sarny (Ukraine)
- Coordinates: 51°20′14″N 26°36′21″E
- Country: Ukraine
- Oblast: Rivne Oblast
- Raion: Sarny Raion
- Hromada: Sarny urban hromada

Population (2022)
  - Total: 28,626

Sarny (Ukrainian: Сарни, IPA: [ˈsɑrnɪ]; Polish: Sarny) is a small city in Rivne Oblast of western Ukraine. It is the administrative center of Sarny Raion within the oblast and is a major railway node on the Sluch River. Population: 28,626 (2022 estimate).

== Etymology ==
The city is named after the roe deer and can be literally translated as "deer" (plural); the name was adopted due to the abundance of them in the forests in the area.

== History ==
=== History to 1939 ===
Sarny at its outset was a small village on the Polissia-Volyn border, located between forests and swamps. Its name is derived from the word "serna", referring to the wild goats that roamed freely in the area at the time.

Sarny was a part of the Kingdom of Halych-Volhynia. It was later annexed by the Grand Duchy of Lithuania, followed by the Polish–Lithuanian Commonwealth. From 1795 it was considered a part of the Russian Empire, as part of the Volhynian Governorate. It later became part of the estate of the Dzerzhinsky family.

The railway reached Sarny in 1885, which was the same year that Sarny was formally constituted as a city. It became an important junction between railways of Rivne-Luninets and Kovel-Korosten, particularly after the construction of a railroad station in 1901, tied to the rail line linking Kyiv to Kovel, which was known as "the southwest line" and which now joined "the Polesia line". Concurrently, a large locomotive depot was constructed and Sarny became a centre of railroad activity, resulting in a need for construction of new housing for railway employees.

Sarny was one of a series of towns and cities designated as railway station locations at key area boundaries. These municipalities were distinguished by the extent to which they were associated with manufacturing and markets, including being points for the concentration of agricultural produce for export. Lumber manufacturing also became an important and growing industry in Sarny, given that it was surrounded by forests.

Sarny became a focal point of the settlement of Russian Jews, commencing as of 1903, following the pogroms at Kishinev, when Sarny was under Russian rule. Russian Interior Minister Vyacheslav von Plehve published a list of villages in which Jews were given "permission" to live, one of which was Sarny. General Dzerzhinsky travelled to St. Petersburg and obtained a permit to constitute Sarny as a "permitted town" for Jewish residents. By royal decree, every 100 villages were entitled to build a town in which Jews were permitted to live. Once he had obtained the permit, General Dzerzhinsky commenced to lease his land to Jewish residents, who were only permitted to lease, rather than to buy his land.

In 1912, the first bank was established in Sarny — the Sarny Mutual Credit & Loan — in response to the financing requirements of forest products and textile merchants.

Prior to 1914, there was one private school and no public schools in Sarny. The private school was a Russian school with four grades, owned by management of the railroad and primarily for the benefit of the children of railroad employees. During this same period, there were no medical facilities in Sarny, and only one physician in the city.

Sarny became a focal point for a large number of orphans fleeing the Petlura pogroms in Ukraine between 1918 and 1920. The city was annexed to Poland, following the Polish-Soviet War of 1919–1921. Due to the city's proximity to the Russian border, it became a Polish military centre following the Polish-Soviet War. In addition, prior to the outbreak of World War II, an airfield was constructed beside Sarny.

The city's economic zenith occurred after World War I, particularly during the period of Polish rule between 1921 and 1939, involving close economic and social relationships with the neighbouring city of Rivne, which had been the previous provincial seat, prior to Polish rule.

In 1921, the city became part of the Second Polish Republic. Sarny also developed close economic ties with the metropolitan centres of Poland, such as Warsaw and Łódź. In Poland, it was the seat of a Sarny county (powiat), firstly in Polesie Voivodeship, then, since 1930 – in Wołyń Voivodeship. During this period, four hotels were constructed around the railway station, serving the needs of lumber merchants, in particular. In addition, Sarny had a ten-person police force, a functioning courthouse with permanent judge and secretary, a post office and, what was particularly important for the time, a government store selling hard liquor.

As of 1921, approximately 50% of the town was composed of persons primarily of Polish, Ukrainian and Russian backgrounds, who were also Jewish, amounting to approximately 2,800 individuals. The city was divided by the rail line, with Jewish residents predominantly on one side, and predominantly non-Jewish residents on the other: the "Polesia side". Parallel education systems developed for Jewish and non-Jewish residents, since there was a 10% quota limiting Jewish students from attending public secondary schools.

Despite Sarny being a county seat in Poland and under Polish legislative rule, the dominant social influence at the time was Ukrainian, including Ukrainian nationalist sentiments.

In the 1930s, Polish military authorities constructed a number of fortifications in the area of Sarny, known as the Sarny Fortified Area (Sarnenski Rejon Umocniony), along the Sluch river.

=== 1939–1944 ===
In September 1939, Sarny was occupied by Russian forces following the Ribbentrop-Molotov Pact and the Soviet invasion of Poland. The Russian attack on September 17, 1939 met with Polish resistance. Sarny became a concentration point for units under the command of Brigadier General Wilhelm Orlik-Rückemann. The "Sarny" regiment, commanded by Lieutenant Colonel Nikodem Sulik, provided cover. The regiment stemmed the attack of the Soviet 60th Rifle Division, based on the strong fortifications of the Sarny Fortified Area. A crew of a single bunker, under the command of Second Lieutenant Jan Bołbot, lasted out in its position until September 19, delaying the advance of Soviet units.

300 Polish policemen were killed by Soviet soldiers in 1939, just after Soviets attacked Poland.

The city was captured by Nazi Germany on July 8, 1941, following the repudiation by Germany of the Ribbentrop-Molotov Pact and the German attack on Russia on June 22, 1941.

At the time, Sarny had a Jewish population of approximately 5,000 persons. While Russian troops retreated, Ukrainian nationalists did not retreat with the Russian forces, but instead saw an opportunity to support the independence of Ukraine through alliances with the Nazis.

Subsequent to the German occupation, the Nazis commandeered Jews of Sarny as forced labour. In addition, the Jewish population was forced to turn over most of its assets to the Nazis, with orders largely enforced by Ukrainian police.

In April 1942, a ghetto was established in Sarny, into which were forced the Jews from Sarny and the surrounding towns.

In August 1942, Sarny was the scene of what came to be known as the Sarny Massacre. Over two days, on August 27–28, 1942, between 14,000 and 18,000 people, mostly Jews from Sarny and surrounding towns, including an estimated 100 Roma, were systematically executed in the ravines on the outskirts of the town, where pits had been prepared. The executions were carried out by German troops and Ukrainian Auxiliary Police, assisted by some 200 members of Organization Todt. A memorial book of the history of the Jewish community in Sarny was published in 1961, containing first person accounts by community survivors.

During the Volhynian Genocide, commencing in 1943, Sarny was a shelter for ethnic Polish population of Volhynian countryside, massacred by the Ukrainian Insurgent Army. In May 1943, German authorities created a Polish police unit, which defended the town from the Ukrainians. In 1944, most Poles were transported either to the General Government, or to the Third Reich as OST-Arbeiters.

=== 1944-present ===
Sarny was reclaimed by Soviet forces on January 11, 1944. Since 1944, it has been a part of Ukrainian SSR and later independent Ukraine, as of 1991.

In 1972, a Russian tank, the SU-76i, adapted from the Panzer, was discovered in the river around Sarny. It was determined that it was a tank that had attempted to cross the river on January 11, 1944, in support of the advance of the Russian 143rd Rifle Division on Sarny. The tank broke through the ice and sank with its crew. Upon its discovery in 1972, the tank was recovered, renovated and put on display at the then Lenin Prospekt Memorial in Sarny.

Contemporary Sarny has predominantly an agriculture-based economy. Through to the 1990s, it was considered to be an industrial and transportation centre, with its principal industries being machine building and metalworking, building materials, woodworking and flax processing. The city and its economy were affected by the 1986 Chernobyl nuclear disaster, despite its distance from it. There is interest in renewed investment in the sawmill industry in Sarny.

==== Russian invasion of Ukraine ====
In the evening of March 16, 2022, during the Russian invasion of Ukraine, the city was hit for the first time by a missile strike by the Russian Armed Forces. According to the head of the Rivne Regional State Administration Vitaliy Koval, the blow was inflicted on one of the military infrastructure facilities in Sarny. He also said that there were no victims.

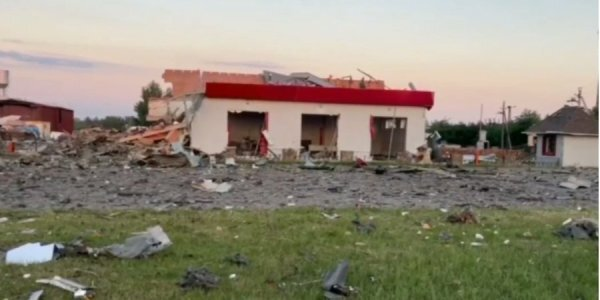
Automobile repair shop hit by a missile attack on June 25, 2022

In the evening of June 25, 2022, the city was hit for the second time by a missile strike by the Russian Armed Forces. According to the head of the Rivne Regional State Administration Vitaliy Koval, the attack was carried out on civilian infrastructure, at least 4 people were killed and seven others were injured.

On the evening of August 28, 2022, powerful explosions rang out in Sarny during an air raid alert, the city was hit by a rocket from the Russian Armed Forces for the third time. According to the head of the Rivne Regional State Administration, V. Koval, a total of four missile strikes on the military infrastructure facility were recorded. There were no casualties. About 30 residential buildings and the premises of the central district hospital were damaged by the shock wave.

== Demography ==
As of January 1, 2019, the population was 29,205 people. According to the 2001 census, 28,257 people lived in Sarny. Links to population censuses and metric books with birth, marriage, and death records up to 1939 are available in open access on the “Sarny in Archives” website.

Population dynamics
1816	1834	1850	1858	1912	1939	1959	1970	1979	1989	1992	2001	2006	2011	2019
931	927	1114	1145	4967	13 400	10 174	15 409	19 137	29 269	30 012	28 144	28 151	28 604	29 205

== Geography ==
=== Climate ===
Climate data for Sarny (1991–2020)
Month	Jan	Feb	Mar	Apr	May	Jun	Jul	Aug	Sep	Oct	Nov	Dec	Year
Mean daily maximum °C (°F)	−0.4 (31.3)	1.3 (34.3)	6.8 (44.2)	15.0 (59.0)	20.8 (69.4)	24.1 (75.4)	26.0 (78.8)	25.5 (77.9)	19.6 (67.3)	12.9 (55.2)	5.8 (42.4)	0.9 (33.6)	13.2 (55.8)
Daily mean °C (°F)	−3.4 (25.9)	−2.4 (27.7)	1.9 (35.4)	9.0 (48.2)	14.4 (57.9)	17.8 (64.0)	19.5 (67.1)	18.8 (65.8)	13.7 (56.7)	8.1 (46.6)	2.7 (36.9)	−1.8 (28.8)	8.2 (46.8)
Mean daily minimum °C (°F)	−5.8 (21.6)	−5.2 (22.6)	−1.8 (28.8)	3.5 (38.3)	8.5 (47.3)	12.1 (53.8)	14.0 (57.2)	12.9 (55.2)	8.6 (47.5)	3.9 (39.0)	0.1 (32.2)	−4.1 (24.6)	3.9 (39.0)
Average precipitation mm (inches)	33 (1.3)	32 (1.3)	34 (1.3)	36 (1.4)	61 (2.4)	72 (2.8)	107 (4.2)	64 (2.5)	52 (2.0)	40 (1.6)	42 (1.7)	40 (1.6)	613 (24.1)
Average precipitation days (≥ 1.0 mm)	8.5	9.2	8.7	7.5	9.3	9.3	9.8	6.6	7.5	7.6	8.4	9.2	101.6
Average relative humidity (%)	85.4	82.5	76.5	69.2	67.8	69.8	71.6	71.0	77.0	81.5	87.0	87.8	77.3
Source: NOAA

== Notable people ==
- Czeslaw Bobrowski (1904–1996), Polish economist
- Vitaliy Bunechko (born 1973), Ukrainian civil servant and politician
- Oleksandr Chernov (born 2002), Ukrainian footballer
- Avery A. Sandberg (1921–2016), cancer researcher, born in Sarny

== Twin towns – sister cities ==
Sarny is twinned with:

- Długołęka, Poland
- Nowy Dwór Gdański, Poland

== Gallery ==
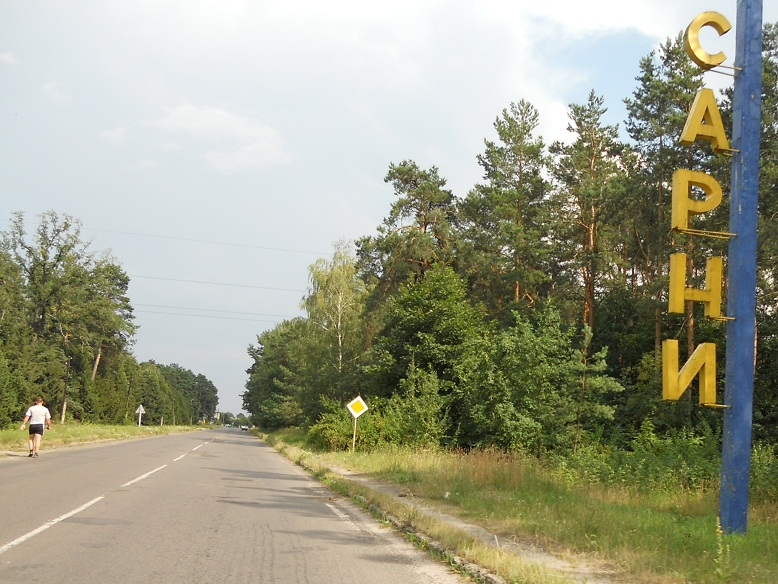
Road near Sarny

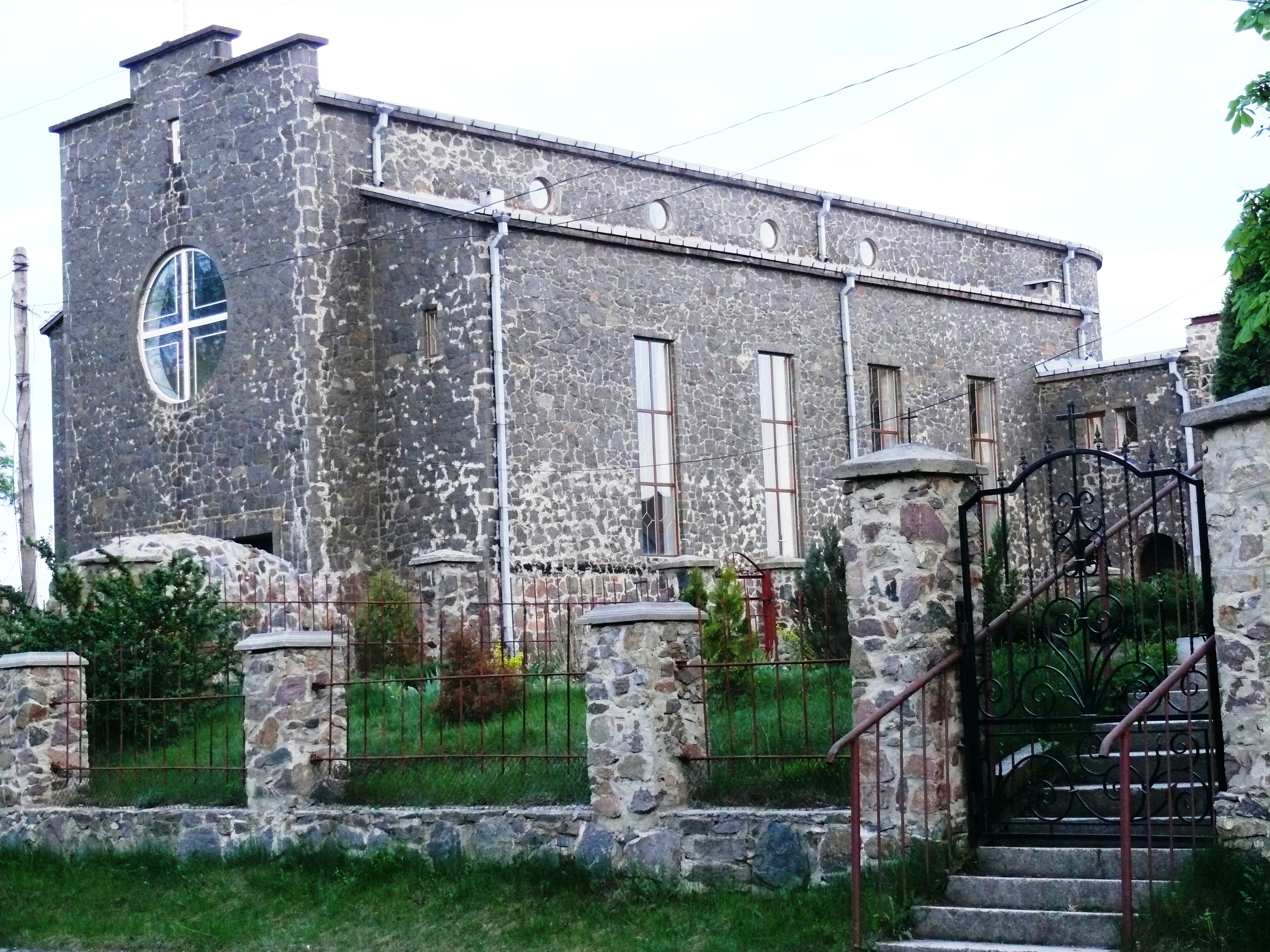
Sarny catholic church
