= Ronald Girdwood =

Scottish physician

Professor Ronald Girdwood CBE FRSE FRCP FRCPE FRCPI FRCPath

Professor of Therapeutics and Clinical Pharmacology, University of Edinburgh
- In office 1962–1982

Personal details
- Born: Ronald Haxton Girdwood; 19 March 1917
- Died: 25 April 2006 (aged 89)
- Occupation: Physician

Ronald Haxton Girdwood (19 March 1917 – 25 April 2006) was a Scottish physician, Professor of Therapeutics at the University of Edinburgh and a President of the Royal College of Physicians of Edinburgh. He undertook research into megaloblastic anaemia and was awarded a gold medal for his MD thesis. He was Dean of the Faculty of Medicine at the University of Edinburgh from 1975 to 1982 and oversaw the expansion of the medical school. He was a member of the Committee on Safety of Medicines. He was elected a member of the Harveian Society of Edinburgh in 1953 and was elected a member of the Aesculapian Club in 1965. He was elected a Fellow of the Royal Society of Edinburgh in 1978 and awarded a CBE in 1985.

Academic offices
Preceded by John Anderson Strong	President of the Royal College of Physicians of Edinburgh; 1982–1985	Succeeded by Michael Francis Oliver
