= Leonard I. Zon =

Medical researcher

- Education: Muhlenberg College (BS); Jefferson Medical College (MD)
- Known for: Development of zebrafish models for the study of hematopoiesis and cancer
- Awards: Elected to the National Academy of Medicine (2005); Elected to the American Academy of Arts and Sciences (2008); Elected to the National Academy of Sciences (2022)
- Scientific career
- Fields: Developmental biology,oncology
- Workplaces: Harvard Medical School
- Website: https://www.zonlab.org/

Leonard Ira Zon is the Grousbeck Professor of Pediatric Medicine at Harvard Medical School, Investigator at Howard Hughes Medical Institute, and Director of the Stem Cell Program, Children’s Hospital Boston.

He received a B.S. degree in chemistry and natural sciences from Muhlenberg College and an M.D. degree from Jefferson Medical College. He subsequently did an internal medicine residency at New England Deaconess Hospital and a fellowship in medical oncology at Dana–Farber Cancer Institute. His postdoctoral research was in the laboratory of Stuart Orkin.

== Research ==
Zon is recognized for his work in the fields of stem cell biology and cancer genetics.

Zon's laboratory uses the zebrafish as a model system for understanding vertebrate blood development. Zebrafish blood formation is similar to that of humans, and several mutants have disorders resembling human disease. It is possible to evaluate in the zebrafish genetic pathways important for vertebrate hematopoiesis. Zon also uses the zebrafish to study cancer.

He is founder and former president of the International Society for Stem Cell Research and chair of the Executive Committee of the Harvard Stem Cell Institute (HSCI). He was the 2004–2005 President of the American Society for Clinical Investigation.

He has been a Howard Hughes Medical Institute Investigator since 1993.

== Awards and honors ==
- 2005 – Elected to the Institute of Medicine of the National Academies
- 2008 – Elected to the American Academy of Arts and Sciences
- 2010 – E. Donnall Thomas Prize, American Society of Hematology
- 2013 – Donald Metcalf Award, International Society for Experimental Hematology
- 2016 – Alfred G. Knudson Award, National Cancer Institute
- 2016 – ISSCR Tobias Award Lecture, International Society for Stem Cell Research
- 2017 – AACR-Irving Weinstein Foundation Distinguished Lecture Award, American Association for Cancer Research
- 2019 – Mentor Award for Basic Science, American Society of Hematology
- 2022 – Elected to the National Academy of Sciences
- 2022 – Christiane Nüsslein-Volhard Award, European Zebrafish Society
- 2026 – Richard B. Johnston Jr., MD Prize in Developmental Biology, March of Dimes
