= Howard Green (physician) =

- Born: September 10, 1925; Toronto
- Died: October 31, 2015 (aged 90); Boston, Massachusetts
- Education: University of Toronto
- Known for: stem-cell research, skin culture
- Spouse: Rosine Kauffmann
- Awards: March of Dimes Prize in Developmental Biology
- Scientific career
- Workplaces: New York University School of Medicine, Massachusetts Institute of Technology, Harvard Medical School

Howard Green (September 10, 1925 – October 31, 2015) was an American scientist, and George Higginson Professor of Cell Biology at Harvard Medical School.

He was the first to culture human cells in a laboratory setting for therapeutic use. He is one of the founding fathers of stem-cell research and regenerative medicine. One famous case involving Doctor Green concerned Jamie and Glenn Selby, two children from Wyoming who were burned over 95% of their bodies. Green cut small patches of undamaged skin from the boys, grew them in a lab and was able to harvest skin grafts to cover their burns.

== Education and personal life ==
Howard Green was born in 1925 in Toronto, Ontario. He graduated from University of Toronto medical school. He served in the United States Army. He taught at New York University School of Medicine, Massachusetts Institute of Technology from 1970 to 1980, and Harvard Medical School from 1980 to 1993.

Green married Rosine Kauffmann Green née Kauffmann in 1954.

He died on October 31, 2015, outside Boston, Massachusetts.

On November 23, 2016, Shriner's Hospitals for Children in Boston announced the opening of the Howard Green Center for Children's Skin Health and Research, funded by a $3 million gift from his wife, Mrs. Rosine Kauffmann Green.

== Academic positions held ==
=== Harvard Medical School ===
George Higginson Professor of Cell Biology

Chairman - Department of Cellular and Molecular Physiology 1980-1993

Head of Green Lab

=== Massachusetts Institute of Technology ===
Professor of Cell Biology

=== New York University School of Medicine ===
Faculty member of the Department of Pathology

== Awards and honors ==
Award	Year
March of Dimes Prize in Developmental Biology	2012
Warren Alpert Foundation Prize	2010
Blaise Pascal Award in Medical and Life Sciences of the European Academy of Sciences	2007
Legion of Honour	2001
Lewis S. Rosenstiel Award for Distinguished Work in Basic Medical Research	1979
Selman A. Waksman Award in Microbiology For his fundamental contributions to the biology of cultured animal cells.	1978
Member, National Academy of Sciences	1978

== Publications ==
=== Book ===
Therapy with Cultured Cells - book published 2010

=== Selected academic articles ===
Date	Title	Journal
May 1, 1963	The Growth of Mouse Embryo Cells In Culture and Their Development into Established Lines	The Journal of Cell Biology
November 1975	Serial Cultivation of Strains of Human Epidermal Keratinocytes: The Formation of Keratinzing Colonies from Single Cells	Cell
November 1979	Growth of cultured human epidermal cells into multiple epithelia suitable for grafting	Proceedings of the National Academy of Sciences of the United States of America
January 10, 1981	Grafting of Burns with Cultured Epithelium Prepared from Autologous Epidermal Cells	The Lancet
