= Avery Sandberg =

American geneticist

- Born: 29 January 1921; Sarny, Ukraine (then Poland)
- Died: 6 July 2016 (aged 95); Scottsdale, Arizona
- Education: Wayne State University
- Known for: The Chromosomes in Human Cancer and Leukemia
- Scientific career
- Fields: Cancer, hematology
- Institutions: University of Utah, University of Arizona College of Medicine

Avery A. Sandberg (29 January 1921 – 6 July 2016) was one of the founding fathers of cancer research and made key contributions to hematology.

== Early life ==
Avery A. Sandberg was born on January 29, 1921, in Sarny, Ukraine (then Poland) and died at the age of 95 on July 6, 2016, in Scottsdale, Arizona. Avery Sandberg was the eldest of three brothers - Avery, Arthur, and Hershel to their parents, Rivka Shapiro Sandberg and Jacob Sandberg. The Sandberg family lived in a wooden house on Tolstoho Street without central heating or electricity. Once a week, pails of water from a well two blocks away would be carried home for the family to take a bath. As Jewish people, they were not allowed to live near or go to school with the Polish. Sarny was a Jewish community with its own Hebrew schools and synagogue. However, the community often experienced anti-Semitism both verbally and physically by passing soldiers or Polish people. According to Hershel in an interview with the Holocaust Memorial Center, Avery got beaten up after attending a Polish school for a single day. Instead, Avery went to a Hebrew school in Rovno where he was taught English.

Jacob, an avid reader of German, Russian, Polish, and Jewish newspapers, predicted what would become World War II in the coming years. He applied for United States passports for the family in 1932, but did not receive them until 1936 when his brother-in-law, Levi Shapiro, who lived in the U.S. delivered them. In 1938, one year before World War II started, the Sandberg's boarded the ship Lancastria where they sailed from Sarny to Danzig and then Liverpool. They lived in camps for six weeks in Liverpool, until they sailed twelve more days to Ireland and finally the United States. They arrived in New York in March 1938, moved in with Avery's grandparents, Simcha and Anna Shapiro, on Elmhurst Street in Detroit, but ultimately settled into their own home in Fullerton, Detroit. Both Avery and Arthur started school, while Hershel attended an intermediate school to catch up on his English. Jacob worked in a butcher shop where the boys would flick chickens every Wednesday for their father to sell Thursdays and Fridays. In the 1940s, Avery and Arthur went to Wayne State University. Avery graduated in 1946 where he went on to study hematology and research cancer genetics after his uncle and father both died of brain tumors.

== Career and legacy ==
Most of Sandberg's hematology and cancer research started in the laboratories at the University of Utah where he became a member and scholar of the American Cancer Society. In 1958, Sandberg worked as a professor of medicine and was appointed the head of the Department of Genetics and Endocrinology at the Roswell Park Cancer Institute where he furthered his research. Sandberg and colleagues in Buffalo, New York published the first report of a man with a 47,XYY karyotype in 1961. He was also the editor and chief of one of the first scientific journals on cancer cytogenetics in 1979 called "Cancer Genetics and Cytogenetics." Shortly after, he wrote his first book called The Chromosomes in Human Cancer and Leukemia. He taught at the University of Buffalo School of Medicine in New York before moving to Arizona with his wife, Maryn Sandberg, and four daughters, Diana, Jan, Ruth, and Nina, in 1986.

In Arizona, Sandberg continued his teaching career at the University of Arizona College of Medicine as a professor of medicine and pathology. As of 1999, Sandberg was a consultant with the DNA Diagnostics Laboratory at St. Joseph's Hospital and Medical Center in Phoenix with no interest in retirement. He spent his free time collecting art and lecturing at community centers about the history of the Jews. After his wife Maryn died in June 2013, Avery Sandberg followed three years later.

== Selected books ==
- The Y Chromosome, Part B: Clinical Aspects of Y Chromosome Abnormalities (1985) ISBN 0-471-84767-4
- The chromosomes in human cancer and leukemia (1990) ISBN 0-444-01491-8
