= Ephrin A4 =

Protein found in humans

EFNA4

Identifiers
- Aliases: EFNA4, EFL4, EPLG4, LERK4, ephrin A4, LERK-4
- External IDs: OMIM: 601380; MGI: 106643; GeneCards: EFNA4

Gene location (Human)
Chr.	Chromosome 1 (human)
Band	1q21.3	Start	155,063,737 bp
Band	1q21.3	End	155,069,553 bp

Gene location (Mouse)
Chr.	Chromosome 3 (mouse)
Band	3 F1|3 39.07 cM	Start	89,240,697 bp
Band	3 F1|3 39.07 cM	End	89,245,335 bp
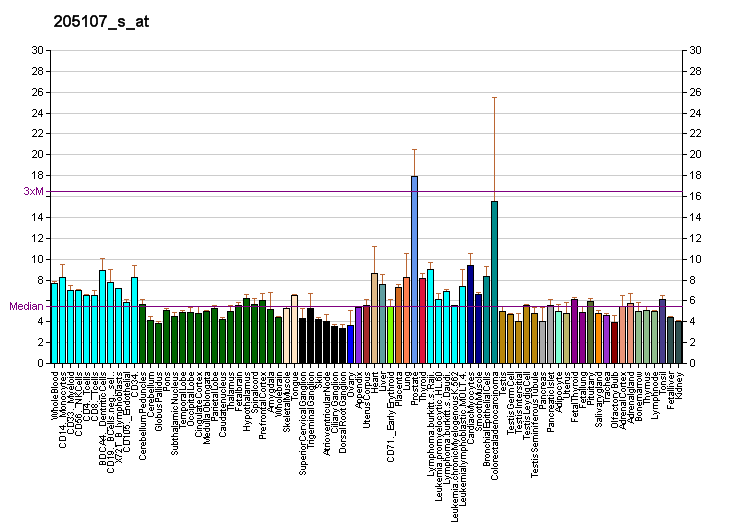
RNA expression pattern
Bgee	Human / Mouse (ortholog); Top expressed in: gonad; skin of leg; skin of abdomen; mucosa of transverse colon; right adrenal cortex; rectum; left adrenal gland; minor salivary glands; left adrenal cortex; gingival epithelium / Top expressed in: maxillary prominence; mandibular prominence; lip; otic vesicle; ventricular zone; superior surface of tongue; genital tubercle; embryo; hand; saccule; More reference expression data
BioGPS	More reference expression data
Gene ontology
Molecular function	transmembrane-ephrin receptor activity; protein binding; ephrin receptor binding
Cellular component	anchored component of membrane; plasma membrane; integral component of plasma membrane; membrane; extracellular region; intrinsic component of plasma membrane
Biological process	cell-cell signaling; ephrin receptor signaling pathway; axon guidance; osteoclast differentiation; bone remodeling
Sources:Amigo / QuickGO
Orthologs
Databases	NCBI: entry; OMA: entry
Species	Human	Mouse
Entrez	1945	13639
Ensembl	ENSG00000243364	ENSMUSG00000028040
UniProt	P52798	O08542
RefSeq (mRNA)	NM_182690; NM_005227; NM_182689	NM_007910
RefSeq (protein)	NP_005218; NP_872631; NP_872632	NP_031936
Location (UCSC)	Chr 1: 155.06 – 155.07 Mb	Chr 3: 89.24 – 89.25 Mb
PubMed search
- Wikidata
View/Edit Human	View/Edit Mouse

Ephrin A4 is a protein that in humans is encoded by the EFNA4 gene.

This gene encodes a member of the ephrin (EPH) family. The ephrins and EPH-related receptors comprise the largest subfamily of receptor protein-tyrosine kinases and have been implicated in mediating developmental events, especially in the nervous system and in erythropoiesis. Based on their structures and sequence relationships, ephrins are divided into the ephrin-A (EFNA) class, which are anchored to the membrane by a glycosylphosphatidylinositol linkage, and the ephrin-B (EFNB) class, which are transmembrane proteins. This gene encodes an EFNA class ephrin. Three transcript variants that encode distinct proteins have been identified.
