= John Anderson Strong =

Scottish physician/internist and academic

Professor John Anderson Strong CBE FRSE FRCP FRCPE

Professor of Medicine, University of Edinburgh
- In office 1966–1980

Personal details
- Born: 18 February 1915 Ireland
- Died: 15 December 2012 (aged 97)
- Occupation: Physician

John Anderson Strong (18 February 1915 – 15 December 2012) was a Scottish physician/internist and academic, who served as Professor of Medicine at the University of Edinburgh and the President of the Royal College of Physicians of Edinburgh.

Born in Ireland, he was educated at Monkton Combe School in Bath, and then studied medicine at Trinity College, Dublin. Shortly after graduating, he entered the Royal Army Medical Corps at the outbreak of the Second World War, and served in the UK and in the Far East throughout the war. He was awarded the MBE in 1942 for his military work, and mentioned in despatches in 1945 for his service in Burma; after the war, he was given the honorary rank of Lieutenant-Colonel in the RAMC.

He then began to teach medicine, and was appointed to the post of Senior Lecturer at the University of Edinburgh in 1949, along with the position of honorary consulting physician at the Western General Hospital. In 1959 he was appointed as an honorary physician in the Medical Research Council Clinical and Population Cytogenetics Unit, and in 1966 was appointed to a Chair of Medicine at the University of Edinburgh. He retired from the latter two posts in 1980, at the age of 65, and was appointed Professor Emeritus the following year.

In 1979 he was appointed President of the Royal College of Physicians of Edinburgh, holding the position until 1982. Other medical work in his later career included sitting as a member of the Medicines Commission from 1976 to 1983, and as the chair of the Scottish Health Education Co-Ordinating Committee from 1986 to 1988.

He was a Fellow of the Royal College of Physicians, the Royal College of Physicians of Edinburgh, and the Royal Society of Edinburgh, as well as an honorary fellow of the American College of Physicians (1980), the Royal College of Physicians of Ireland (1980), the College of Physicians of Philadelphia, Trinity College, Dublin, the College of Physicians of South Africa, the Royal College of General Practitioners, and a member of the Academy of Medicine, Singapore. In 1952 he was elected a member of the Harveian Society of Edinburgh. He was appointed CBE in 1978.

He married Moira Heaney in 1939, with whom he had one son and two daughters: she died in 1997.

He was cited by professor Bryan Sykes in Adam's Curse: A Future Without Men

Academic offices
Preceded by Ronald Foote Robertson	President of the Royal College of Physicians of Edinburgh; 1979–1982	Succeeded by Ronald Haxton Girdwood
